= Protected areas of North Carolina =

North Carolina protected areas

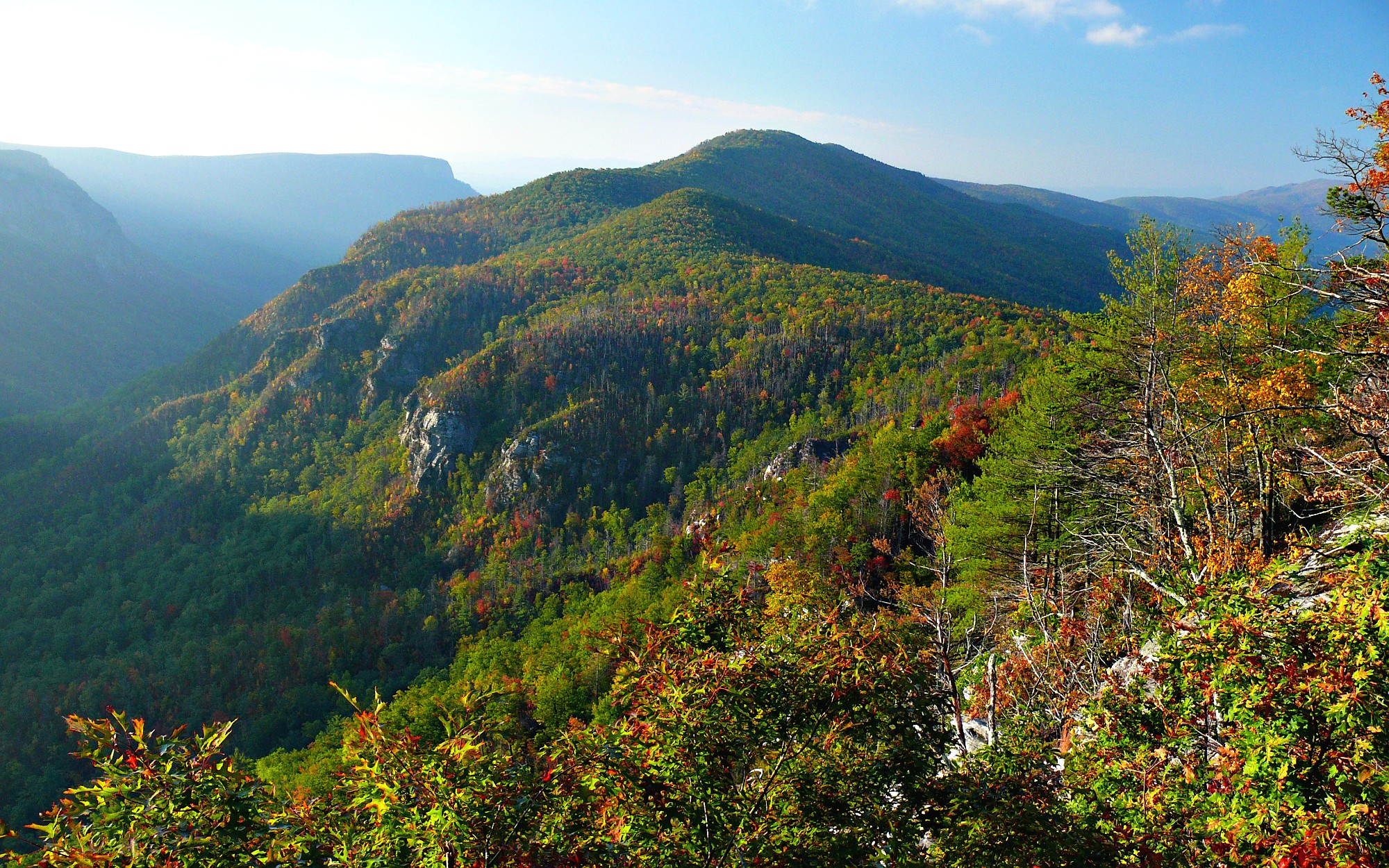
Linville Gorge Wilderness

The protected areas of North Carolina cover roughly 3.8 million acres, making up 11% of the total land in the state. 86.5% of this protected land is publicly owned and is managed by different federal and state level authorities and receive varying levels of protection. Some areas are managed as wilderness while others are operated with acceptable commercial exploitation. The remainder of the land is privately owned, but willingly entered into conservation easement management agreements, or are owned by various nonprofit conservation groups such as the National Audubon Society and The Nature Conservancy. North Carolina contains 1 National Park, and various other federally owned protected land including 2 National Seashores, 5 National Forests, 12 Wildlife Refuges, and the southern half of the Blue Ridge Parkway. North Carolina has an extensive state park system of 42 open units, 35 of which are state parks, 4 that are recreation areas, and 3 staffed state natural areas, along with other designated units managed by the North Carolina Department of Natural and Cultural Resources.

== Federal-level protection agencies ==
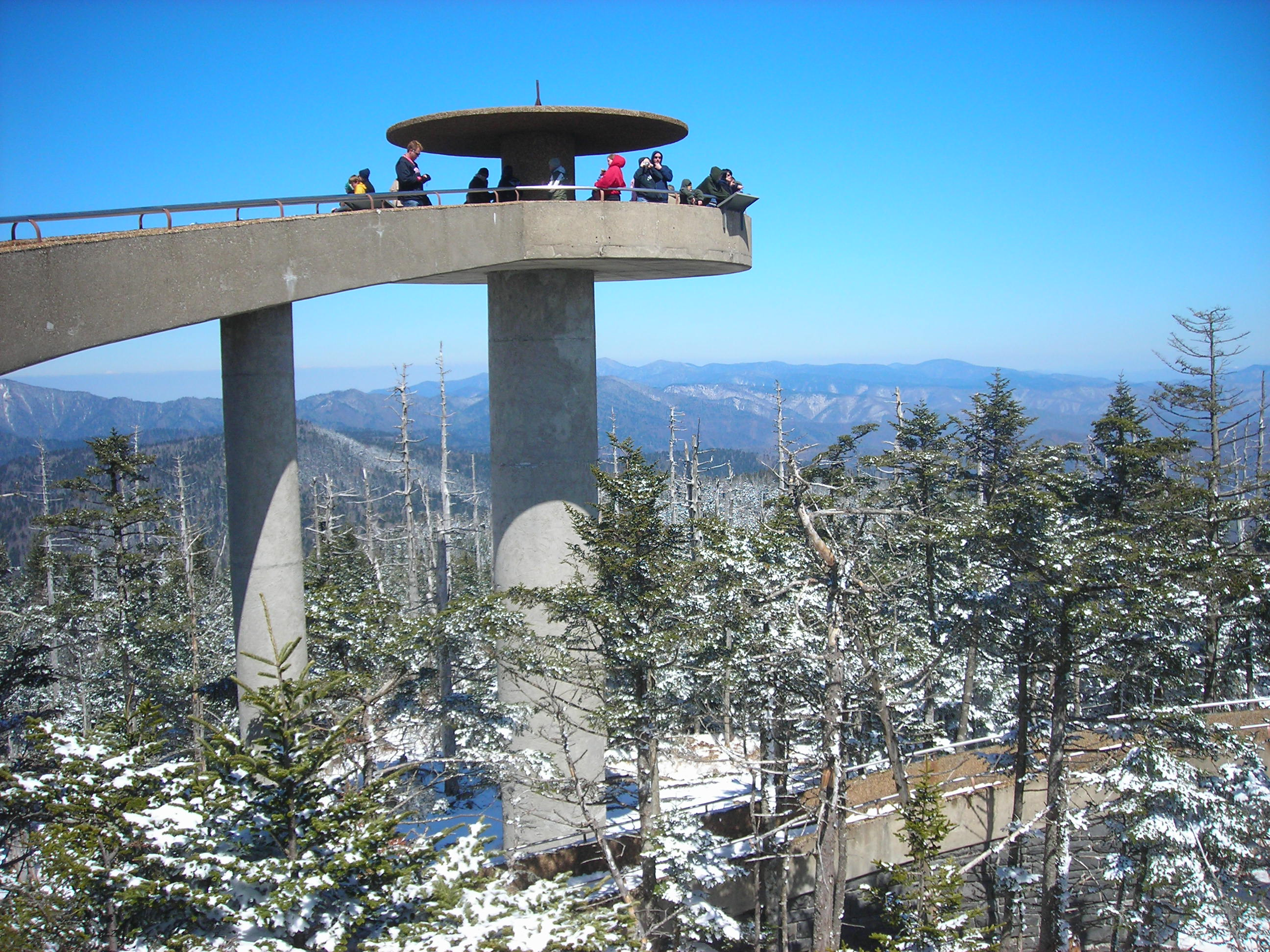
Kuwohi; the tallest mountain in Great Smoky Mountains National Park

North Carolina's federally protected areas are managed by agencies within the United States Department of the Interior. The agencies which govern nationally protected places in North Carolina are the National Park Service; the U.S. Forest Service; the Bureau of Land Management; and the United States Fish and Wildlife Service.

=== National Parks ===
- Great Smoky Mountains National Park

=== National Historic Sites ===
- Carl Sandburg Home National Historic Site
- Fort Raleigh National Historic Site

=== National Memorials ===
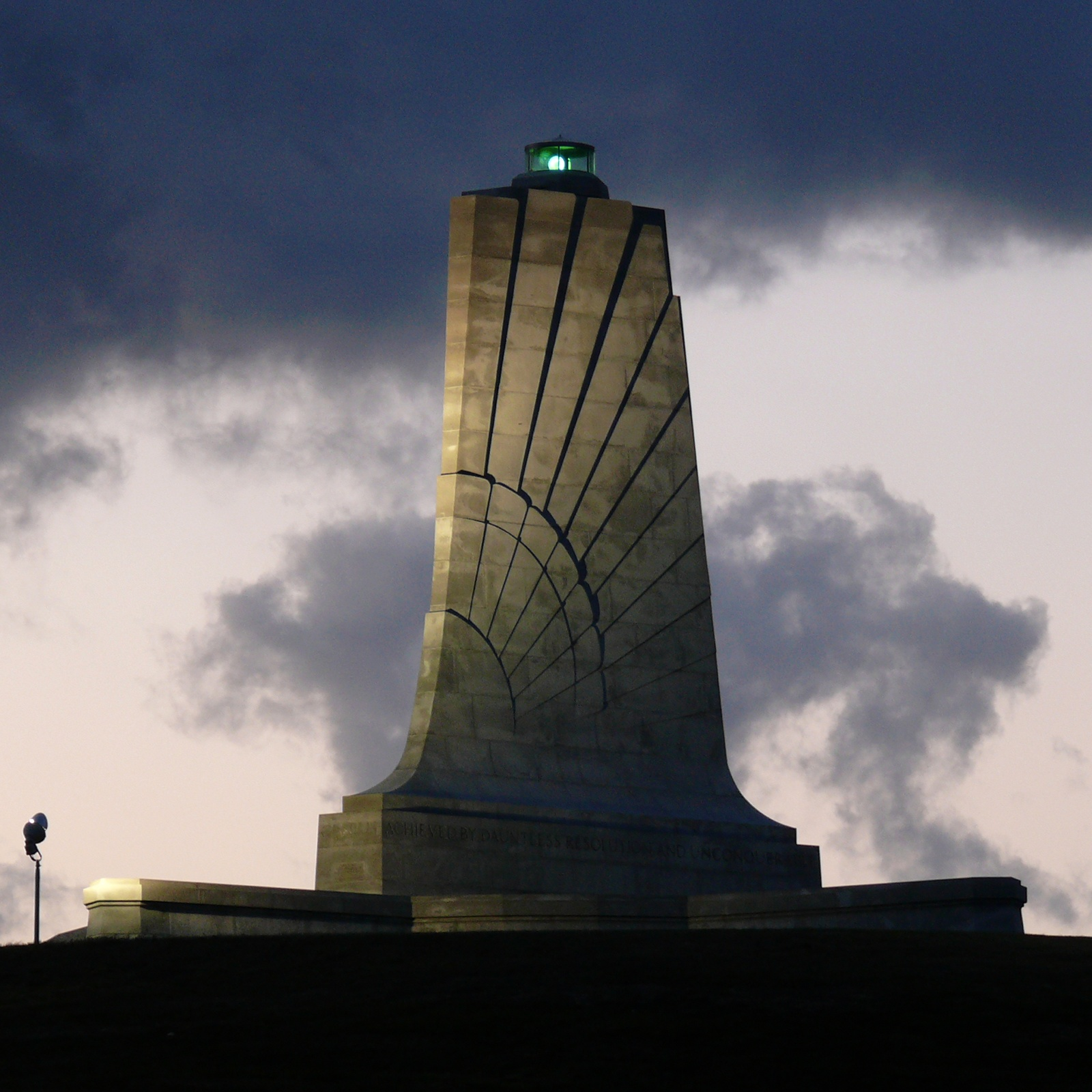
Wright Brothers National Memorial

- Wright Brothers National Memorial

=== National Military Parks ===
- Guilford Courthouse National Military Park

=== National Battlefields ===
- Moores Creek National Battlefield

=== National Parkways ===
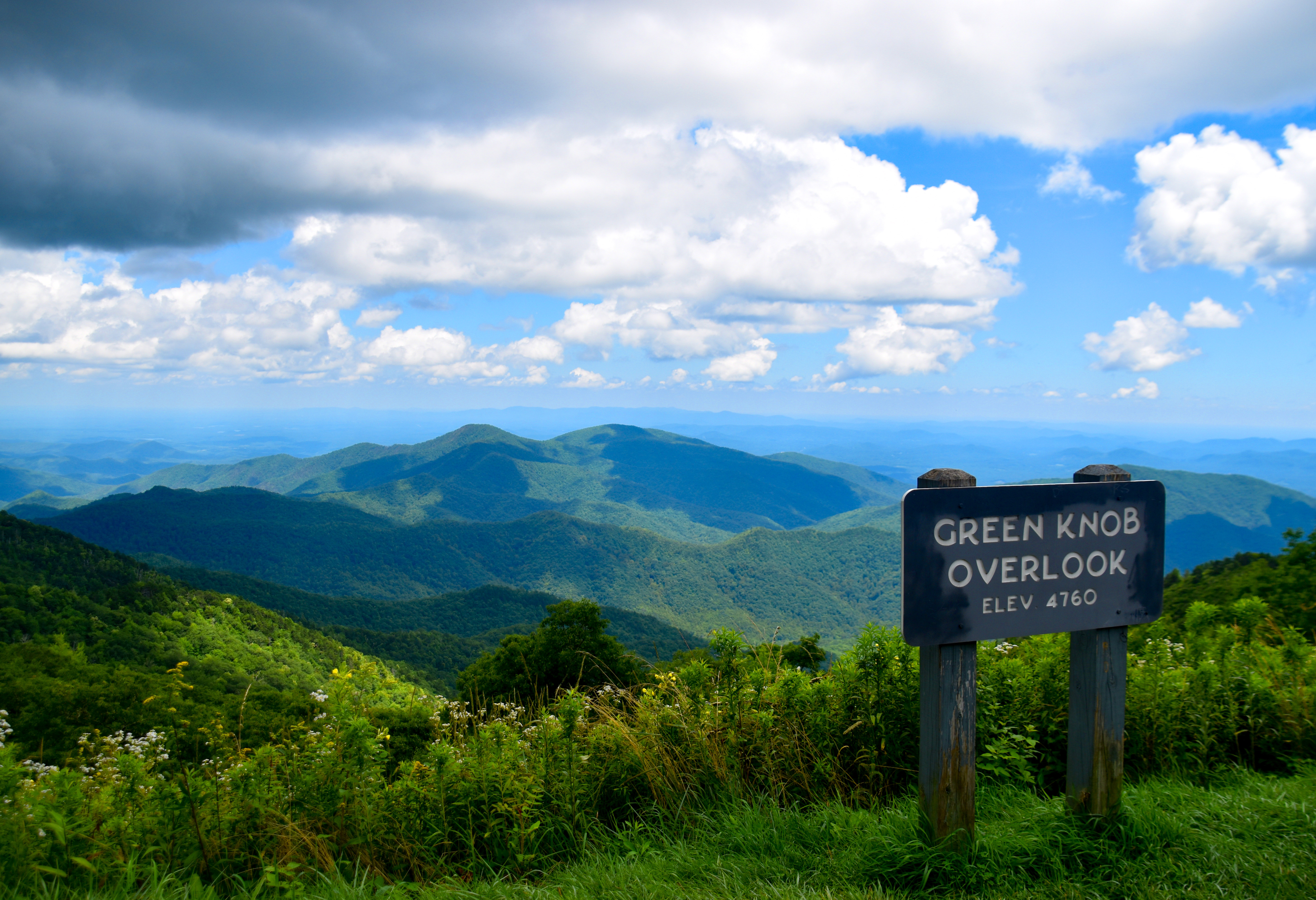
Green Knob Overlook along the Blue Ridge Parkway

Blue Ridge Parkway

  - Crabtree Falls
  - Cumberland Knob
  - Doughton Park
  - E.B. Jeffress Park
  - Julian Price Memorial Park
  - Linville Falls
  - Moses H. Cone Memorial Park
  - Mount Pisgah
  - Waterrock Knob

=== National Trails System ===
- Appalachian Trail
- Overmountain Victory National Historic Trail

=== National Seashores ===
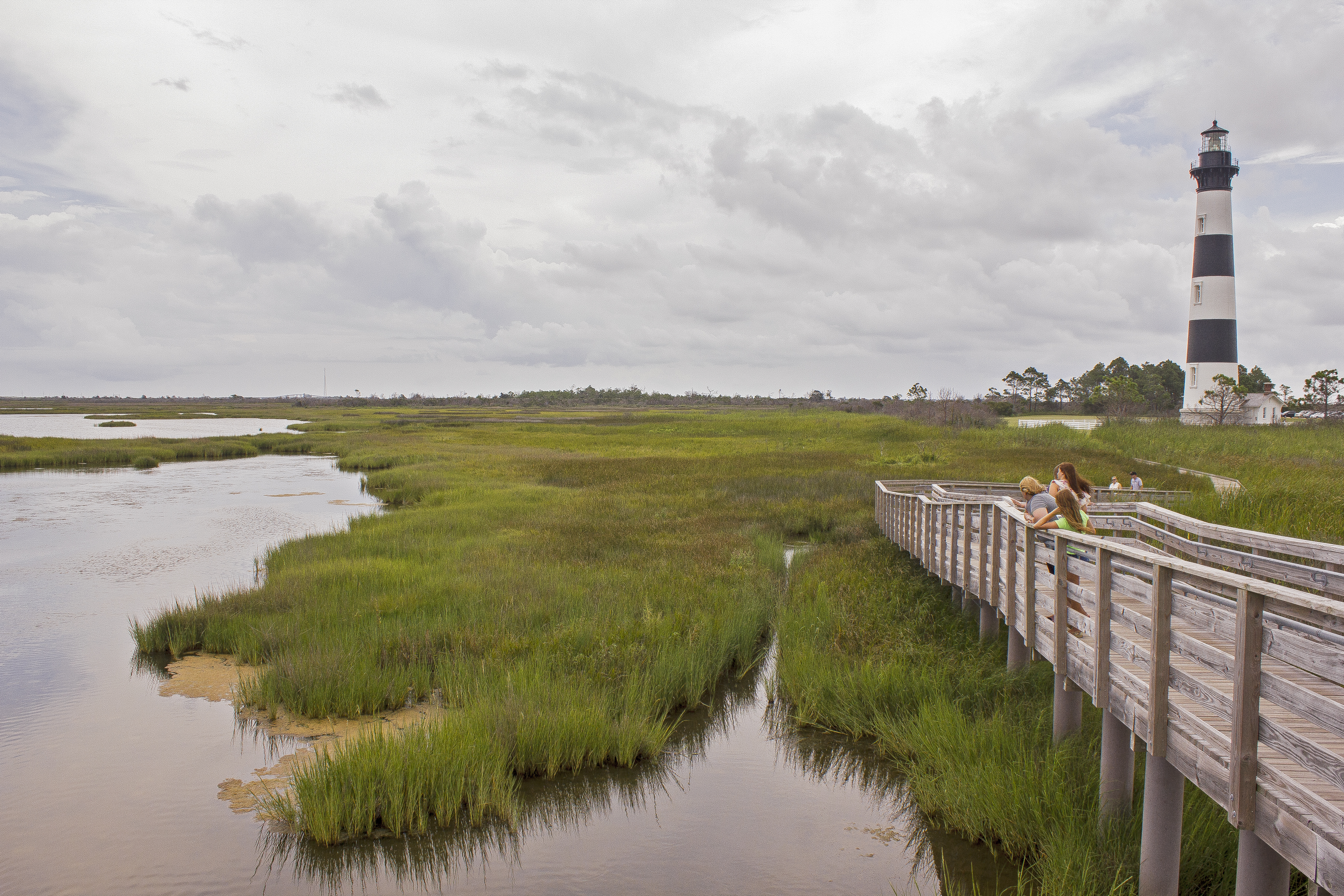
Bodie Island in Cape Hatteras National Seashore

- Cape Hatteras National Seashore
- Cape Lookout National Seashore

=== National Marine Sanctuary ===
- Monitor National Marine Sanctuary

=== National Estuarine Research Reserve ===
- Currituck Banks
- Rachel Carson
- Masonboro Island
- Zeke's Island

=== National Forests ===
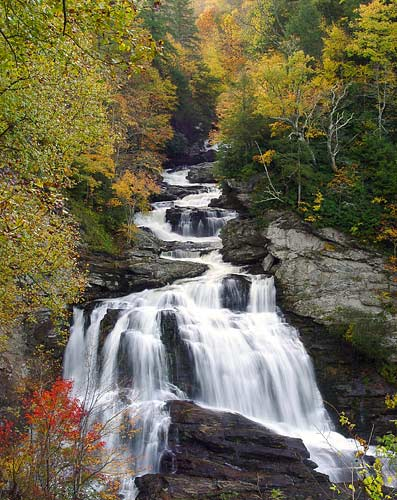
Cullusaja Falls in Nantahala National Forest

- Cherokee National Forest
- Croatan National Forest
- Nantahala National Forest
- Pisgah National Forest
- Uwharrie National Forest

=== National Wildlife Refuges ===
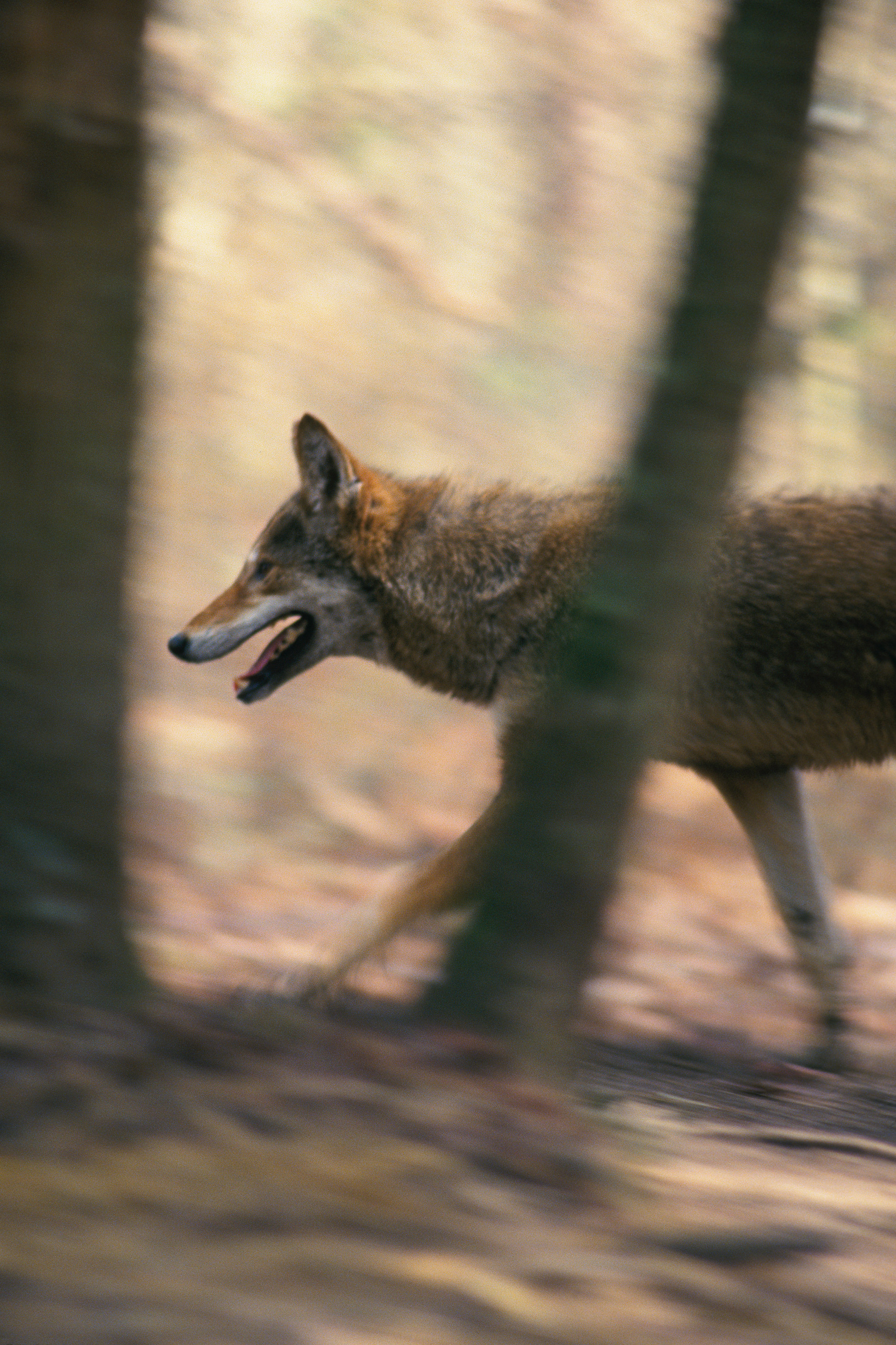
A Red Wolf; present in the Alligator River National Wildlife Refuge

- Alligator River National Wildlife Refuge
- Cedar Island National Wildlife Refuge
- Currituck National Wildlife Refuge
- Great Dismal Swamp National Wildlife Refuge
- Mackay Island National Wildlife Refuge
- Mattamuskeet National Wildlife Refuge
- Mountain Bogs National Wildlife Refuge
- Pea Island National Wildlife Refuge
- Pee Dee National Wildlife Refuge
- Pocosin Lakes National Wildlife Refuge
- Roanoke River National Wildlife Refuge
- Swanquarter National Wildlife Refuge

=== National Wilderness ===
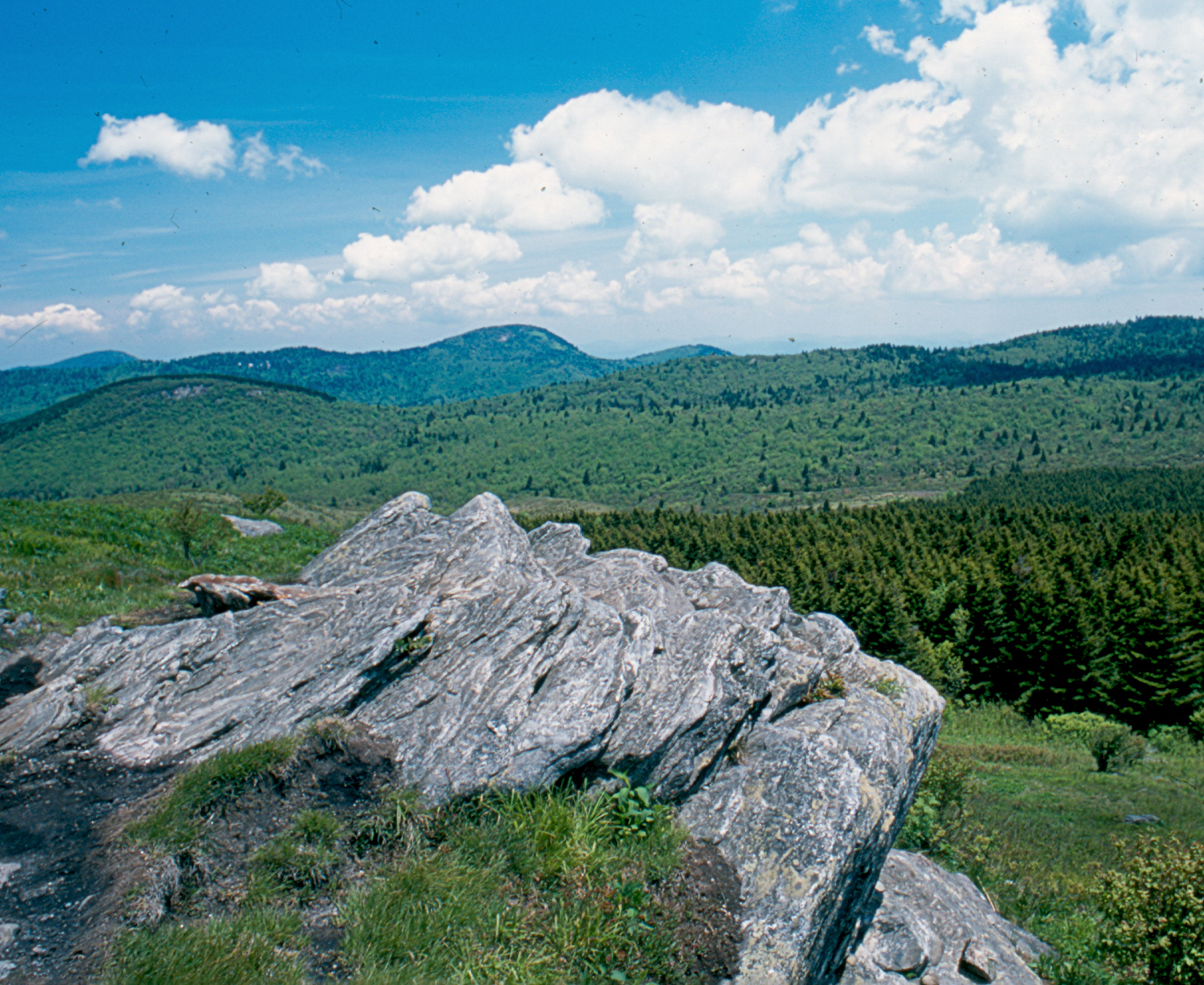
Shining Rock Wilderness

- Birkhead Mountains Wilderness
- Catfish Lake South Wilderness
- Ellicott Rock Wilderness
- Joyce Kilmer-Slickrock Wilderness
- Linville Gorge Wilderness
- Middle Prong Wilderness
- Pocosin Wilderness
- Pond Pine Wilderness
- Sheep Ridge Wilderness
- Shining Rock Wilderness
- Southern Nantahala Wilderness
- Swanquarter Wilderness

=== Wilderness Study Areas ===
- Craggy Mountain Wilderness Study Area
- Harper Creek Wilderness Study Area
- Lost Cove Wilderness Study Area
- Overflow Wilderness Study Area
- Snowbird Wilderness Study Area

=== National Wild and Scenic Rivers ===
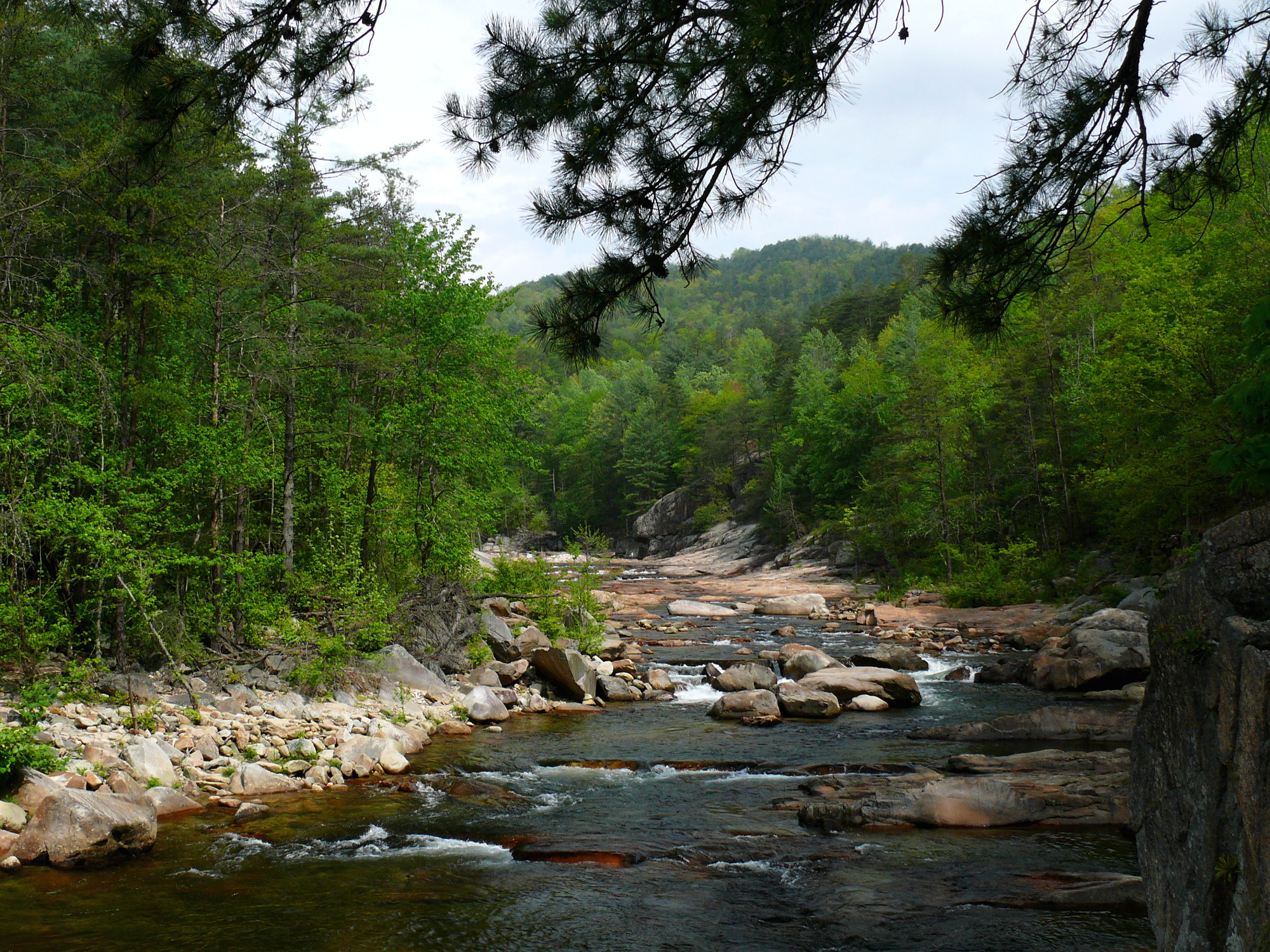
Wilson's Creek

- Chatooga River
- Horsepasture River
- Lumber River
- New River
- Wilson Creek

== State-level protection agencies ==
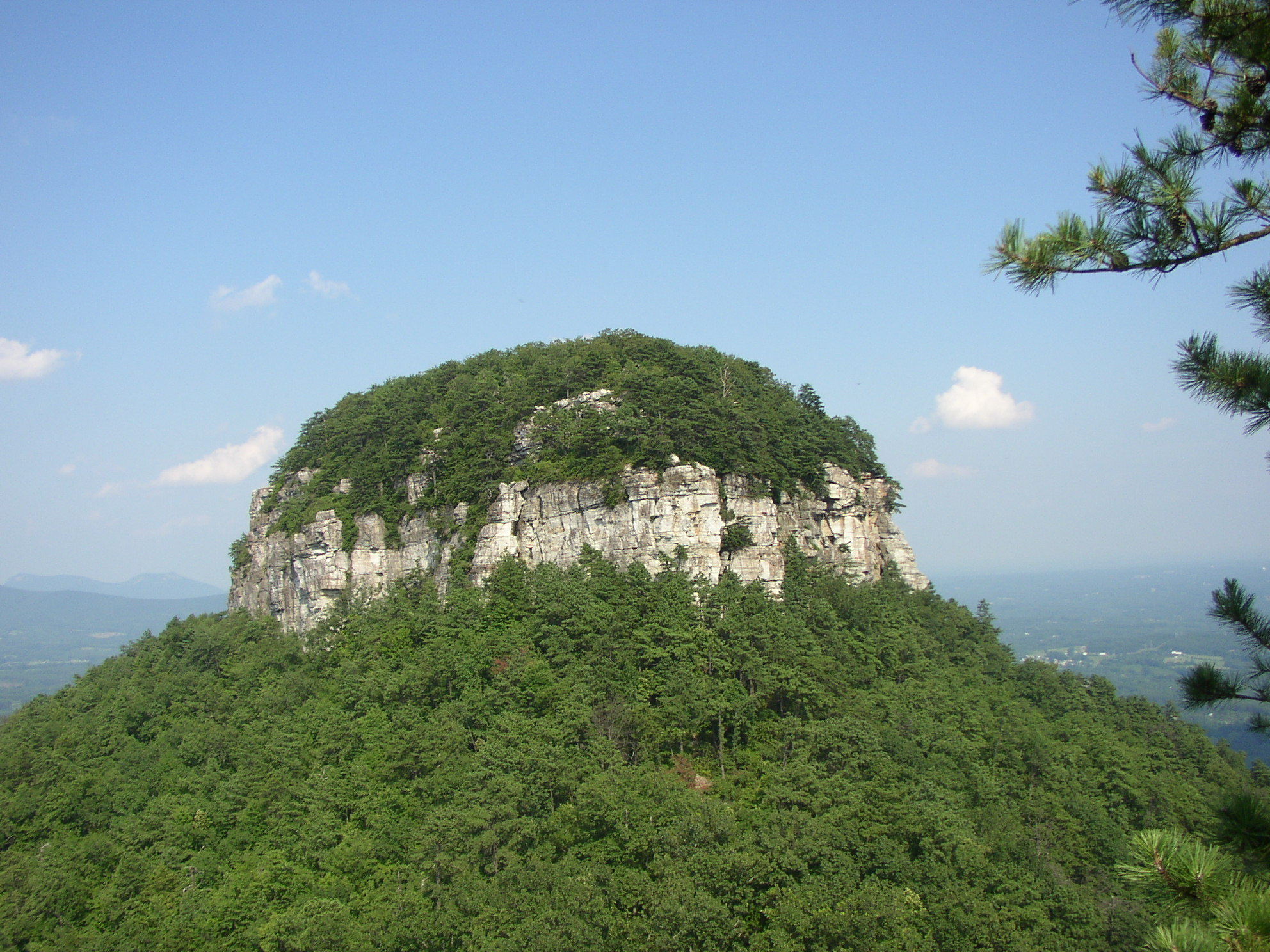
Big Pinnacle of Pilot Mountain

Out of North Carolina's protected land, 250,000 acres of land and water is managed by the North Carolina Department of Natural and Cultural Resources. These areas include State Parks, State Recreation Areas, State Natural Areas, State Lakes, State Trails, State Rivers, State Forests, Educational State Forests, State Historic Sites, and NC Coastal Reserves.

=== State Parks ===
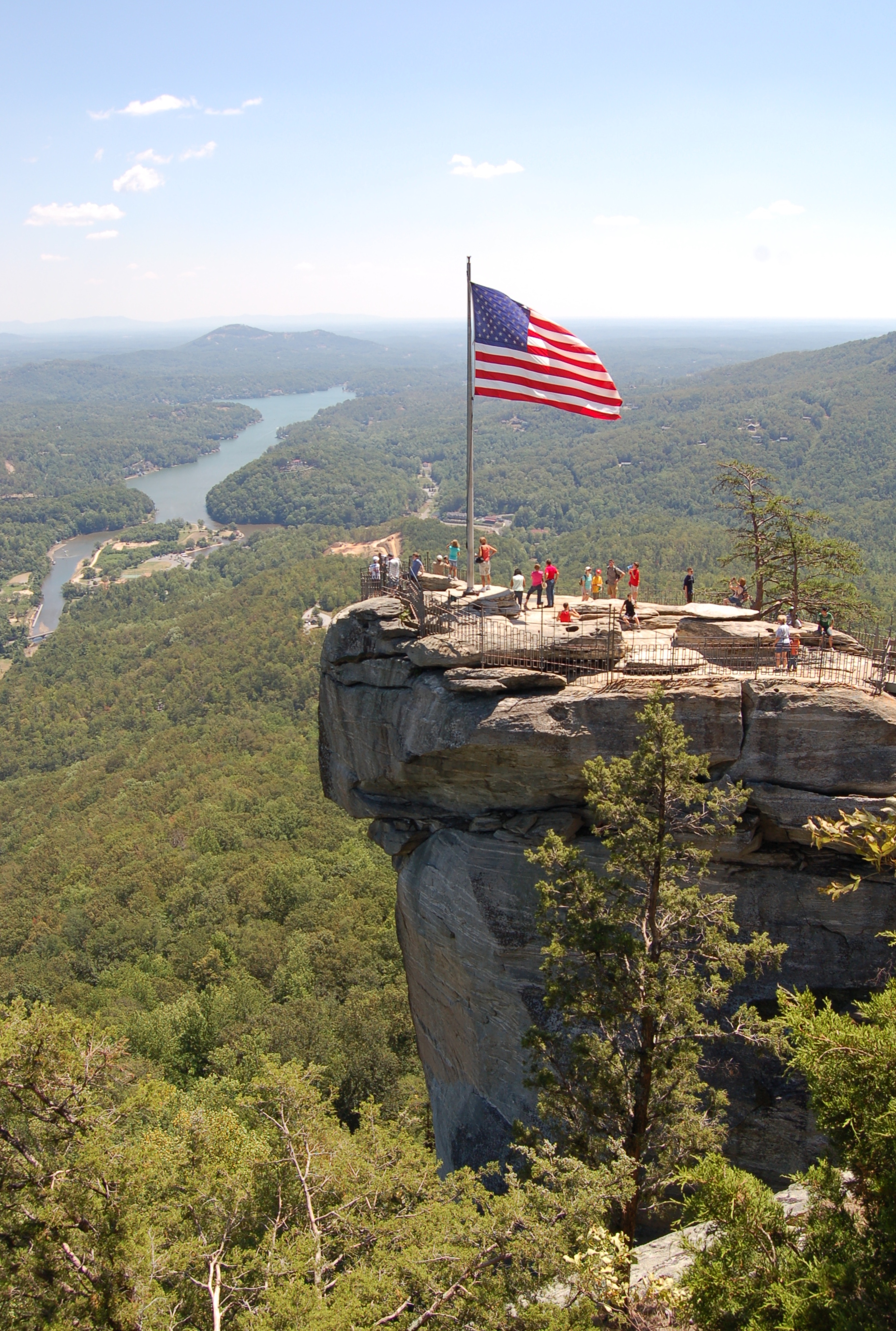
Opera Box observation point at Chimney Rock State Park

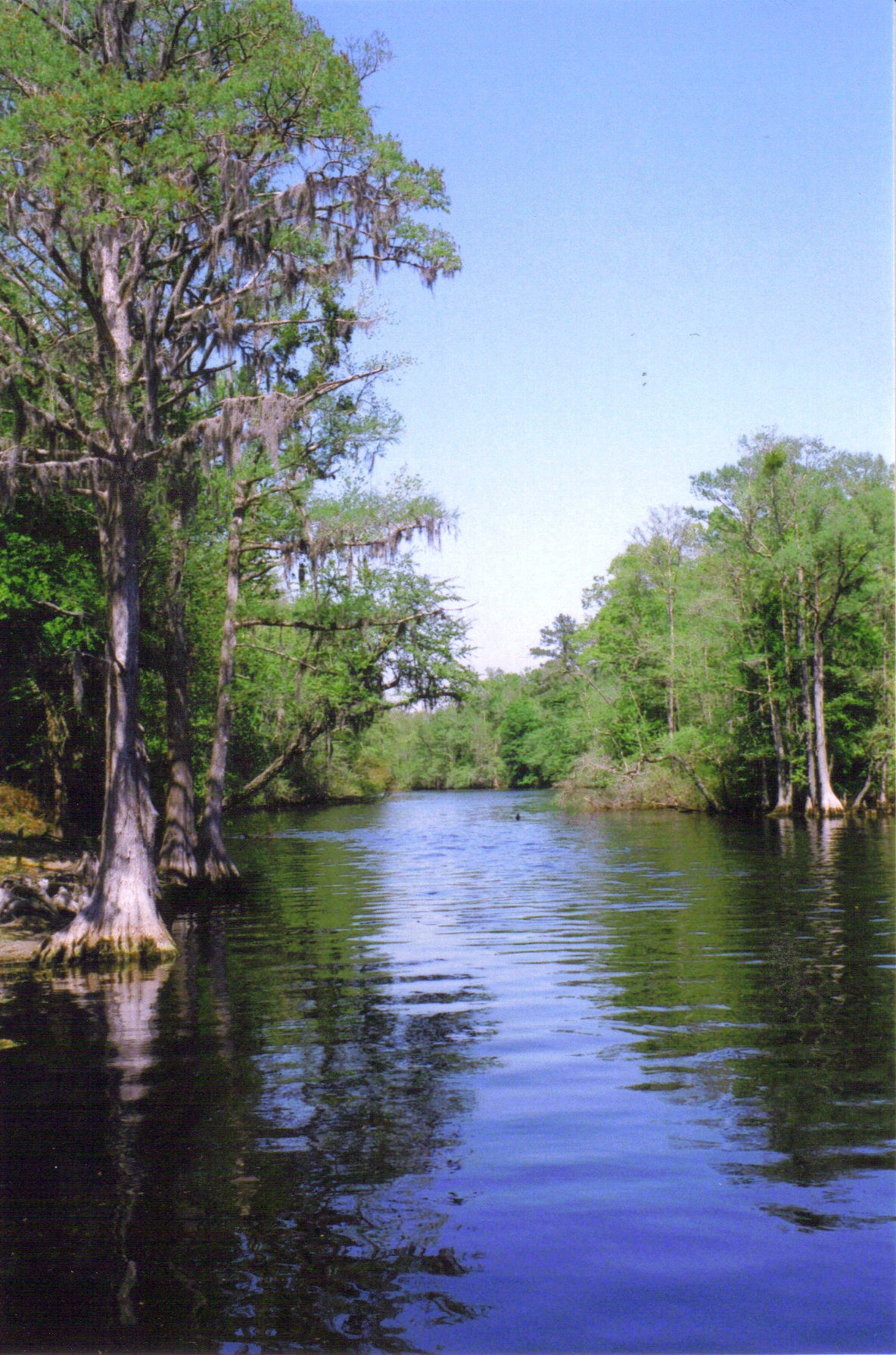
Lumber River State Park

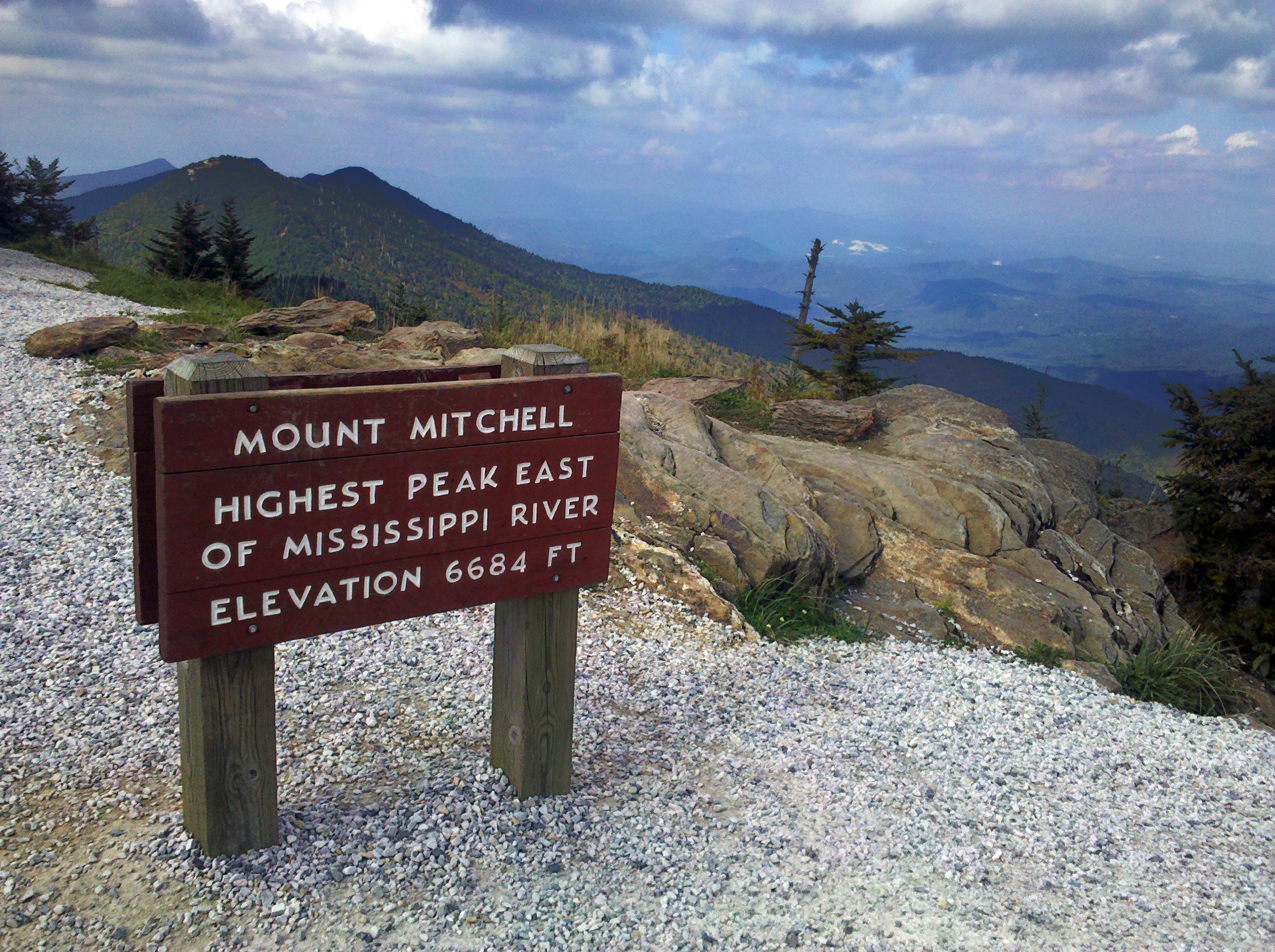
Tallest point east of the Mississippi River; Mount Mitchell State Park

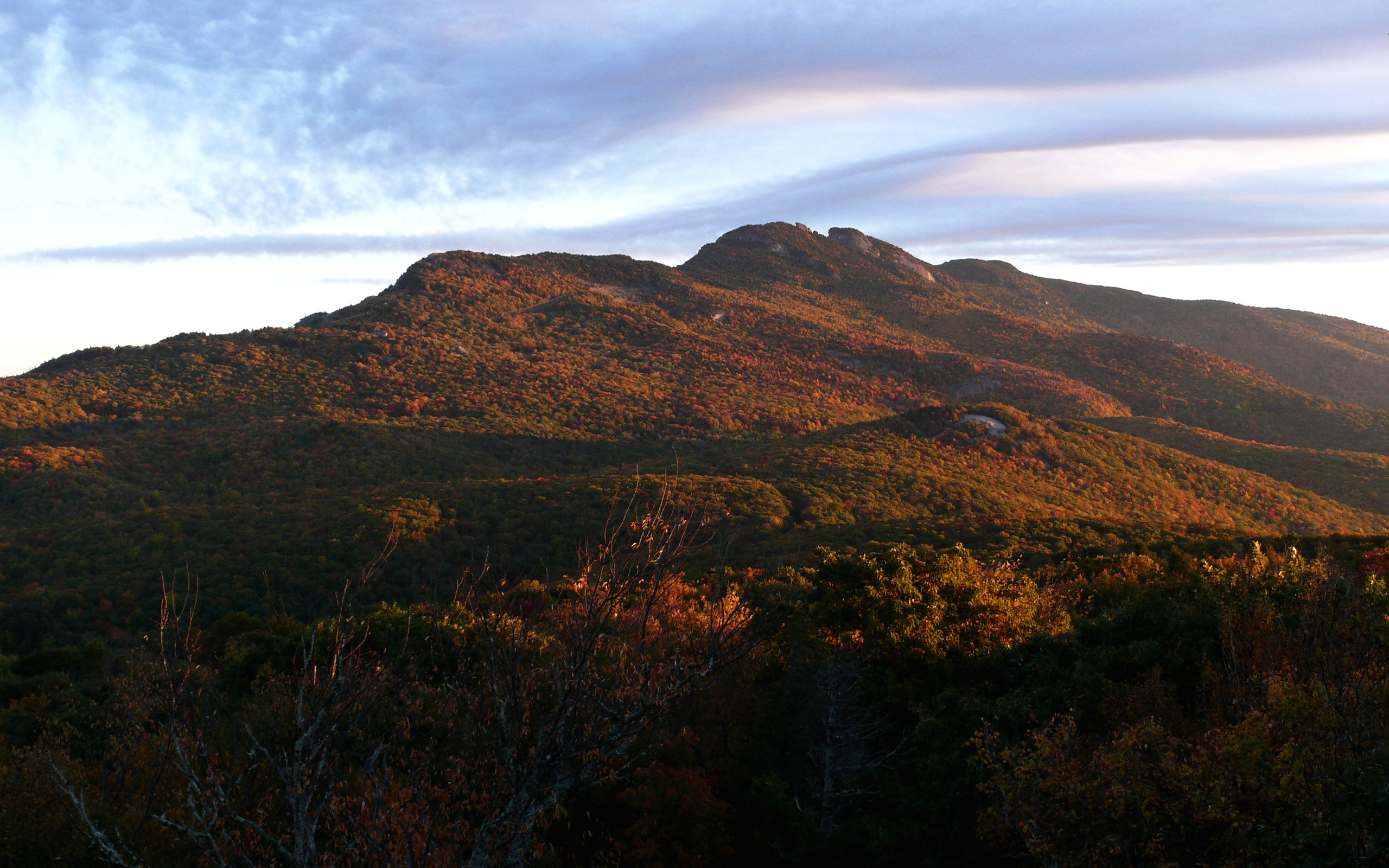
Grandfather Mountain State Park

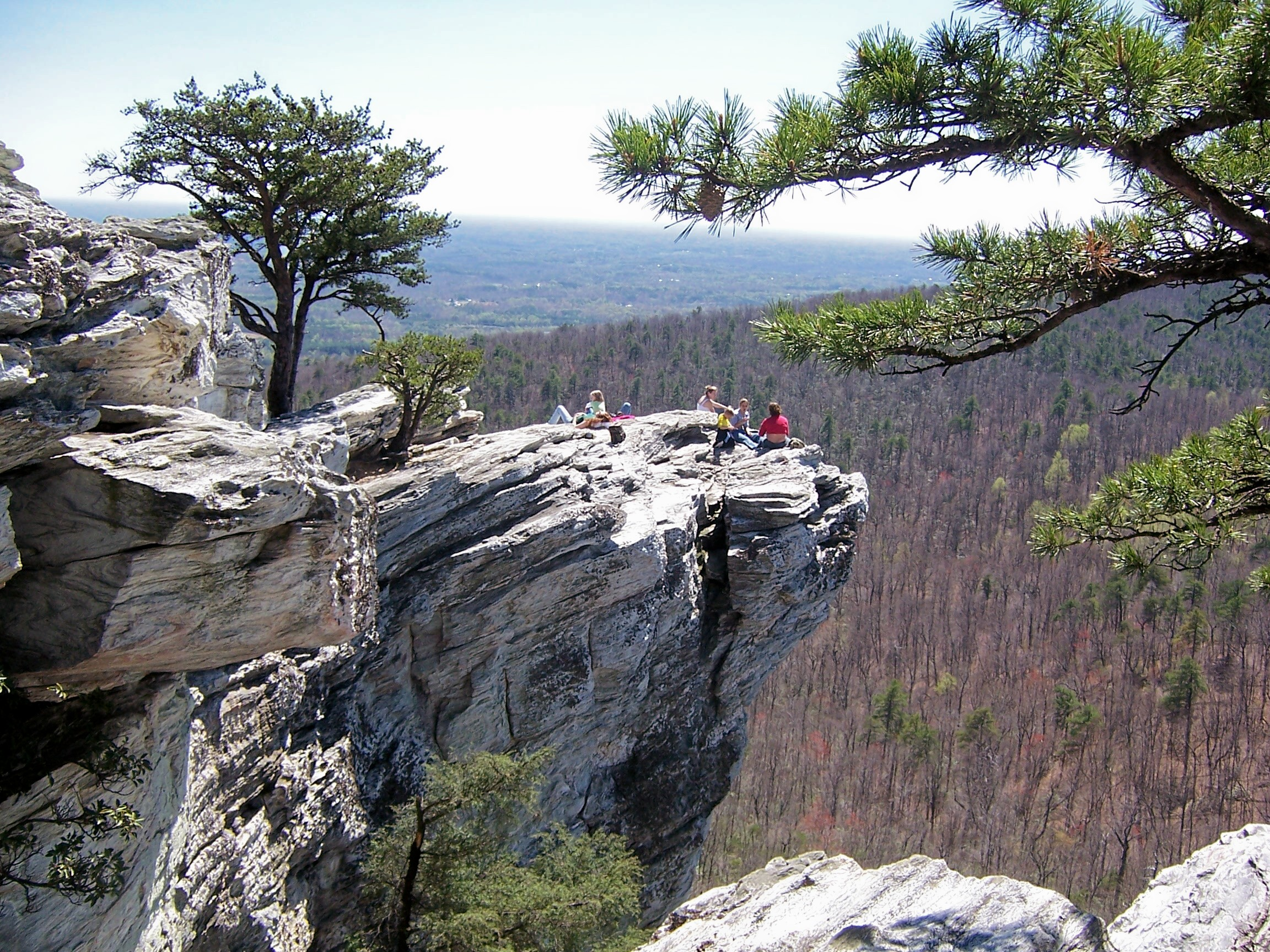
Hanging Rock State Park

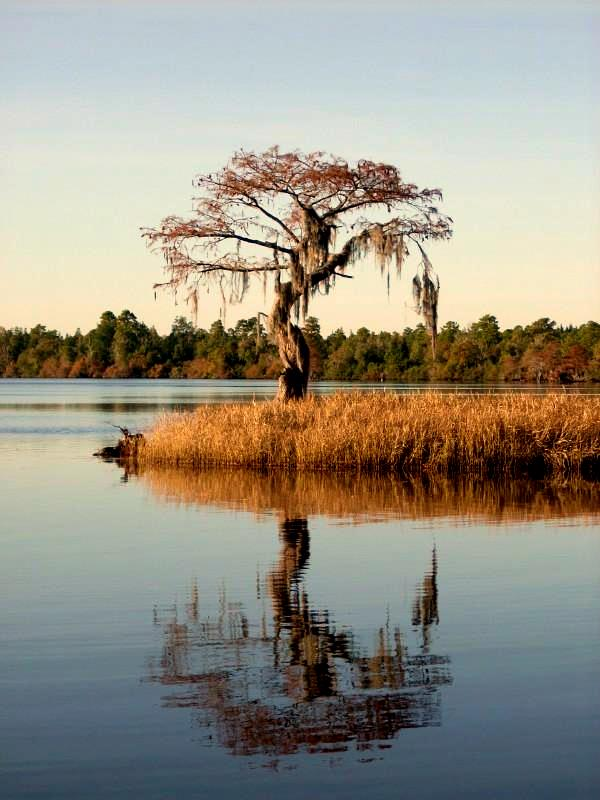
Cypress in Lake Singeltary State Park

- Carolina Beach State Park
- Carvers Creek State Park
- Chimney Rock State Park
- Cliffs of the Neuse State Park
- Crowders Mountain State Park
- Dismal Swamp State Park
- Elk Knob State Park
- Eno River State Park
- Fort Macon State Park
- Goose Creek State Park
- Gorges State Park
- Grandfather Mountain
- Hammocks Beach State Park
- Hanging Rock State Park
- Haw River State Park
- Jockey's Ridge State Park
- Jones Lake State Park
- Lake James State Park
- Lake Norman State Park
- Lake Waccamaw State Park
- Lumber River State Park
- Mayo River State Park
- Medoc Mountain State Park
- Merchants Millpond State Park
- Morrow Mountain State Park
- Mount Mitchell State Park
- New River State Park
- Pettigrew State Park
- Pilot Mountain State Park
- Pisgah View State Park
- Raven Rock State Park
- Rendezvous Mountain State Park
- Singletary Lake State Park
- South Mountains State Park
- Stone Mountain State Park
- William B. Umstead State Park

=== State Recreation Areas ===
- Falls Lake State Recreation Area
- Fort Fisher State Recreation Area
- Jordan Lake State Recreation Area
- Kerr Lake State Recreation Area

=== State Natural Areas ===
- Baldhead Island State Natural Area
- Bay Tree State Natural Area
- Bear Paw State Natural Area
- Beech Creek Bog State Natural Area
- Bobs Creek State Natural Area
- Bullhead Mountain State Natural Area
- Bushy Lake State Natural Area
- Chowan Swamp State Natural Area
- Hemlock Bluffs State Natural Area
- Lea Island State Natural Area
- Lower Haw River State Natural Area
- Masonboro Island State Natural Area
- Mitchells Millpond State Natural Area
- Mount Jefferson State Natural Area
- Occoneechee Mountain State Natural Area
- Pineola Bog State Natural Area
- Run Hill State Natural Area
- Salmon Creek State Natural Area
- Sandy Run Savannas State Natural Area
- Sugar Mountain Bog State Natural Area
- Theodore Roosevelt State Natural Area
- Warwick Mill Bay State Natural Area
- Weymouth Woods-Sandhills Nature Preserve
- Yellow Mountain State Natural Area

=== State Lakes ===
- Bay Tree Lake
- Jones Lake
- Lake Phelps
- Salters Lake
- Singletary Lake
- Lake Waccamaw
- White Lake

=== State Trails ===
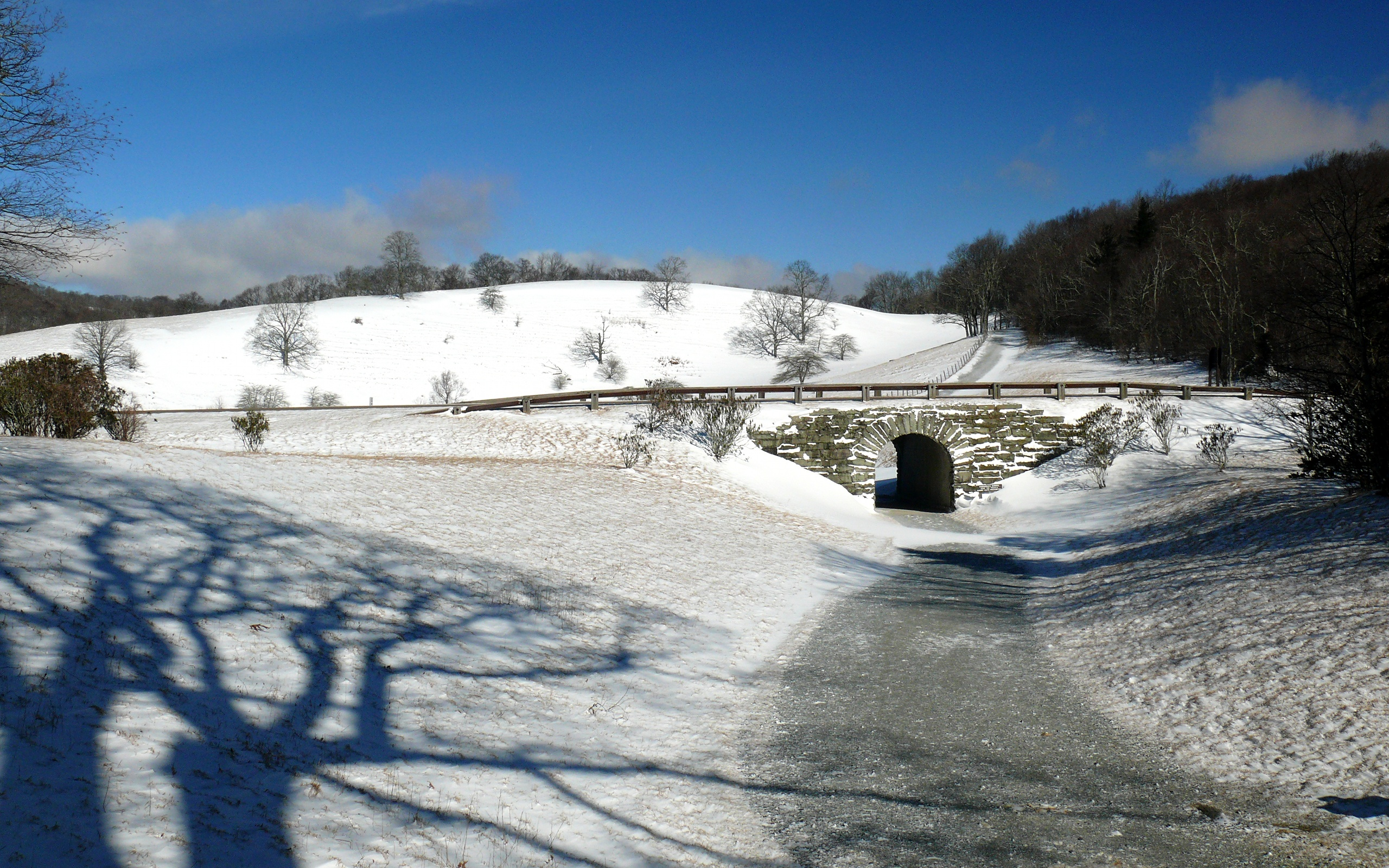
Mountains to Sea State Trail crossing under the Blue Ridge Parkway

- Dan River Trail
- Deep River State Trail
- East Coast Greenway
  - American Tobacco Trail
- Fonta Flora State Trail
- French Broad River Trail
- Hickory Nut Gorge State Trail
- Mountains-to-Sea Trail
- Northern Peaks State Trail
- Wilderness Gateway State Trail
- Yadkin River Trail

=== State Rivers ===
- Horsepasture River
- Linville River
- Lumber River
- New River

=== State Forests ===
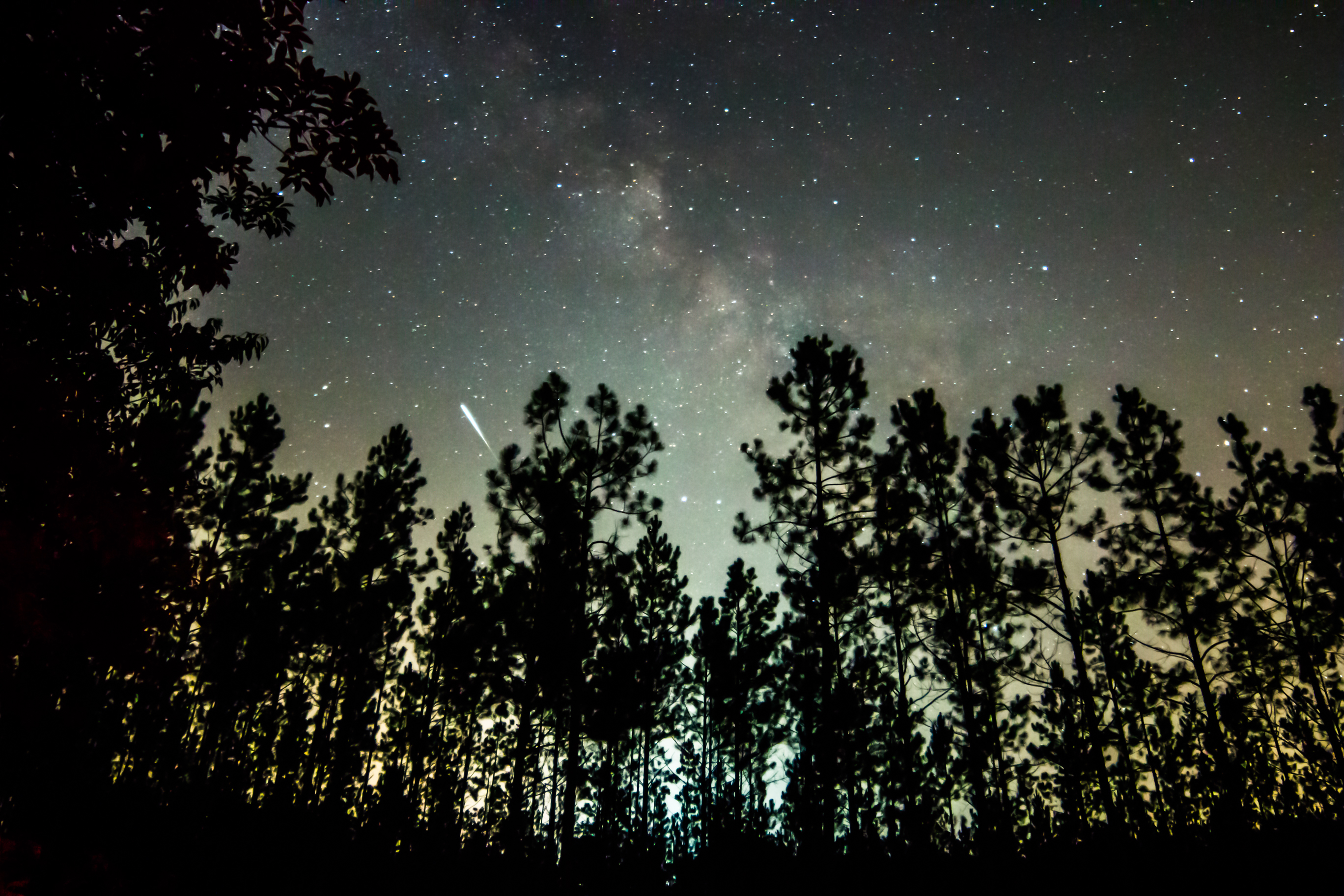
Meteor shower in Bladen Lakes State Forest

- Bladen Lakes State Forest
- DuPont State Forest
- Headwaters State Forest
- Rendezvous Mountain State Forest

=== Educational State Forests ===
- Clemmons Educational State Forest
- Holmes Educational State Forest
- Jordan Lake Educational State Forest
- Mountain Island Educational State Forest
- Turnbull Creek Educational State Forest
- Tuttle Educational State Forest

=== State Historic Sites ===
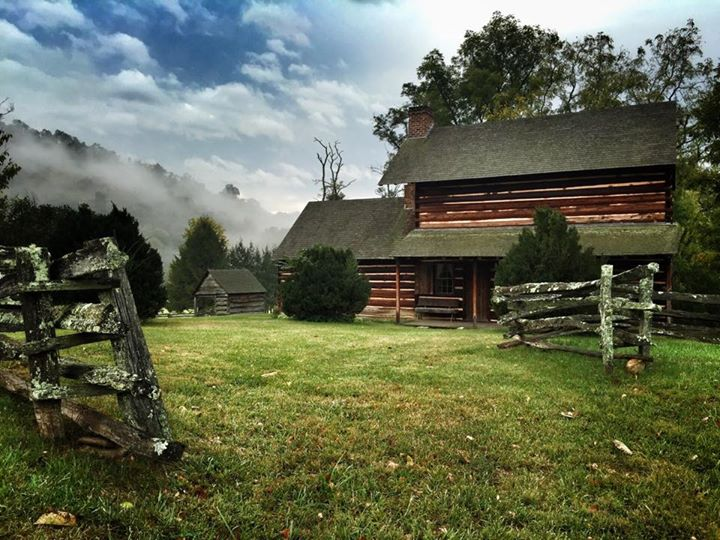
Zebulon B. Vance Birthplace State Historic Site

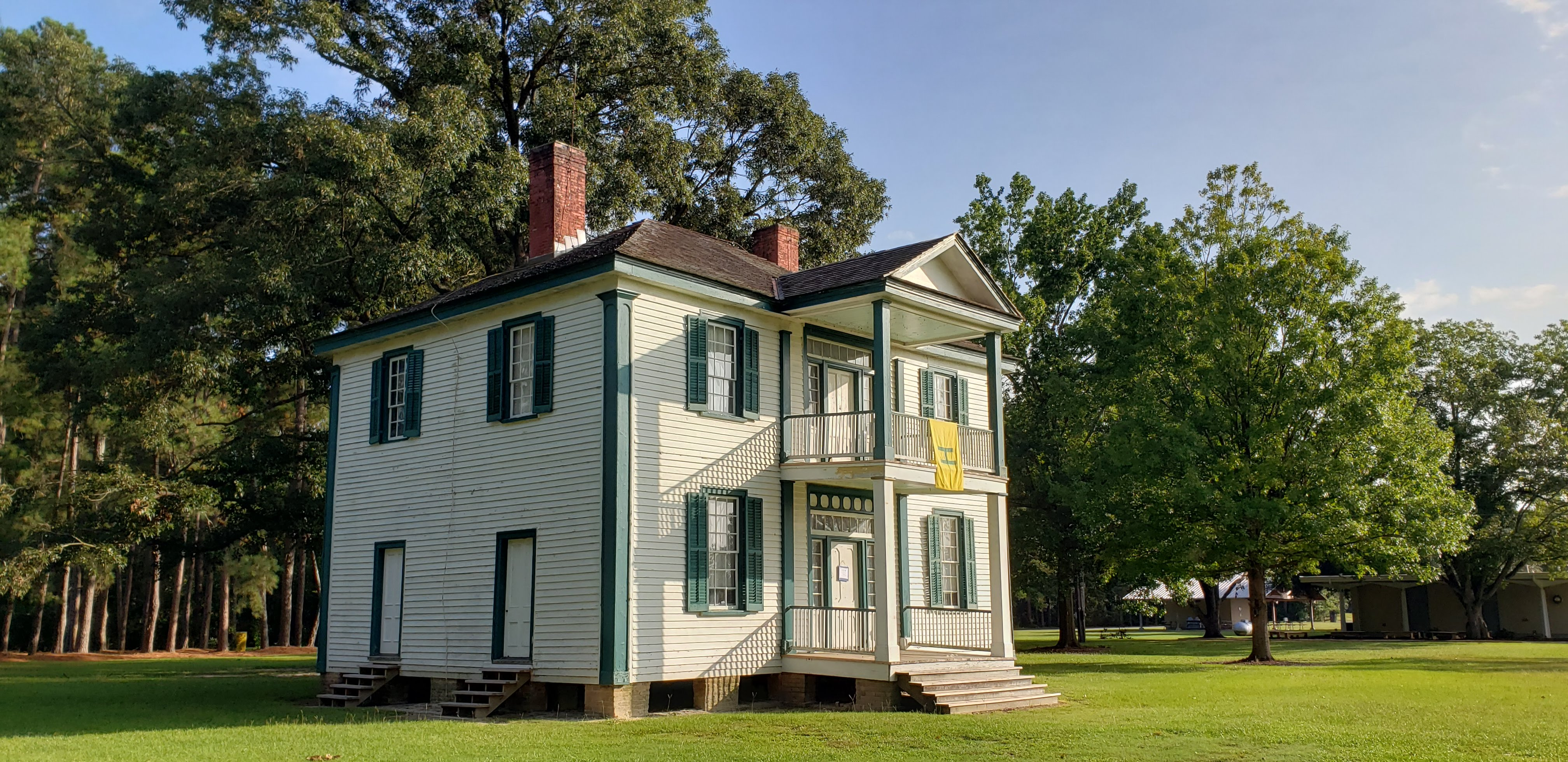
Harper House at Bentonville Battlefield State Historic Site

Tryon Palace State Historic Site

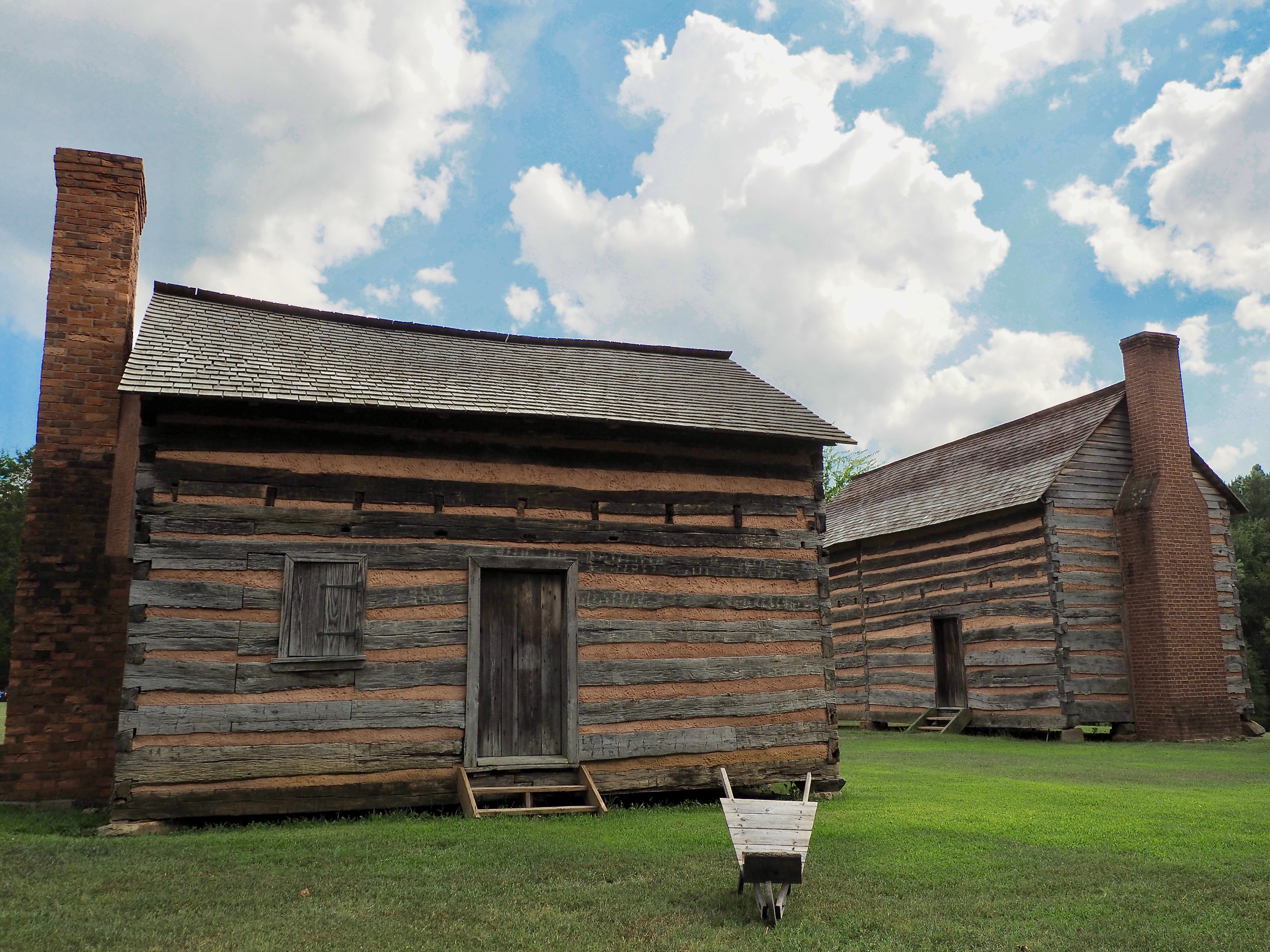
President James K. Polk State Historic Site, Pineville, NC

- Alamance Battleground
- Aycock Birthplace
- Historic Bath
- Bennett Place
- Bentonville Battlefield
- Brunswick Town
- Fort Anderson
- CSS Neuse
- Palmer Memorial Institute
- Duke Homestead and Tobacco Factory
- Edenton Historic District
- Fort Dobbs
- Fort Fisher
- Halifax Historic District
- Horne Creek Living Historical Farm
- House in the Horseshoe
- North Carolina Transportation Museum
- President James K. Polk Historic Site
- Reed Gold Mine
- Somerset Place
- Stagville
- North Carolina State Capitol
- Town Creek Indian Mound
- Tryon Palace
- Zebulon B. Vance Birthplace
- Thomas Wolfe House

=== North Carolina Coastal Reserves ===
- Kitty Hawk Woods North Carolina Coastal Reserve
- Emily and Richardson Preyer Buckridge North Carolina Coastal Reserve
- Buxton Woods North Carolina Coastal Reserve
- Permuda Island
- Bald Head Woods North Carolina Coastal Reserve
- Bird Island

== Other ==
- List of nature centers in North Carolina
- North Carolina game land
