= Rachel Carson North Carolina National Estuarine Research Reserve =

Coordinates: 34.7026546°N 76.6387694°W

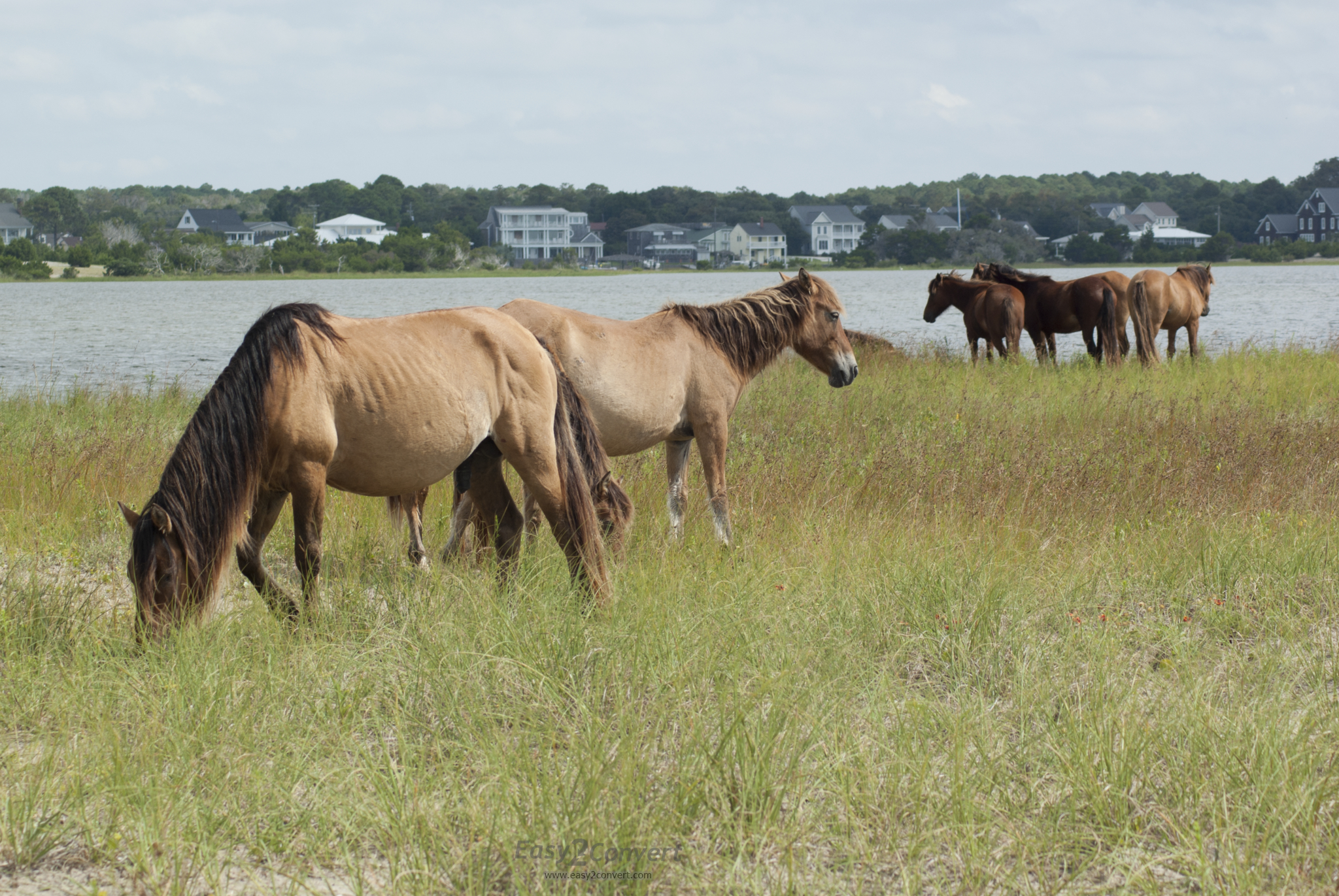
Banker Horses on Carrot Island

Rachel Carson North Carolina National Estuarine Research Reserve or the Rachel Carson Reserve is a component site of the North Carolina National Estuarine Research Reserve consisting of two islands and several shoals, banks, and marshes, south of Beaufort, North Carolina. Named after marine biologist Rachel Carson, it is one of three original National Estuarine Research Reserve sites dedicated by NOAA in 1985. The reserve encompasses 2,315 acres of varied habitat.

== Description ==
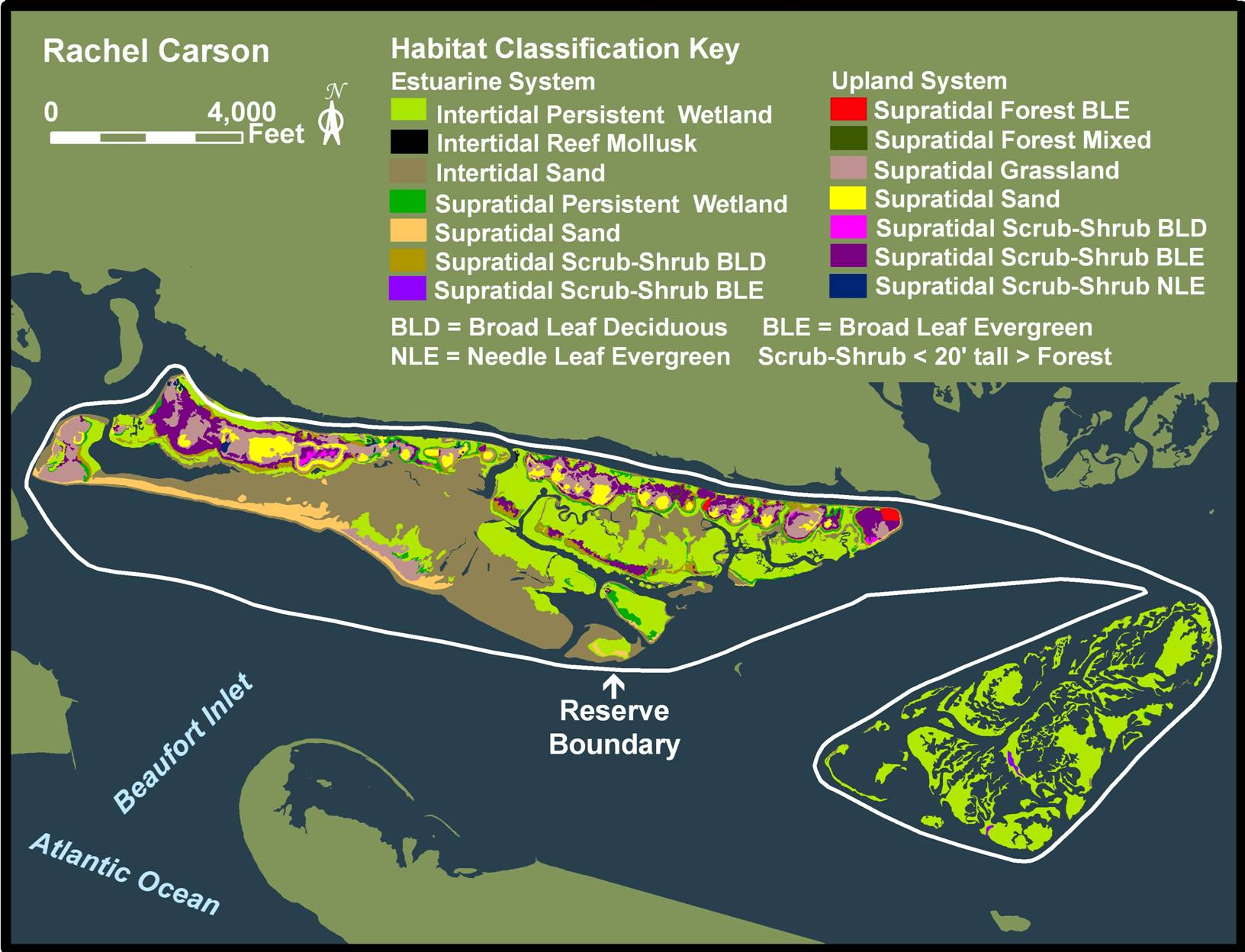
Habitat map of the reserve

The reserve consists of two sites. The main part of the site, just south of Beaufort, is a complex of islands which includes Carrot Island, Town Marsh, Bird Shoal, and Horse Island, all bounded by the Newport River to the west and the North River to the east. The remainder of the park is across the north river channel, consisting of the Middle Marshes, a swampy tidal zone surrounded by the Back Sound. Tidal flats, salt marshes, sand dunes, shrub thicket, submerged aquatic vegetation, and maritime forest all exist throughout the preserve, along with a profusion of local wildlife and migratory birds.

A herd of Banker Horses lives on the Reserve, having been present on the islands since the 1940s. It is unclear whether the Bankers swam over from nearby Shackleford or were left by residents who had used the islands to graze livestock. They are owned and managed by the state of North Carolina and regarded as a cultural resource.

No management action was taken until the late 1980s and early 1990s, when after years of flourishing population, the island's carrying capacity was exceeded. Malnourishment caused by overcrowding resulted in the deaths of several horses; the reserve's staff instituted a birth control program to restrict the herd to about 40 animals.

The western part of the reserve was acquired by the state government in 1985; the Middle Marshes were acquired in 1989.

== See also ==
- Currituck Banks
- Masonboro Island
- Assateague Island
