= North Carolina National Estuarine Research Reserve =

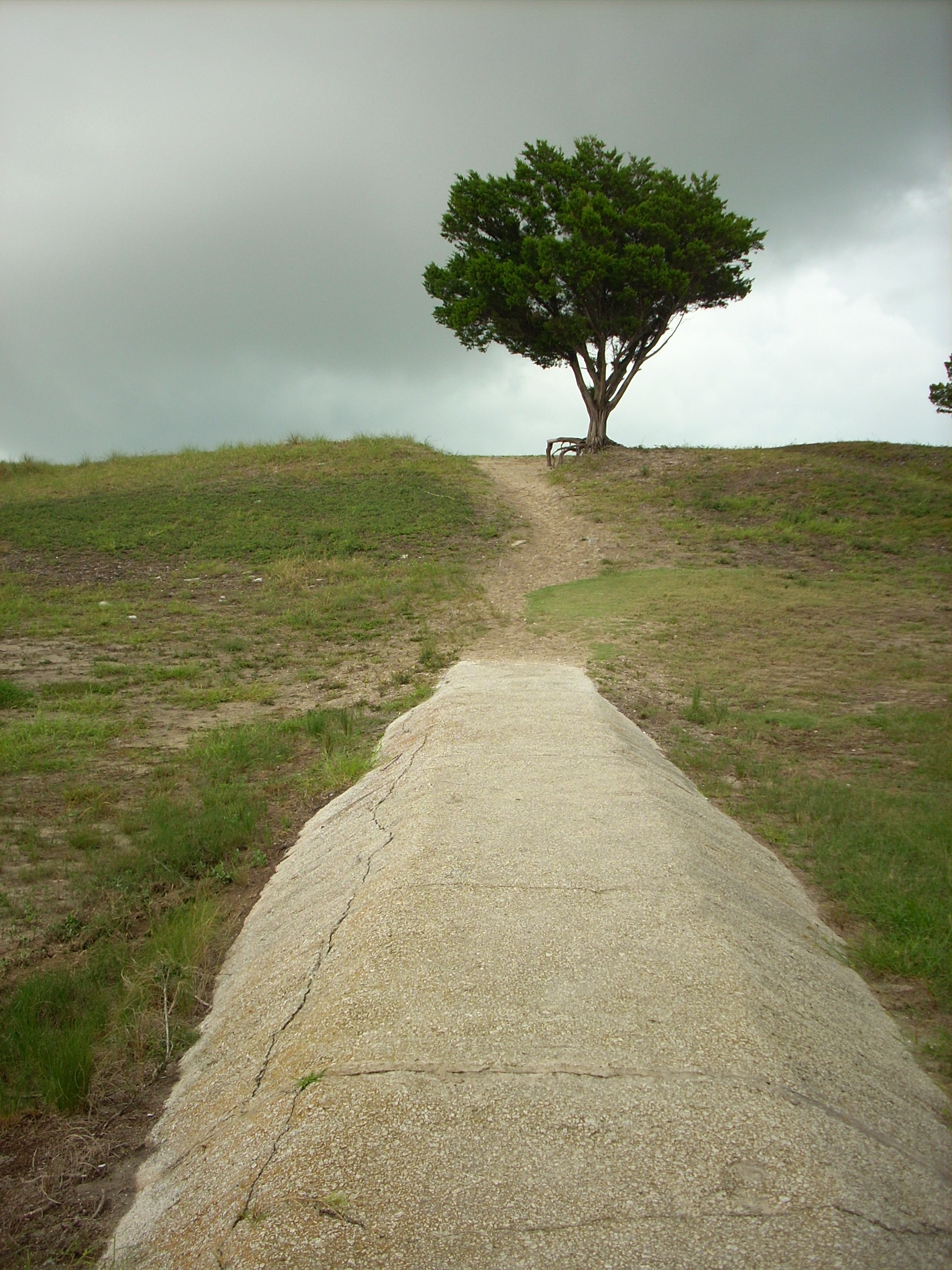
- Buchanan Battery at Zeke's Island

Agency overview
- Formed: 1985
- Jurisdiction: 16.51 sq mi (42.76 km^{2}) of North Carolina
- Parent agency: National Estuarine Research Reserve; North Carolina Department of Environmental Quality
- Website: www.deq.nc.gov/about/divisions/coastal-management/nc-coastal-reserve

The estuarine system of the North Carolina National Estuarine Research Reserve is the third largest in the country, encompassing more the 44,000 acres (18,000 ha). This system is of prime economic importance to the coastal area—90 percent of the commercial seafood species caught in the state spends at least part of their lives in an estuary. The North Carolina National Estuarine Research Reserve was established to preserve these fragile natural areas and the variety of life they support.

The state is representative of two major biogeographic regions located north (Virginian) and south (Carolinian) of Cape Hatteras. Therefore, NOAA and the state of North Carolina created a multi-component reserve with the following sites: Currituck Banks (960 acres near Corolla), Rachel Carson Reserve (2,625 acres near Beaufort), Masonboro Island (5,097 acres near Wrightsville Beach) and Zeke's Island (1,165 acres near Kure Beach).

== Notes ==
Preceded by Fort Fisher	Beaches of Southeastern North Carolina	Succeeded by Bald Head Island
