= Wrightsville Beach, North Carolina =

- Town
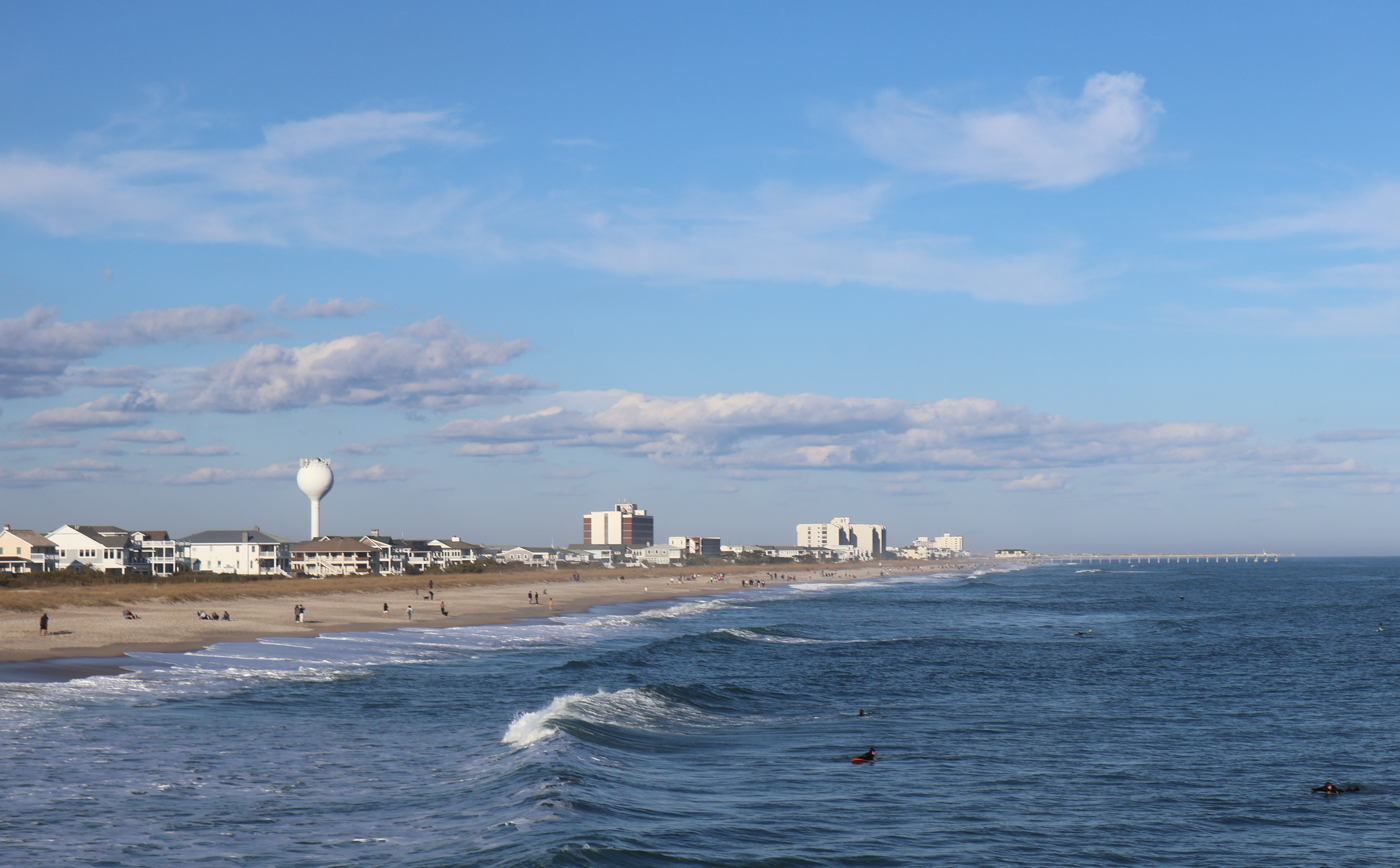
- Wrightsville Beach shoreline seen from Crystal Pier

- Flag Seal

- Location in New Hanover County and the state of North Carolina.
- Coordinates: 34°12′41″N 77°47′47″W
- Country: United States
- State: North Carolina
- County: New Hanover
- Township: Harnett Township
- Named for: Joshua G. Wright

Government
  - Mayor: Darryl Mills

Area
  - Total: 2.27 sq mi (5.89 km^{2})
  - Land: 1.39 sq mi (3.61 km^{2})
  - Water: 0.88 sq mi (2.28 km^{2})
- Elevation: 0 ft (0 m)

Population (2020)
  - Total: 2,473
  - Density: 1,773.3/sq mi (684.67/km^{2})
- Time zone: UTC-5 (Eastern (EST))
  - Summer (DST): UTC-4 (EDT)
- ZIP code: 28480
- Area codes: 910, 472
- FIPS code: 37-75820
- GNIS feature ID: 2406920
- Website: www.townofwrightsvillebeach.com

Wrightsville Beach is a town in New Hanover County, North Carolina, United States. Wrightsville Beach is just east of Wilmington and is part of the Wilmington metropolitan area. The population was 2,473 at the 2020 census. The town consists of a 4.6-mile (7 km) long beach island, an interior island called Harbor Island. It served as a filming location of Dawson's Creek and The Summer I Turned Pretty. The movie Weekend at Bernie's was also partially filmed in Wrightsville Beach.

== History ==
=== Establishment ===
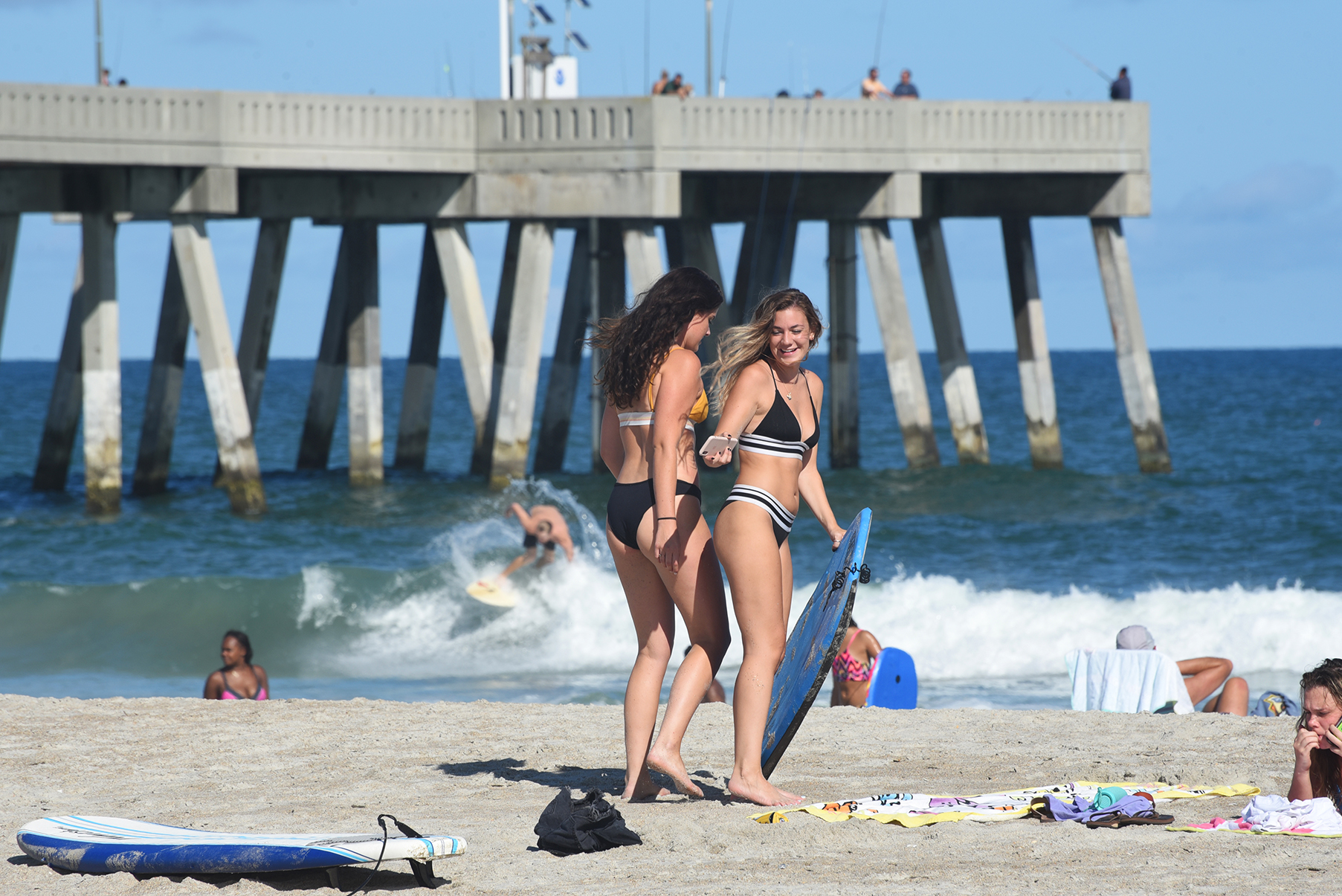
Wrightsville Beach is a popular spot for teenagers and students of the University of North Carolina Wilmington nearby

The first documented history of present-day Wrightsville Beach began when the Lords Proprietors granted land to Charles Harrison in 1725. The land grant was for 640 acres (259 ha) located north of the present day Heide Trask Bridge that runs over the Intracoastal Waterway and was the first formal ownership of property near the beach. In the 1700 and 1800s the Hammocks (Harbor Island) were accessible by a footbridge from the mainland, but the beach itself was only accessible by boat.

In 1853, the Carolina Yacht Club was founded by seven local men who loved to sail and race boats. It is currently known as the seventh oldest Yacht club in America. It was the first permanent structure on the beach and was only accessible by boat. This was followed by a few scattered cottages and commercial buildings began springing up on what was then known as Ocean View Beach.

The town bears the name of Joshua G. Wright of Wilmington (1842–1890), who developed a local realtor company. A post office called Wrightsville was subsequently established in 1881. Accessibility to the beach improved in 1887 when Shell Road was completed, running from Wilmington to the edge of the current Intracoastal Waterway. The town was incorporated in 1899 as Wrightsville Beach, in honor of the Wright family of Wilmington and the community of Wrightsville on the mainland side of Harbor Island.

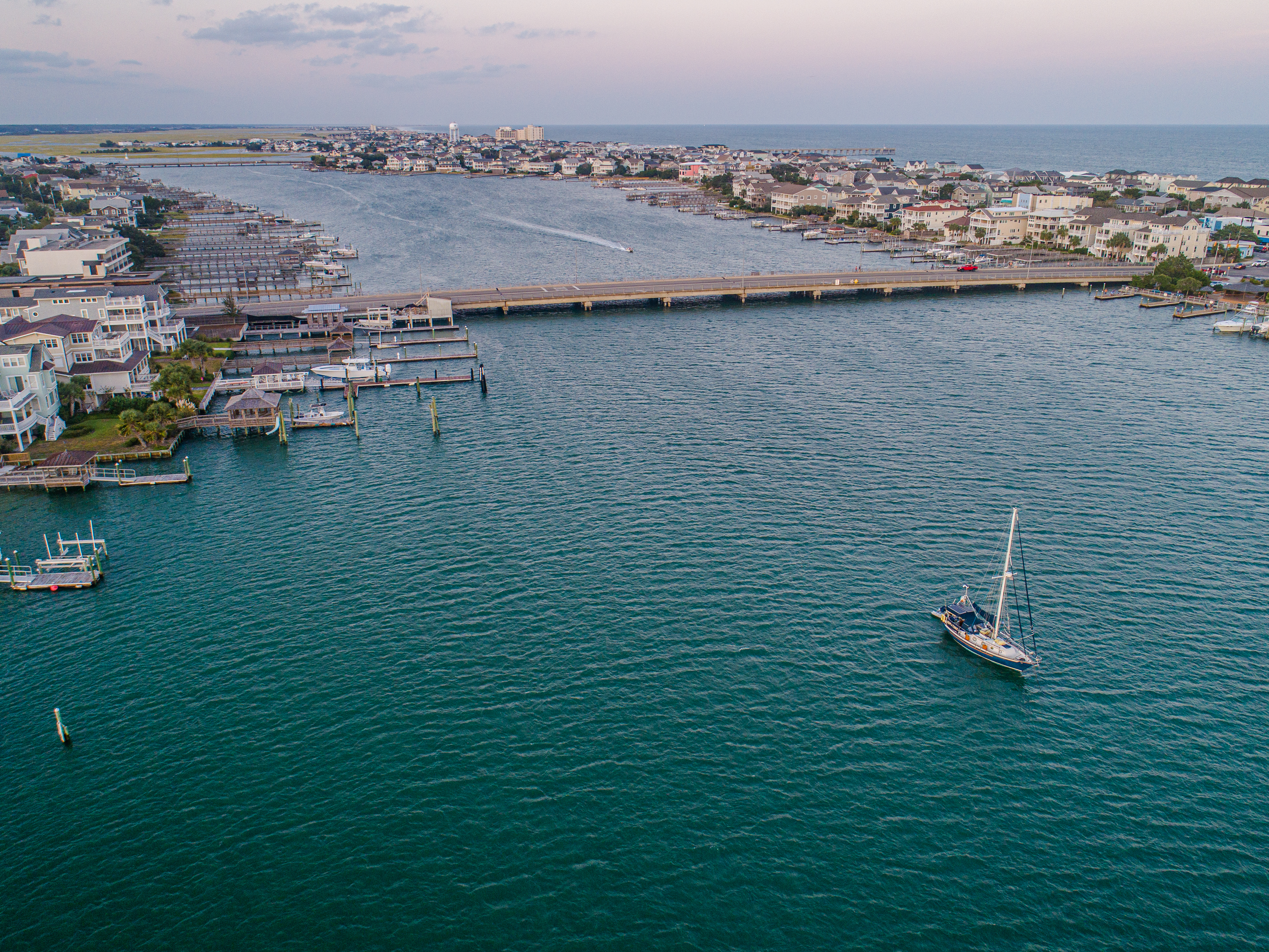
Wrightsville Beach Aerial Photo showcasing Banks Channel

=== Development ===
By the late 1800s, ownership of the land had passed to the MacRae family of Wilmington. In 1887 passenger service began on the Wilmington Sea Coast Railroad from Wilmington, bringing people from downtown Wilmington to the edge of Bradley Creek. In 1889, the Ocean View Railroad built a track across Banks Channel to carry visitors to the oceanfront.

Having already established a power generation company, in 1902 Hugh MacRae (March 30, 1865 - October 20, 1951) took control of the city of Wilmington's utilities by forming the Consolidated Railroad, Power & Light Company (CRPLCo, subsequently renamed the Tidewater Power Company, which became part of the Carolina Power & Light Company in 1952 post-MacRae's death). The Ocean View Railroad was subsequently converted to an electric streetcar. After MacRae took over the Wilmington Sea Coast Railroad, he consolidated the area's lines into one electric streetcar system, carrying people from downtown Wilmington to one of seven stations along what became South Lumina Avenue. Automobiles were not to be found on Wrightsville Beach until the causeway was built in 1926 , giving the CRPLCo streetcar a virtual monopoly on transportation. The streetcar operations also carried freight with adapted freight cars, often part of the operations consist mainly of carrying ice in an era before indoor refrigeration was available, allowing the subsequent development of far more snack stands and soda shops along the beach.

With the CRPLCo electric streetcar now in operation, the MacRae family began developing plots of land both along the streetcar line and Wrightsville Beach as a beach resort. The two hotels on the beach were renovated, and the first public entertainment venue on the beach was built, named Lumina, because of the 6,000 exterior lights that illuminated the building. It was opened in 1905 with a 25,000 square feet (2,300 m^{2}) venue for dancing and socializing, games, food, and entertainment. It attracted many entertainers and musicians, including the Big Bands of the 1930s and 40s. In 1913, Lumina enlarged the dance floor and added a movie screen in the surf from which they showed silent films. After World War II, its popularity slowly declined due to the cancellation of the trolley service to the beach in 1940 and the growing number of other entertainment venues in and around the area. Lumina changed hands a few times after the war as people tried various ways to make it the hottest spot on the beach. It was a skating alley and then a bar before it was closed in 1972. The health department then condemned lumina. It was condemned in 1973 and beachside condominiums took its place.

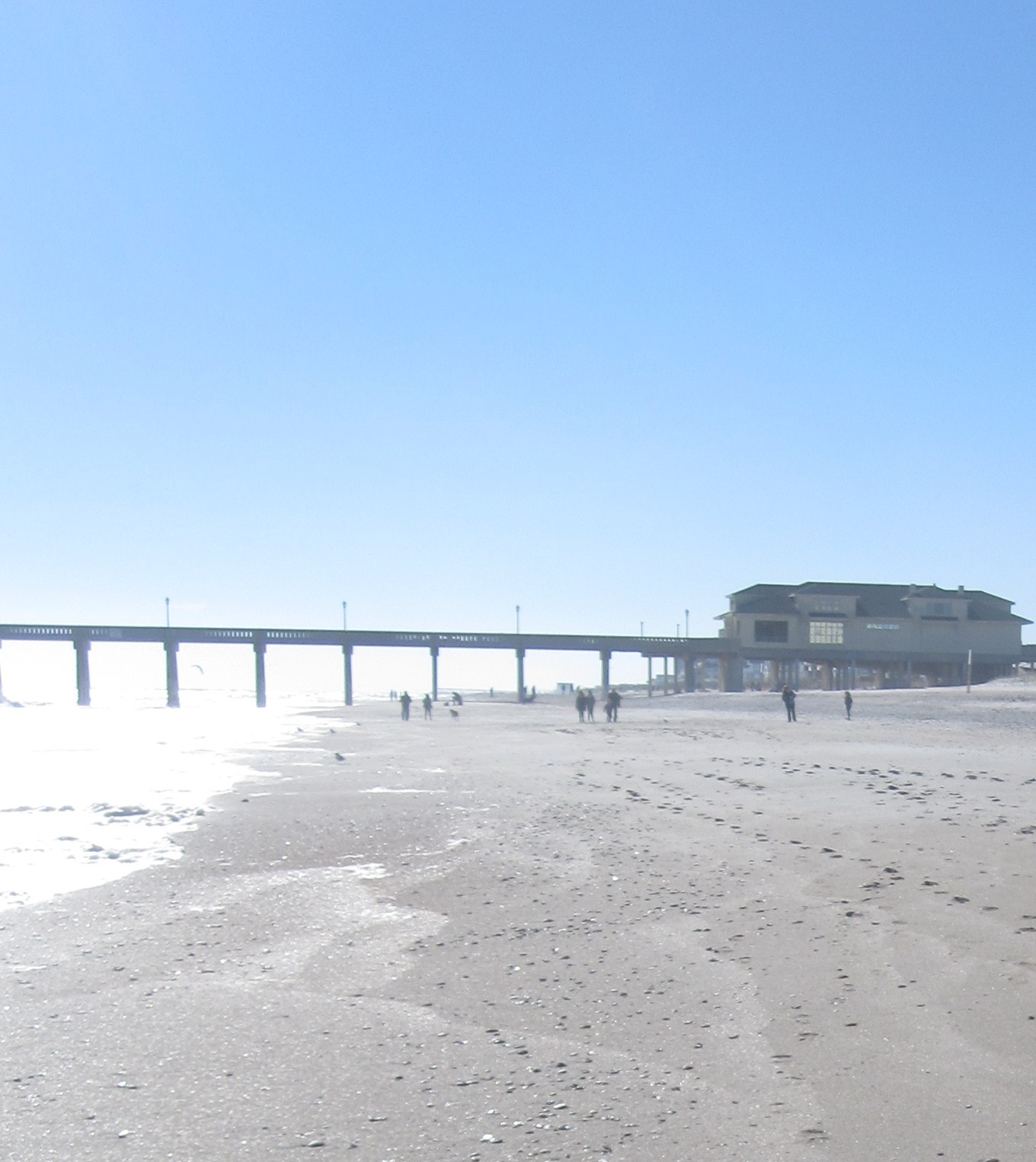
Johnnie Mercers Fishing Pier

In 1923 Shell Island was purchased by the Home Realty Company to build a resort for African Americans in the community. They built a pavilion, boardwalks, concessions, and bathhouses. Visitors could ride the streetcar to Harbor Island and board the ferry, taking them over to Shell Island. But in 1926, a massive fire burned every structure on the island. Never rebuilt, transportation to Shell Island also hence ceased.

In 1937 the third pier in North Carolina, the Ocean View Pier, was constructed. In 1939 it was bought by Johnnie Mercer and renamed after its new owner. Hurricanes have really taken a toll on the pier. It was hit by hurricanes Hazel, Connie, Bertha, and Fran. After Fran in 1996, the pier was so damaged that it was closed until 2002, reopening with a whole new look. The current Johnnie Mercer's Pier is made of reinforced concrete and still stands today with a gift shop, restaurant/ice cream bar, and various arcade machines. A second pier was constructed in 1938 by Floyd Cox and named the Mira Mar Fishing Pier. It was built on top of the wreck of the Fanny and Jenny, a Confederate blockade runner that ran aground during its maiden voyage in the Civil War in 1864. The wreckage created a natural reef, making for good fishing. Originally Mira Mar was 1,000 feet (300 m) long and boasted a bowling alley and restaurant. The pier was later bought and briefly renamed the Luna Fishing Pier and then the Crystal Fishing Pier.

The construction and popularity of these new buildings were made possible in part by constructing a highway and car bridge to the beach in 1935. A causeway from the mainland to Harbor Island was built in 1926. This allowed people to drive to the first part of the beach. The opening of a road all the way from the mainland to the beach, with a bridge over Banks Channel, allowed residents and visitors to access the town via road easily. On April 18, 1939, W.R. "Tuck" Savage, who had operated the first electric streetcar in Wilmington, also piloted the city's last one on a return trip to Wrightsville Beach.

== Storm activity ==
Wrightsville Beach has weathered many storms. Two devastating hurricanes hit in 1899. The first hurricane hit on August 17, making landfall at Hatteras with widespread destruction at Wrightsville Beach. The second storm came just south of Wrightsville Beach on November 1 at high tide. Many structures and buildings on the island were damaged. Cottages were wiped off the beach, the train trestle was damaged, and the Carolina Yacht Club had to be completely rebuilt. A few smaller storms hit in the early 1900s, but none did extensive damage.

The next big hit came in 1954 from Hurricane Hazel, which made landfall at Holden Beach. This was the third named hurricane to hit the area within seven weeks and is the only category 4 hurricane to make landfall in North Carolina. The storm headed up the coast devastating Yaupon Beach, Long Beach and Southport before hitting Carolina Beach and Wrightsville Beach. Hurricane Connie hit the beach in 1955 and caused damages to Johnnie Mercer's Pier and other houses along the beach.

In 1996, the area was hit by two hurricanes, Bertha and Fran, within months of each other. The storms destroyed the beaches' fishing piers and caused hundreds of thousands of dollars' worth of damage.

In 1999, the area was affected by Hurricane Dennis, which dumped heavy rains and recorded gusts up to 90–100 miles per hour (140–160 km/h) at Wrightsville and set up the catastrophic flooding disaster that would be the result of Hurricane Floyd's landfall nearby just weeks later.

Hurricane Florence made landfall in Wrightsville Beach in 2018 as a Category 1 storm with maximum 90 miles per hour (140 km/h) winds.

During Hurricane Isaias in August 2020, wave-driven water levels accounted for 52% of the total water level during the storm’s three highest-water-level hours. Researchers used observations and computer models to assess potential coastal change in the Wilmington forecast area, projecting dune erosion or overwash at 88% of monitored locations. Potential dune erosion was identified at 55 sites and overwash at 29 sites.

== Historic sites ==
- Myers Cottage (WBMOH)
- Ewing Bordeaux Cottage (Formerly, WBMOH)
- 645 South Lumina Avenue (Former Site of "Lumina")
- Moores Inlet Street (Former site of Moores Inlet).

== Geography ==
The area's geography is composed of two islands separated by two different bodies of water. The Intercoastal Waterway separates the Hammocks from the mainland ("Hammocks" currently known as Harbor Island). The Hammocks are then separated from the beach by Banks Channel. Wrightsville Beach lies south of Figure Eight Island, separated by Mason's Inlet, and north of Masonboro Island, separated by Masonboro Inlet.

According to the United States Census Bureau, the town has a total area of 2.4 square miles (6.2 km^{2}), of which 1.3 square miles (3.4 km^{2}) is land and 1.1 square miles (2.8 km^{2}) (44.40%) is water.

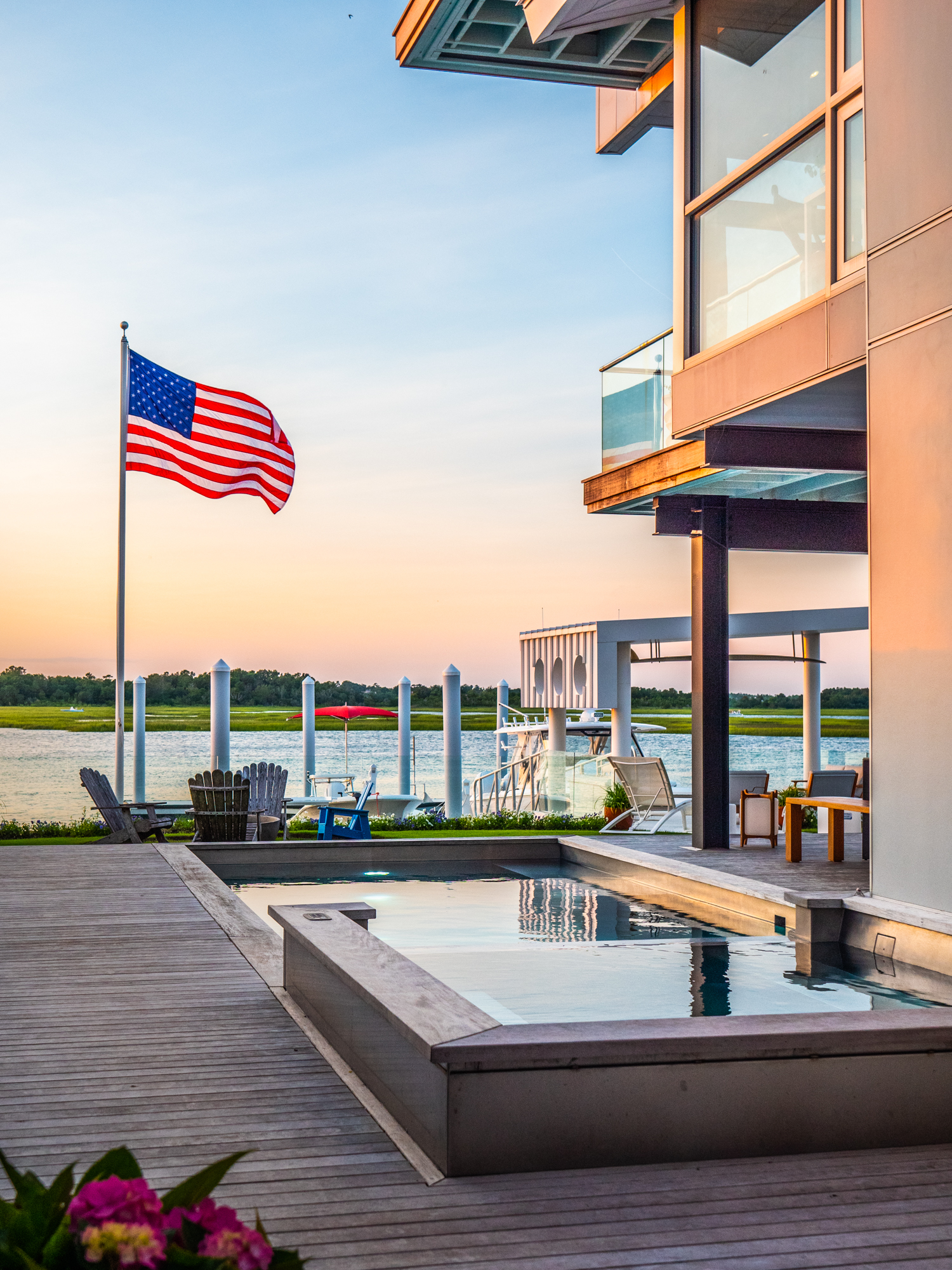
Contemporary home in Wrightsville Beach, North Carolina

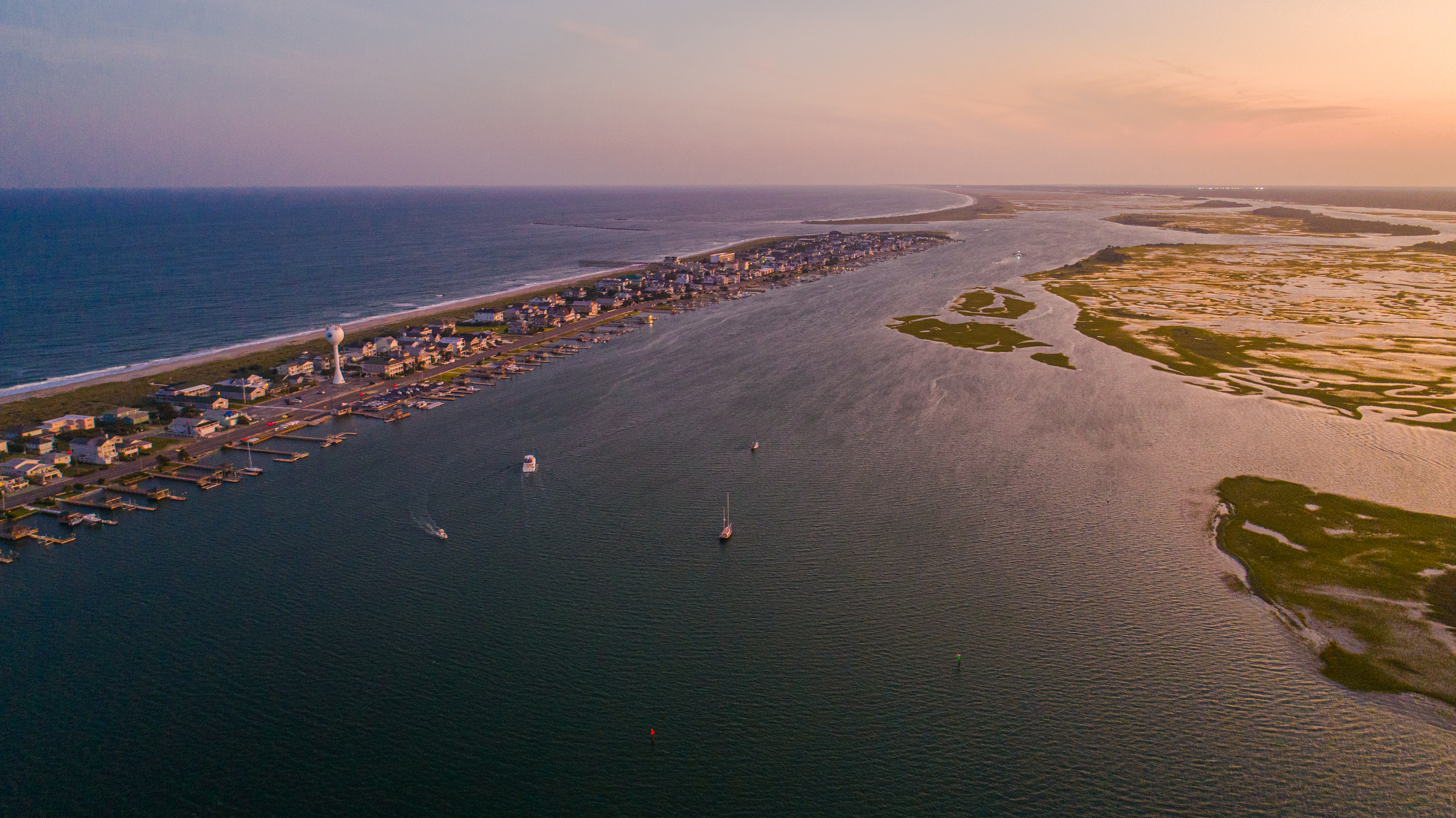
Aerial footage of the south end of Wrightsville Beach, North Carolina

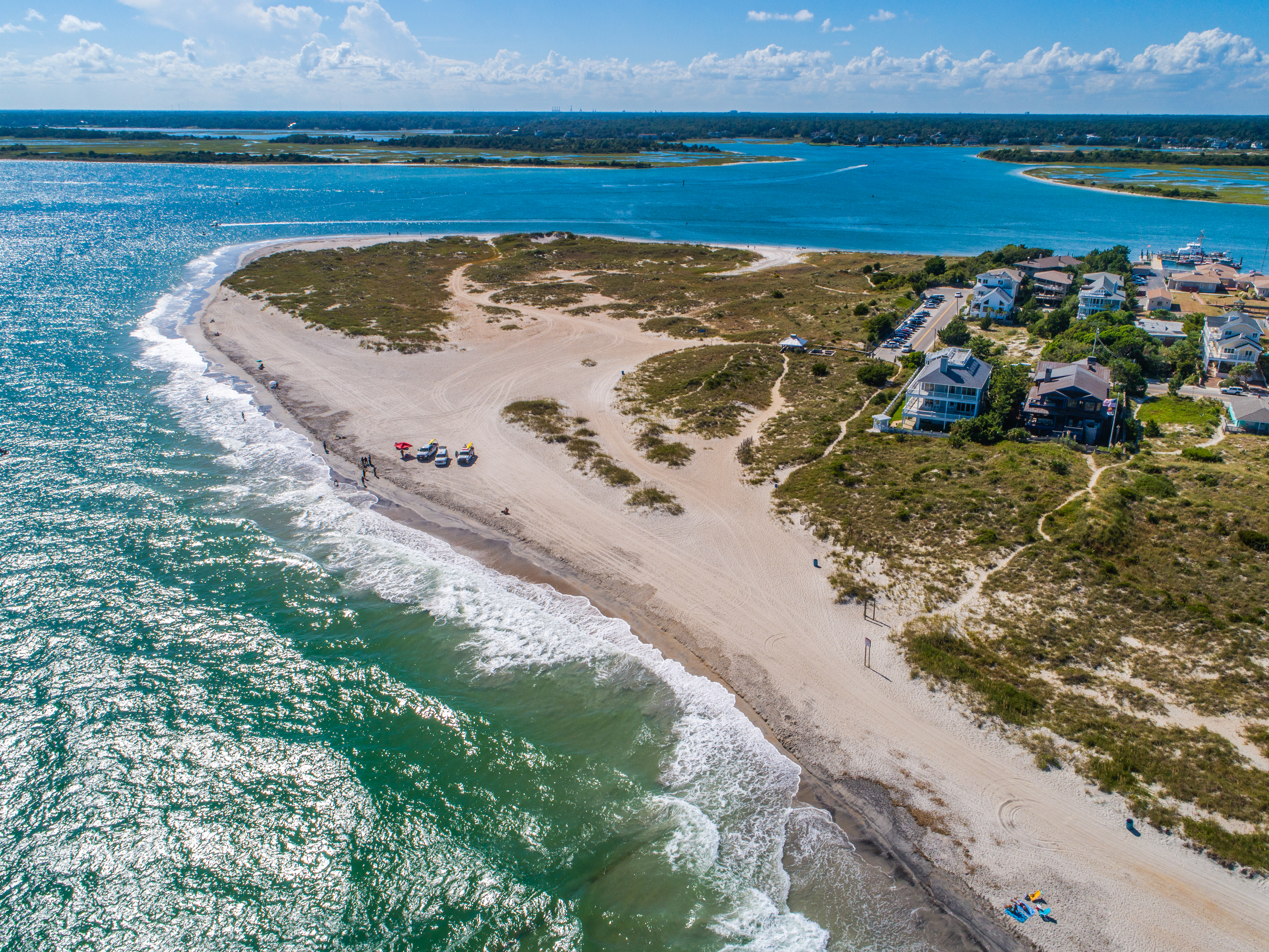
Wrightsville Beach South End

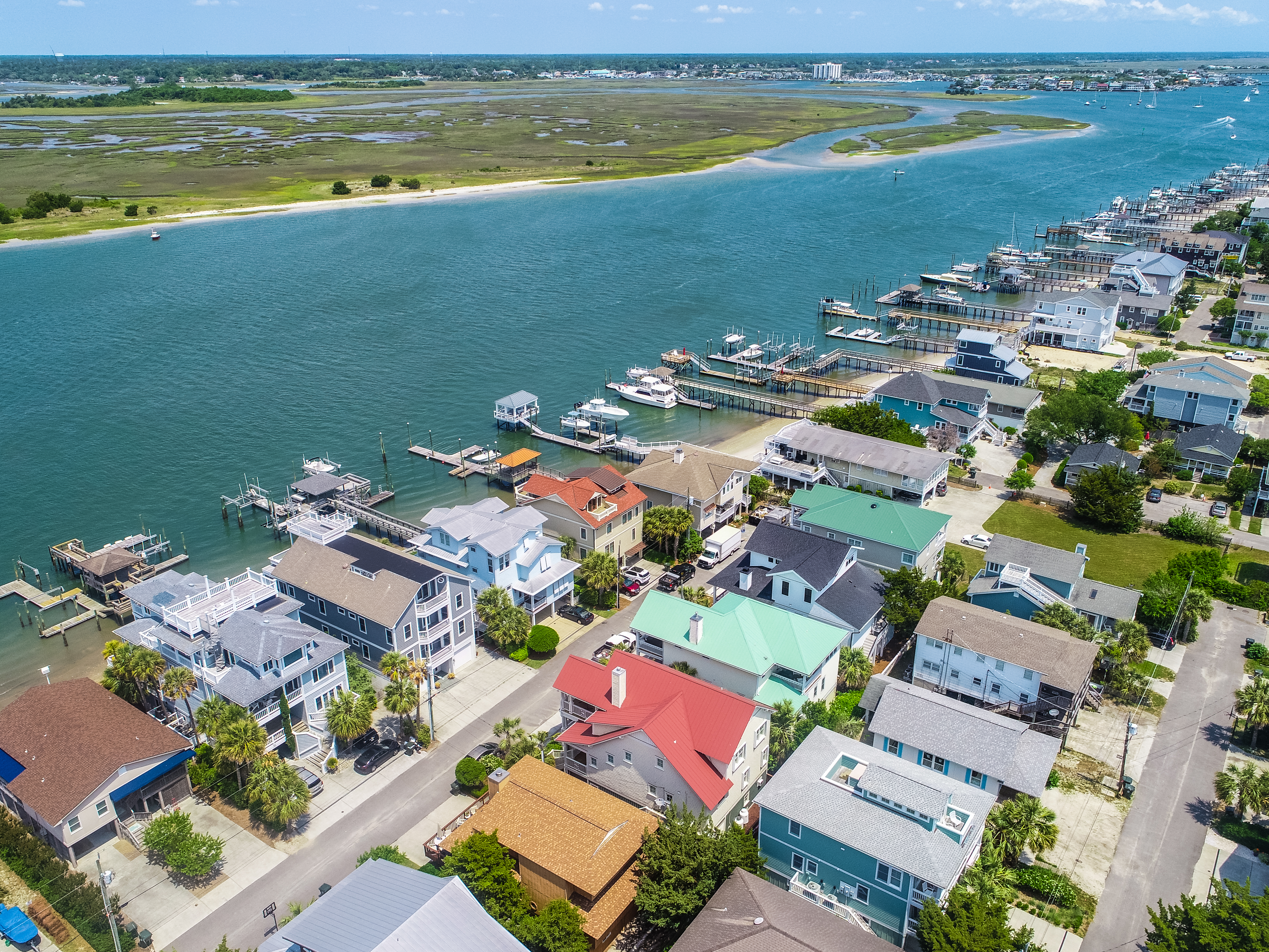
Wrightsville Beach Neighborhood

Wrightsville Beach has used beach nourishment to replace eroded sand; storms including Hurricanes Bonnie and Floyd removed much of the sand placed during the 1998 nourishment project. The study found that about two-thirds of the 1998 nourishment fill disappeared from the above-water beach during its first year.

== Climate ==
The climate in this area is characterized by hot, humid summers and generally mild to cool winters. According to the Köppen Climate Classification system, Wrightsville Beach has a humid subtropical climate, abbreviated "Cfa" on climate maps. It has a USDA hardiness zone of 8b.

Climate data for Wrightsville Beach
Month	Jan	Feb	Mar	Apr	May	Jun	Jul	Aug	Sep	Oct	Nov	Dec	Year
Mean daily maximum °F (°C)	55.3 (12.9)	57.6 (14.2)	63.6 (17.6)	71.0 (21.7)	77.8 (25.4)	83.9 (28.8)	87.1 (30.6)	86.1 (30.1)	82.2 (27.9)	74.6 (23.7)	65.8 (18.8)	58.5 (14.7)	72 (22)
Mean daily minimum °F (°C)	36.8 (2.7)	38.6 (3.7)	44.5 (6.9)	53.5 (11.9)	62.2 (16.8)	70.3 (21.3)	74.0 (23.3)	72.4 (22.4)	67.7 (19.8)	56.7 (13.7)	45.9 (7.7)	39.7 (4.3)	55.2 (12.9)
Average precipitation inches (mm)	3.91 (99)	3.60 (91)	4.02 (102)	3.54 (90)	4.24 (108)	5.07 (129)	6.97 (177)	7.66 (195)	9.21 (234)	5.02 (128)	3.81 (97)	3.98 (101)	61.03 (1,550)
Source: PRISM

== Demographics ==
Historical population
Census	Pop.	Note	%±
1900	22		—
1910	54		145.5%
1920	20		−63.0%
1930	109		445.0%
1940	252		131.2%
1950	711		182.1%
1960	723		1.7%
1970	1,701		135.3%
1980	2,910		71.1%
1990	2,937		0.9%
2000	2,593		−11.7%
2010	2,477		−4.5%
2020	2,473		−0.2%
U.S. Decennial Census

=== 2020 census ===
As of the 2020 census, Wrightsville Beach had a population of 2,473. The median age was 46.0 years. 14.1% of residents were under the age of 18 and 21.0% of residents were 65 years of age or older. For every 100 females there were 105.4 males, and for every 100 females age 18 and over there were 102.4 males age 18 and over.

100.0% of residents lived in urban areas, while 0.0% lived in rural areas.

There were 1,180 households in Wrightsville Beach, of which 19.0% had children under the age of 18 living in them. Of all households, 41.9% were married-couple households, 26.4% were households with a male householder and no spouse or partner present, and 24.7% were households with a female householder and no spouse or partner present. About 35.0% of all households were made up of individuals and 12.8% had someone living alone who was 65 years of age or older.

There were 531 families residing in the town.

There were 2,819 housing units, of which 58.1% were vacant. The homeowner vacancy rate was 2.1% and the rental vacancy rate was 35.9%.

Wrightsville Beach racial composition
Race	Number	Percentage
White (non-Hispanic)	2,322	93.89%
Black or African American (non-Hispanic)	11	0.44%
Asian	15	0.61%
Pacific Islander	1	0.04%
Other/Mixed	89	3.6%
Hispanic or Latino	35	1.42%

=== Population information ===
Per the United States Census Bureau, the town covers 1.4 square miles, giving a population density of about 1,921 people per square mile. Compared to the Wilmington metro area, the town has a higher median age of 56.1 years. The population is 56 percent male, and most residents are White at 94 percent. Black or African American residents make up 1 percent, and people identifying with two or more races make up 4 percent.

=== Households and Housing ===
The average household size is 2.1 people. About 81 percent of homes are owner-occupied, with around 62.8 percent of homeowners having a mortgage. The median value of an owner-occupied home is $1,041,800. Most residents are long-term, including retirees, along with some newer people moving in each year.

=== Economy and Employment ===
Economically, Wrightsville Beach is a well-off community. The per capita income is $97,190, and the median household income is $167,273. Around 3.6 percent of residents live below the poverty line. The average commute to work is 17.3 minutes, shorter than the Wilmington metro average of 23.6 minutes.. Employment grew 3.04 percent between February 2022 and February 2023. The local economy is supported by tourism during the summer and service jobs.

== Local events and festivals ==
Wrightsville Beach and the surrounding area host a variety of events that bring the community together throughout the year. The town hosts the annual North Carolina Holiday Flotilla, where boaters decorate their vessels with Christmas lights and creative holiday themes. The event, held for over forty years, draws participants from across the region and celebrates the memory of longtime participant Billy Baggett. The flotilla is a festive gathering that brings residents together and features a friendly contest for the most impressive displays.

Enchanted Airlie is a popular holiday event held at the historic Airlie Gardens, featuring elaborate light displays. The event serves as the gardens’ largest fundraiser of the year, supporting projects like the stormwater master plan and environmental improvements in the Bradley Creek watershed. Beyond the lights, it highlights the garden’s role in conservation and community engagement while drawing visitors from across the region.

The Wrightsville Beach Farmers Market began in June 2009 and offers residents and visitors the chance to buy fresh, locally grown produce. In addition to food vendors, the market features craft vendors, creating a community atmosphere that supports local growers and artisans. The market serves as a social gathering space while promoting quality of life in the town.

On top of these, Wrightsville Beach hosts many more events and can be found on the Wrightsville Beach events website.

Preceded by Figure Eight Island	Beaches of Southeastern North Carolina	Succeeded by Masonboro Island
