= Masonboro Island =

Island in North Carolina, United States of America

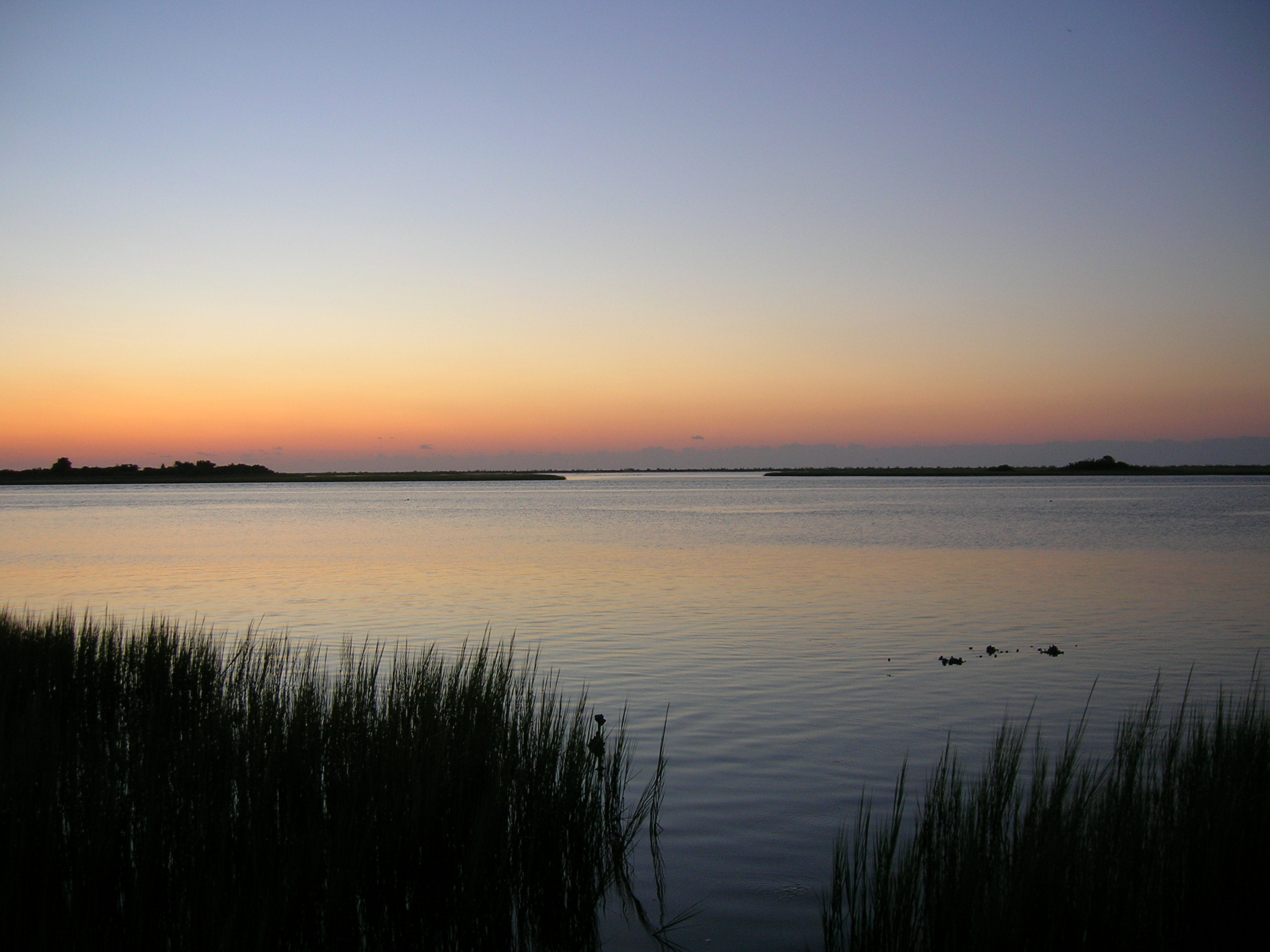
- Masonboro Island as seen from the mainland
- Interactive map of Masonboro Island

Geography
- Location: Masonboro Township / Federal Point Township, New Hanover County
- Coordinates: 34°07′32″N 77°51′29″W
- Area: 0.721 km^{2} (0.278 sq mi)
- Highest point

Administration
- United States
- State: North Carolina

Masonboro Island is a barrier island in New Hanover County, North Carolina, United States. The island, being undeveloped and only accessible by boat, is a constituent of the North Carolina National Estuarine Research Reserve and a North Carolina State Natural Area. It lies south of Wrightsville Beach, separated by Masonboro Inlet, and north of Carolina Beach, separated by Carolina Beach Inlet. The island is a popular local destination for recreational activities like boating, surfing, fishing, and camping.

Masonboro Island is a mix of marshes, dunes and tidal flats, with beaches along its Atlantic coastline and a chain of small hills and wetland islands along Masonboro Sound, which is part of the Intracoastal Waterway. The beaches are a nesting ground for loggerheads and green sea turtles, and the waters on the sound side of the island are a nursery for spot, mullet, flounder and pompano.

== Ecology and geography ==
Masonboro Island is a research site sanctioned in the North Carolina National Estuarine Research Reserve. A study of water-quality data gathered between 2002-2021 found long-term changes in the concentrations of nutrients and other reserve water-quality measurements. Decreases in orthophosphate and ammonium concentrations corresponded with improvements to stormwater and sewage facilities in nearby watersheds. The study also found an increase in chlorophyll concentrations and cited periods of low salinity and hypoxia after Hurricane Florence (2018.)

== Environmental research ==
The estuarine waters near Masonboro Island provide a habitat for juvenile fish. Research conducted at five sites near the island assessed the quality of the habitats for juvenile summer flounder by measuring fish mortality and growth alongside environmental conditions such as dissolved oxygen, pH, and salinity. The study discovered differences in growth and mortality at the locations, with an indication of differences in the quality of habitats near Masonboro Island.

| Preceded by Wrightsville Beach | Beaches of Southeastern North Carolina | Succeeded by Carolina Beach |
