= Research site =

CHALLENGES of MATHEMATICS LEARNING In joining extracurricular activities

== Clinical research ==
In clinical research a research site conducts all or part of a clinical trial. For clinical trials which recruit research participants in multiple locations, often the research will have a headquarters then multiple regional research sites to conduct the research in that region. In a network of research sites where all are recruiting study participants, sites with low recruitment benefit from coaching from sites with high recruitment.

Characteristics of good clinical research sites include setting good timelines, early participant recruitment, and having a management plan for efficiency.

Researchers in nursing have reported challenges accessing the facilities designated for conventional medical research.

The design of a research site should have a means of detecting fraud.

== Ethnographic research ==
Researchers who do not have a cultural tie to a research population may have difficulty doing ethnographic research with that community.
