= Currituck Banks North Carolina National Estuarine Research Reserve =

Protected area in North Carolina, U.S.

Coordinates: 36.391756°N 75.834374°W

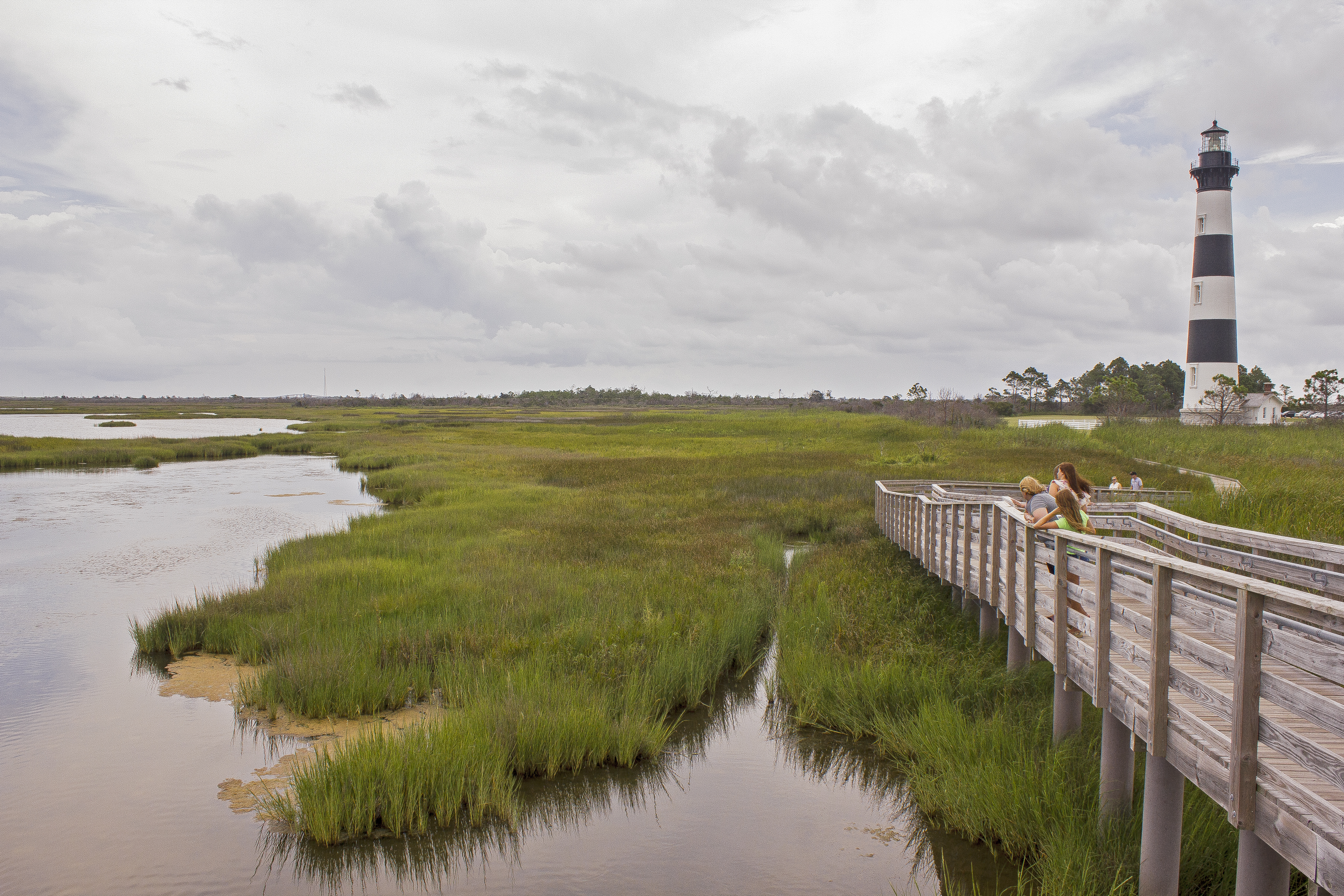
Bodie Island

Currituck Banks North Carolina National Estuarine Research Reserve is a component site of the North Carolina National Estuarine Research Reserve on the Currituck Banks, north of Corolla, North Carolina. Currituck Banks is one of three original National Estuarine Research Reserve sites dedicated by NOAA in 1985. The reserve encompasses 965 acres of varied habitat and is bordered by the Currituck Sound. The Currituck banks are part of a 70-mile long barrier spit that extends from Virginia Beach to Oregon Inlet.

== Description ==
The reserve is an example of a low-salinity estuarine ecosystem and contains a variety of habitats, including beach, sand dunes, grasslands, shrub thicket, maritime forest, brackish and freshwater marshes, tidal flats, and subtidal soft bottoms.

The reserve was described in the Boston Globe as being among the coast's most beautiful nature preserves; the review noted that the reserve and surrounding area are nearly empty of people during the off-season.

== Fauna ==
The reserve is home to a wealth of birds and fish, including commercial and game fish species. The reserve allows hunting (with a registration form required), and is also listed as an eBird hotspot for birdwatching. Mammals include white-tailed deer, eastern gray squirrel, cottontail and marsh rabbit, opossum, raccoon, gray fox, bobcat, muskrat, river otter, and the invasive nutria. The uniquely brackish water allows both salt water and freshwater species of fish to thrive here. Saltwater fish species include speckled trout, flounder, red drum, mullet and striped bass. Freshwater fish species include largemouth bass, sunfish, crappie, and perch.

Bird species list
Common name
Snow Goose
Canada Goose
Mute Swan
Tundra Swan
Wood Duck
Gadwall
Mallard
American Black Duck
Green-winged Teal
White-winged Scoter
Black Scoter
Bufflehead
Common Merganser
Red-breasted Merganser
Ruddy Duck
Pied-billed Grebe
Rock Pigeon
Mourning Dove
Yellow-billed Cuckoo
Chuck-will's-widow
Chimney Swift
Ruby-throated Hummingbird
King Rail
Clapper Rail
Virginia Rail
American Coot
Black-bellied Plover
Semipalmated Plover
Killdeer
Marbled Godwit
Ruddy Turnstone
Red Knot
Stilt Sandpiper
Sanderling
Semipalmated Sandpiper
Western Sandpiper
Short-billed Dowitcher
Long-billed Dowitcher
American Woodcock
Solitary Sandpiper
Greater Yellowlegs
Willet
Lesser Yellowlegs
Parasitic Jaeger
Bonaparte's Gull
Black-headed Gull
Laughing Gull
Lesser Black-backed Gull
Herring Gull
Great Black-backed Gull
Least Tern
Caspian Tern
Common Tern
Forster's Tern
Royal Tern
Sandwich Tern
Common Loon
Magnificent Frigatebird
Northern Gannet
Double-crested Cormorant
American White Pelican
Brown Pelican
American Bittern
Least Bittern
Great Blue Heron
Great Egret
Snowy Egret
Little Blue Heron
Tricolored Heron
Cattle Egret
Green Heron
Black-crowned Night-Heron
Glossy Ibis
Black Vulture
Turkey Vulture
Osprey
Northern Harrier
Sharp-shinned Hawk
Cooper's Hawk
Bald Eagle
Red-shouldered Hawk
Red-tailed Hawk
Eastern Screech-Owl
Great Horned Owl
Barred Owl
Belted Kingfisher
Gray Catbird
Brown Thrasher
Northern Mockingbird
European Starling
Cedar Waxwing
House Finch
Purple Finch
Pine Siskin
American Goldfinch
Chipping Sparrow
Fox Sparrow
Dark-eyed Junco
White-throated Sparrow
Seaside Sparrow
Saltmarsh Sparrow
Song Sparrow
Swamp Sparrow
Eastern Towhee
Orchard Oriole
Red-winged Blackbird
Brown-headed Cowbird
Common Grackle
Boat-tailed Grackle
Ovenbird
Black-and-white Warbler
Prothonotary Warbler
Swainson's Warbler
Orange-crowned Warbler
Common Yellowthroat
American Redstart
Northern Parula
Magnolia Warbler
Chestnut-sided Warbler
Blackpoll Warbler
Black-throated Blue Warbler
Palm Warbler
Pine Warbler
Yellow-rumped Warbler
Yellow-throated Warbler
Prairie Warbler
Black-throated Green Warbler
Summer Tanager
Northern Cardinal
Rose-breasted Grosbeak
Blue Grosbeak
Indigo Bunting
House Sparrow
