= Grayson Highlands State Park =

State park in Virginia, United States

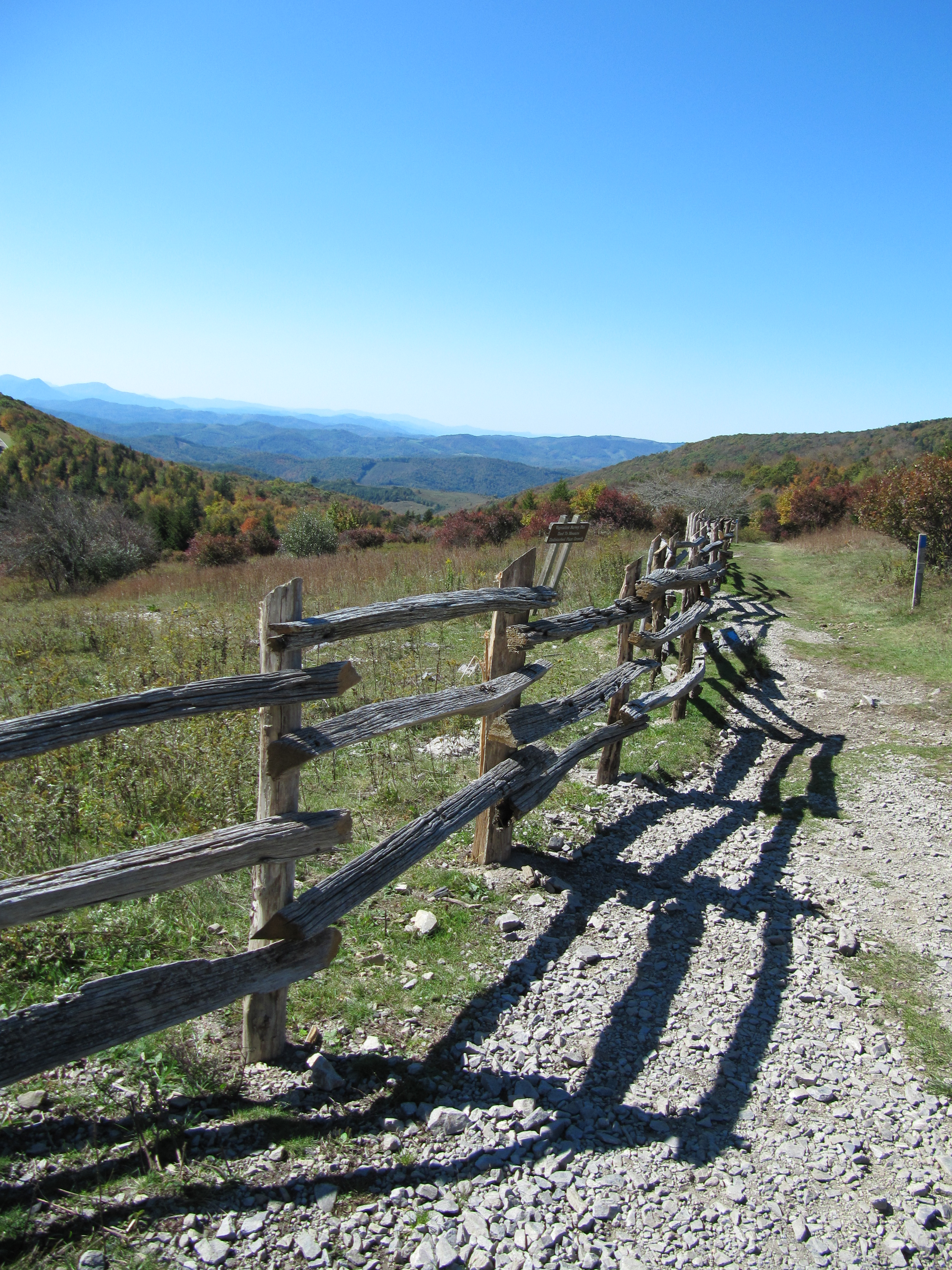
- Along Highland Trail

- Location within Virginia Location within the United States
- Location: Grayson County, Virginia
- Coordinates: 36°37′45″N 81°30′52″W
- Area: 4,502 acres (1,822 ha)
- Established: 1965
- Governing body: Virginia Department of Conservation and Recreation
- Website: Grayson Highlands State Park

U.S. National Natural Landmark
- Designated: 1974

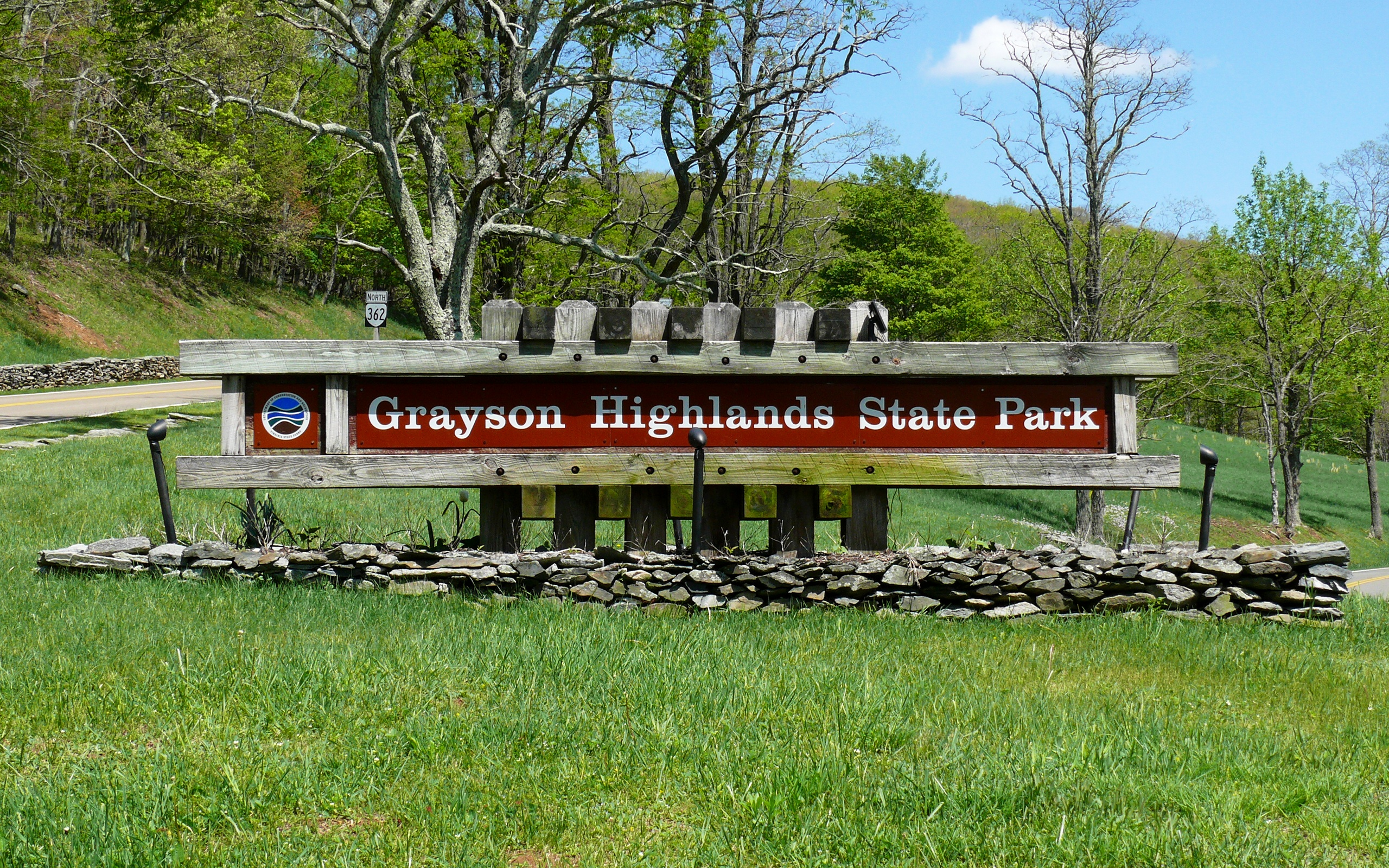
Grayson Highlands State Park.

Grayson Highlands State Park is a state park located in Grayson County, Virginia, United States. It is adjacent to the Mount Rogers National Recreation Area and lies within the Jefferson National Forest. The park was established in 1965 and contains a total of 4,502 acres (1,822 ha). The park hosts a number of outdoor activities including hiking, camping, mountainbiking, horseback riding, and backpacking. A 2.8 mile (4.5 km) portion of the Appalachian Trail runs through the park in addition to a number of other hiking and horseback riding trails. The state park is musically notable as the home for the Grayson Highlands Fall Festival as well as weekly jam sessions by local folk musicians, who draw upon the traditional styles of the Blue Ridge area. The park is also home to the Wayne C. Henderson Festival and Guitar Competition, a regionally important festival and guitarist contest named for local notable guitar-maker Wayne Henderson.

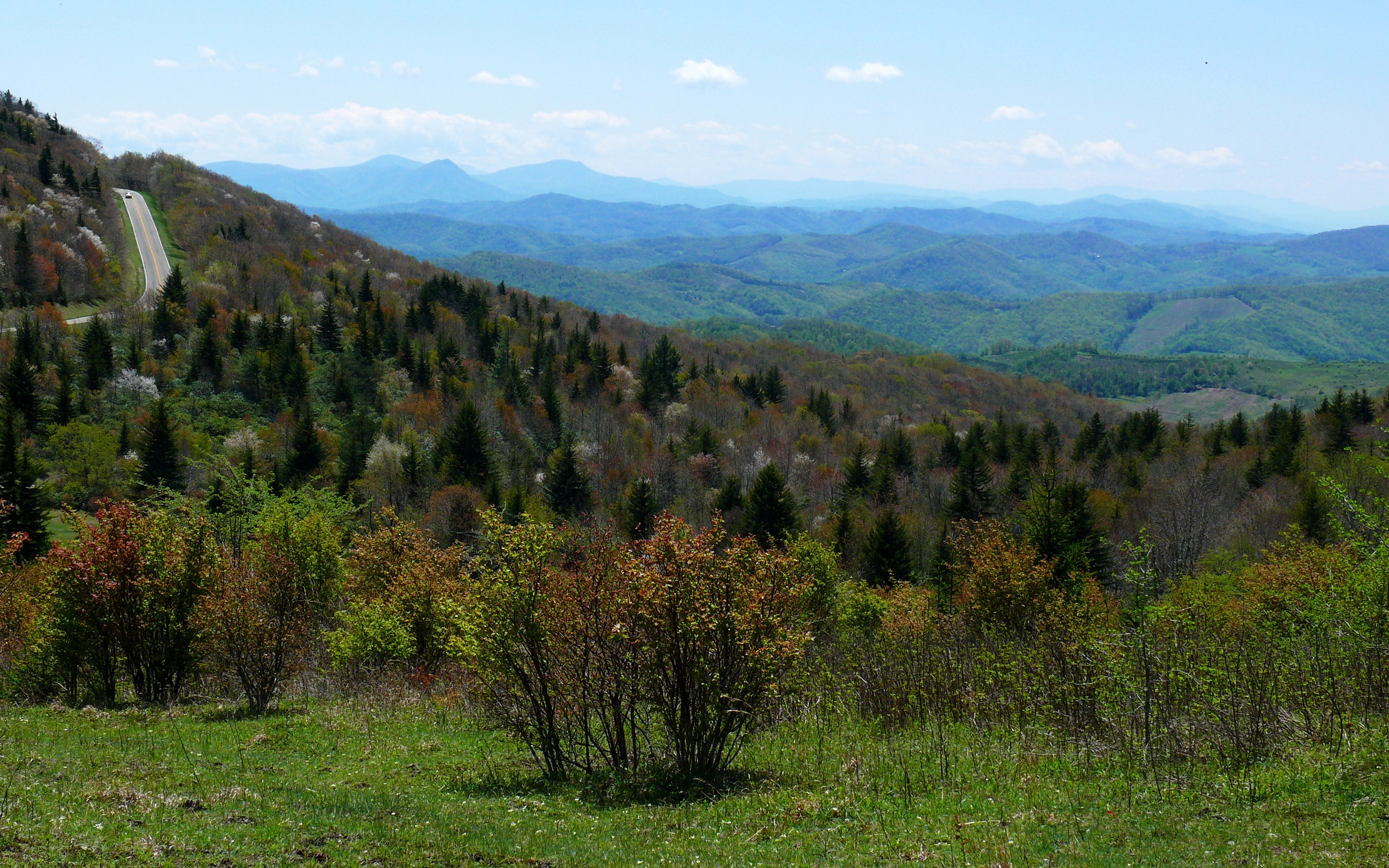
Looking west from Massie Gap.

The park also has a campground cabin store with candies and ice cream inside.

The park hosts forests like those on nearby Mount Rogers, as well as a number of mountain meadows or balds. These meadows provide excellent views of the surrounding area and present a striking change in scenery from the surrounding forests. The balds are dominated by large rocky outcroppings clear of vegetation excepting the occasional windswept tree and low grasses.

== Ponies ==
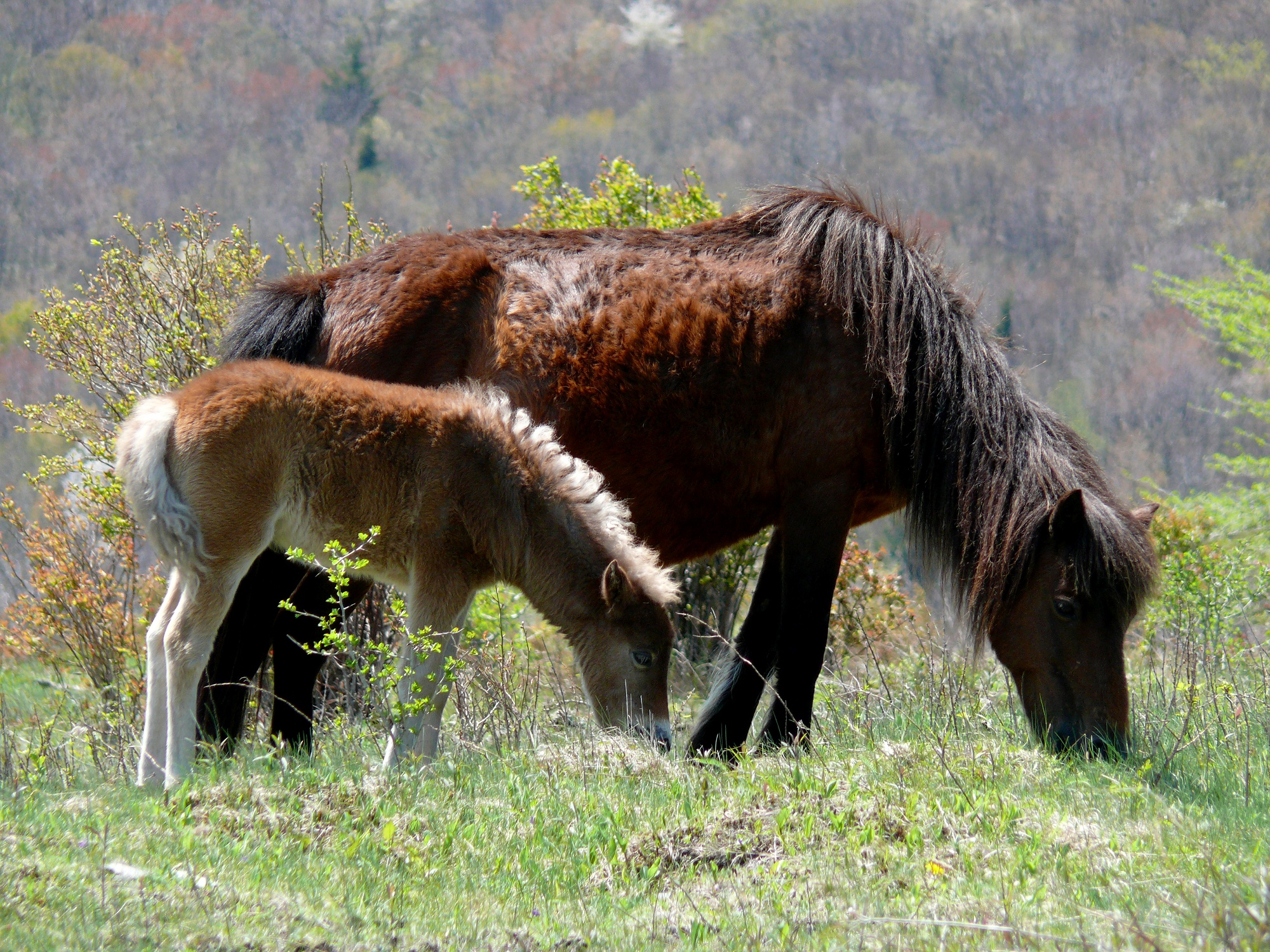
A mare and her foal on Wilburn Ridge.

The balds are inhabited by a herd of ponies introduced in the 1970s and allowed to run wild within the confines of the park. The ponies are very accustomed to humans and rarely halt their grazing as hikers pass close by. Many locals touch and feed the ponies, though this practice is frowned upon by non-locals and against park policy. Each year, park officials round up the herd and check for health problems in addition to reducing the herd size if necessary; the excess colts are sold at auction.

== Festivals ==
The Wayne C. Henderson Music Festival and Guitar Competition is held at the park every June. The festival, named for local musician and luthier Wayne C. Henderson, features old time music and bluegrass music.

The Grayson Highlands Fall Festival is an annual event held at the park during the fall. The festival hosts a variety of entertainment including live bluegrass and traditional music, molasses making, and demonstrations focusing on pioneer-living. The festival is also home to a local crafts fair and auctions for the selling of excess colts from the "wild" pony herd managed by the Wilburn Ridge Pony Association.

== Trails ==
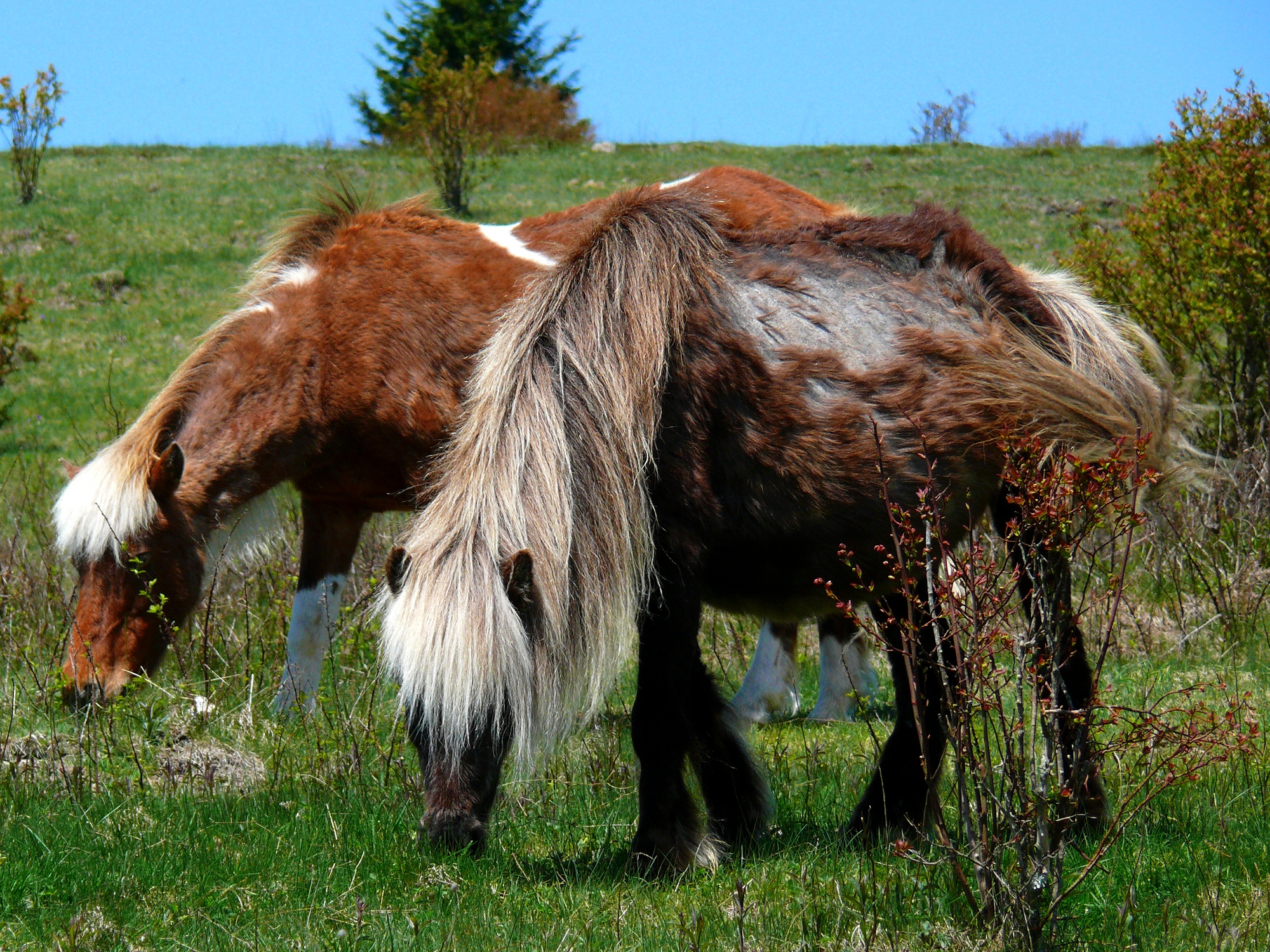
Wild ponies on Wilburn Ridge.

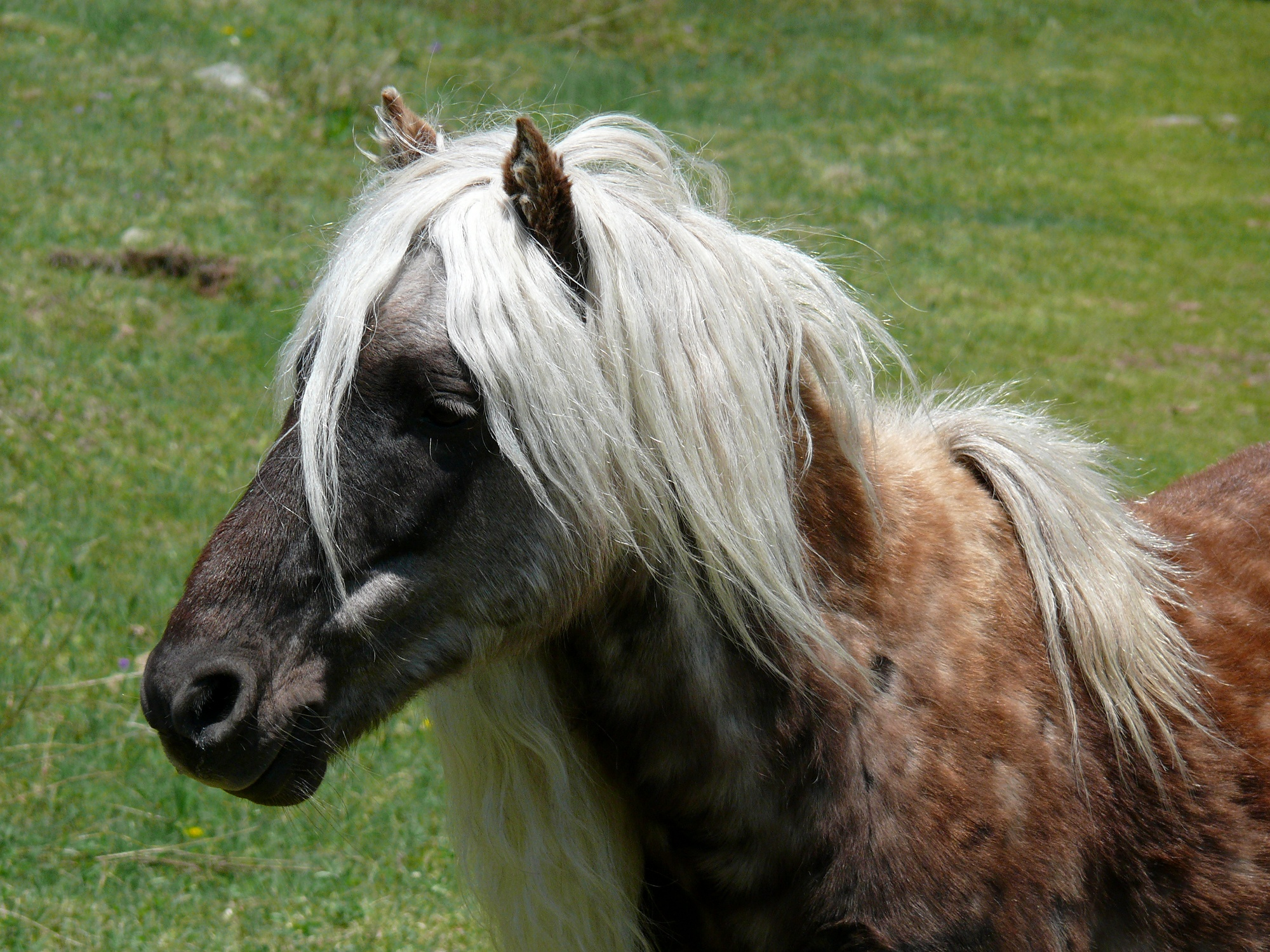
A stallion on Wilburn Ridge.

=== Hiking trails ===
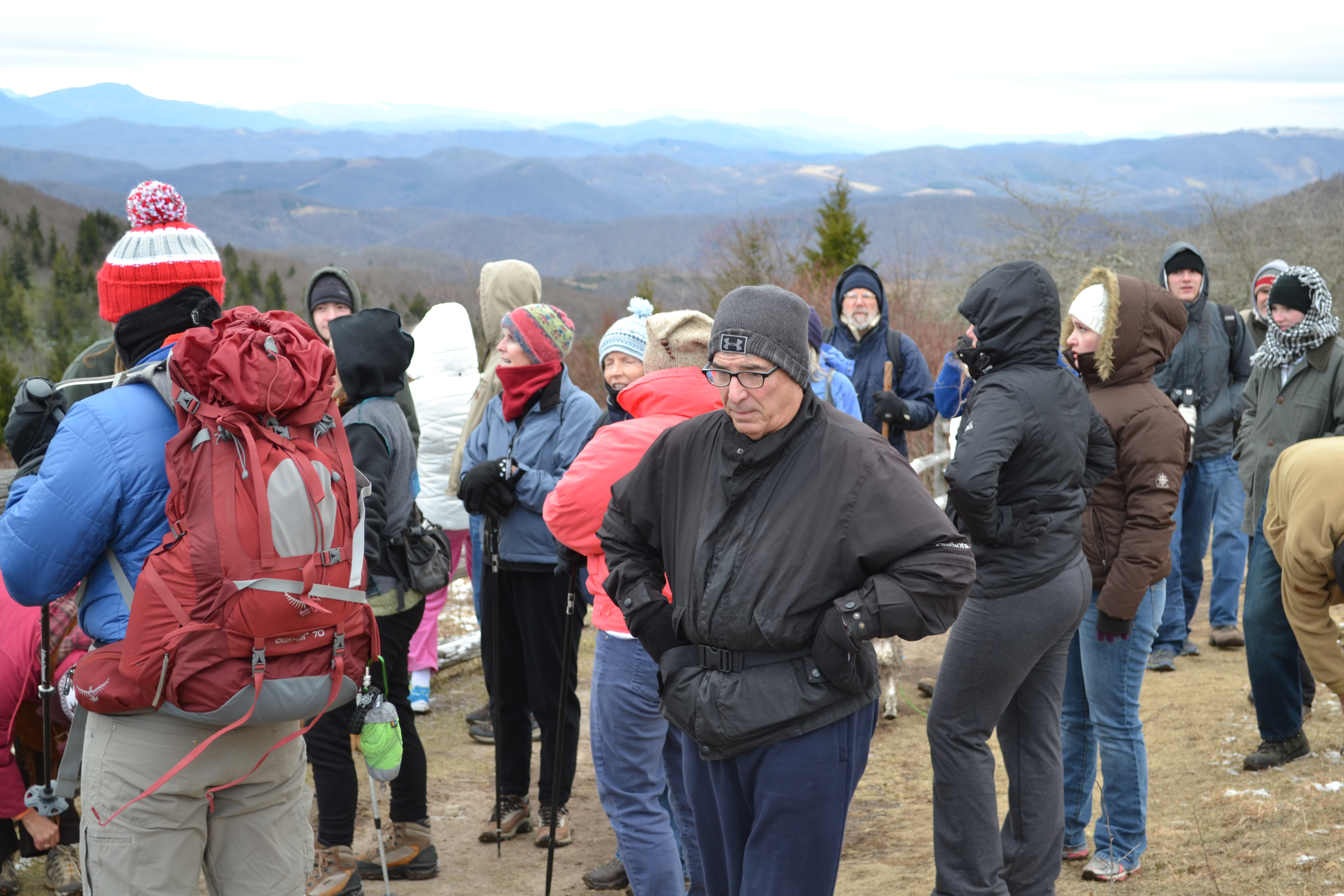
Participants in a First Day Hike at the park in 2015

- Rhododendron Trail: 1.0 mile (1.6 km)
- Cabin Creek Trail: 1.9 miles (3.1 km) loop
- Big Pinnacle Trail: 0.4 mile (0.6 km)
- Twin Pinnacles Trail: 1.6 miles (2.6 km)
- Listening Rock Trail: 2.0 mile (3.2 km) loop
- Wilson Creek Trail: 1.8 miles (2.9 km)
- Stampers Branch Trail: 2.0 miles (3.2 km)
- Rock House Ridge Trail: 1.2 miles (1.9 km) loop
- Appalachian Trail: 2.8 miles (4.5 km)
- Horse Trail (east): 1.7 miles (2.7 km)
- Horse Trail (north): 1.0 mile (1.6 km)
- Seed Orchard Road: 1.3 miles (2.1 km)
- Old Upchurch Road: 3.7 (6.0 km)
- Service Road: 0.5 mile (0.8 km)
- Appalachian Spur Trail: 0.75 mile (1.2 km)
- Wilburn Branch Trail: 0.8 mile (1.3 km)

=== Horseback riding trails ===
- Horse Trail (east): 1.7 miles (2.7 km)
- Horse Trail (north): 1.0 mile (1.6 km)
- Seed Orchard Road: 1.3 miles (2.1 km)
- Old Upchurch Road: 3.7 miles (6.0 km)

== Nearby state parks ==
The following state parks are within 30 miles (48 km) of Grayson Highlands State Park:

Elk Knob State Park, North Carolina
Hungry Mother State Park
New River State Park, North Carolina
New River Trail State Park
Mount Jefferson State Natural Area, North Carolina
Rendezvous Mountain State Park, North Carolina
Stone Mountain State Park, North Carolina

== See also ==
- List of Virginia State Parks
- Mount Rogers Cluster
