= List of National Natural Landmarks in North Carolina =

There are 13 National Natural Landmarks in North Carolina.

North Carolina National Natural Landmarks (clickable map)

Name	Image	Date	Location	County	Ownership	Description
Bear Island	Bear Island	1980	34.631944°N 77.145556°W	Onslow	state	Dune movement has created a dynamic landscape of outstanding scenic beauty. Bear Island is the principal attraction of Hammocks Beach State Park.
Goose Creek State Park Natural Area	Goose Creek State Park	1980	35.473611°N 76.913889°W	Beaufort	state	An excellent example of a gently sloping mainland undergoing rapid ocean transgression.
Green Swamp		1974	34.09321°N 78.29925°W	Brunswick	private	The largest and most unusual mosaic of wetland communities in the Carolinas. The Nature Conservancy manages the site as the Green Swamp Preserve.
Long Hope Creek Spruce Bog		1974	36.381101°N 81.645663°W	Ashe, Watauga	private	One of the rarest plant communities in North Carolina. The still forming Elk Knob State Park is adjacent to the privately owned NNL, and the state has a long-term goal to acquire the site.
Mount Jefferson State Park	View from a Mount Jefferson overlook	1974	36.400833°N 81.462778°W	Ashe	state	One of the best remaining examples of oak-chestnut forest in the Southeast. The State Park was redesignated a State Natural Area.
Mount Mitchell State Park	View from Mount Mitchell	1974	35.770278°N 82.263333°W	Yancey	state	Mount Mitchell is the highest mountain in the eastern half of the United States at 6,684 feet (2,037 m).
Nags Head Woods and Jockey Ridge		1974	35.961944°N 75.634167°W	Dare	state	Illustrates the entire series of dune development and plant succession. Jockey's Ridge State Park encompasses the southern portion of the NNL, and The Nature Conservancy's Nags Head Woods Ecological Preserve encompasses the northern portion.
Orbicular Diorite		1980		Davie	private	Site contains an unusual plutonic igneous rock consisting of hornblende, pyroxene, and feldspars.
Piedmont Beech Natural Area		1974	35.853889°N 78.742778°W	Wake	state	One of the best examples of mixed mesophytic forest in the eastern Piedmont of North Carolina. The natural area is located within William B. Umstead State Park.
Pilot Mountain	Pilot Mountain Knob	1974	36.340138°N 80.474224°W	Surry	state	A classic monadnock that harbors disjunct vegetation from the Blue Ridge region. It is a core component of the greater Pilot Mountain State Park.
Salyer's Ridge Natural Area		1983		Hyde	federal	A rare example of mature loblolly pine forest in process of succession towards a deciduous forest. The natural area is located within the Mattamuskeet National Wildlife Refuge.
Smith Island		1967		Brunswick, New Hanover	state	A barrier island complex representing one of the least disturbed areas remaining on the Atlantic Coast. The island complex is protected as part of Fort Fisher State Recreation Area and Baldhead Island State Natural Area.
Stone Mountain	Stone Mountain	1974	36.393611°N 81.043333°W	Alleghany, Wilkes	state	The best example of a monadnock in North Carolina. It is the principal attraction of Stone Mountain State Park.

== See also ==
- List of National Historic Landmarks in North Carolina
