= Northern Peaks State Trail =

State trail in North Carolina, US

Northern Peaks Trail
- Length: 0 miles (0 km)
- Location: North Carolina, United States
- Established: 2019; 7 years ago
- Designation: State Trail (North Carolina)
- Use: Hiking
- Season: Year-round
- Sights: Boone, Howard Knob, Rich Mountain Bald, Snake Mountain, Elk Knob, Three Top Mountain, West Jefferson and Mount Jefferson
- Surface: Natural
- Maintained by: North Carolina Division of Parks and Recreation
- Website: https://trails.nc.gov/state-trails/northern-peaks-state-trail

The Northern Peaks State Trail is a unit of the North Carolina state park system in Ashe and Watauga Counties, North Carolina in the United States. The State Trail is planned as a hiking trail connecting Downtown Boone, Howard Knob County Park, Elk Knob State Park, Three Top Mountain Gameland, Downtown West Jefferson and Mount Jefferson State Natural Area. The trail is a collaboration between local governments and the state, with development coordinated by the North Carolina Division of Parks and Recreation (NCDPR).

== History ==
In 2008, NCDPR along with the High Country Council of Governments developed a regional trail plan for North Carolina's High Country. A potential trail route along the Northwestern Peaks of the state was identified in the plan.

In 2011, the Watauga County Tourism Development Authority published the Boone Area Outdoor Recreation Plan, which included a proposal for a Northern Peaks Trail.

In 2017, NCDPR, the Watauga County Tourism Development Authority, Ashe County, the Ashe County Chamber of Commerce, the West Jefferson Tourism Development Authority, the Town of Boone, and High Country Pathways, Inc jointly commissioned a master plan for the Northern Peaks Trail. The master plan concluded the trail was eligible for state trail status and proposed its designation as part of the State Trail System.

On July 1, 2019, the North Carolina General Assembly formalized the proposal by establishing Northern Peaks State Trail, and directed NCDPR to coordinate its development.

== Controversy ==
The plan for the Northern Peaks Trail has alarmed conservationists due to the presence of rare plants in high elevation zones of the peaks. The unique qualities of the soils of the Amphibolite Mountains and the secluded nature of the peaks has resulted in endemic species which cannot be found anywhere else. The current plan for the trail routes users through sensitive habitat, and does not include any proactive measures for resource protection. There is concern that the desire to promote outdoor recreation in the area will put delicate rock-dwelling plants at risk of being unintentionally trampled by users, potentially extirpating the species.
