= Theodore Roosevelt State Natural Area =

North Carolina state park

Theodore Roosevelt Natural Area
- IUCN category IV (habitat/species management area)
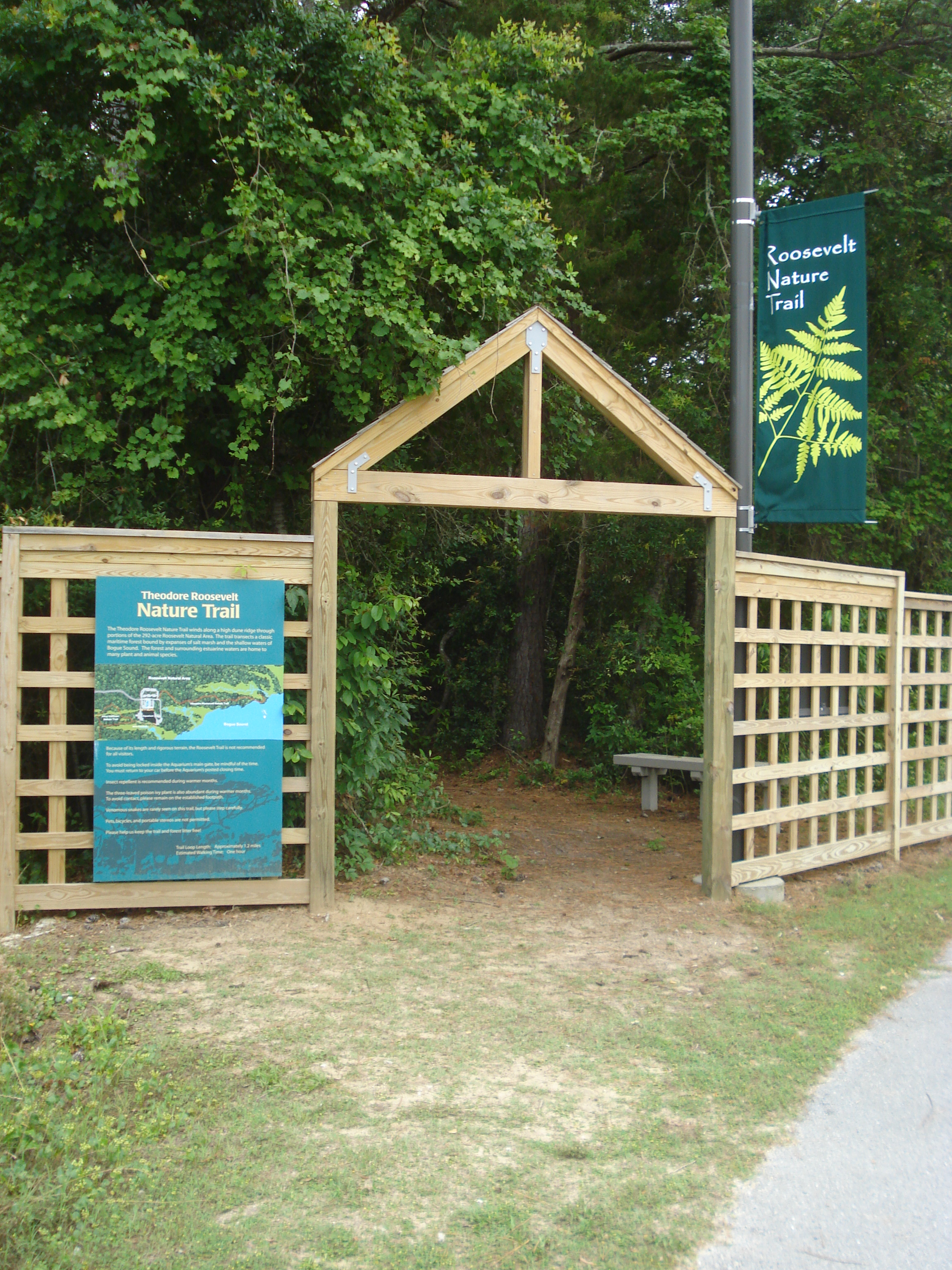
- Trailhead for the Roosevelt Nature Trail

- Location within North Carolina Location within the United States
- Location: Carteret, North Carolina, United States
- Coordinates: 34°41′50″N 76°49′59″W
- Area: 265 acres (107 ha)
- Elevation: 7 ft (2.1 m)
- Established: 1971
- Named for: Theodore Roosevelt
- Operator: North Carolina Division of Parks and Recreation
- Website: Theodore Roosevelt Natural Area

Theodore Roosevelt State Natural Area is a 265-acre (1.07 km^{2}) North Carolina state park in Carteret County, North Carolina, in the United States. Located on Bogue Banks, in the town of Pine Knoll Shores, the natural area protects the barrier island's only remaining intact maritime forest. It is bounded by NC 58 to the south, Bogue Sound to the north, and private development to the east and west.

In 1971, it was donated to the state by the grandchildren of Theodore Roosevelt as a living memorial to the 26th President's dedication to conservation. The nature preserve is most well known for the North Carolina Aquarium at Pine Knoll Shores, which it surrounds.

The natural area is jointly managed by the aquarium and Fort Macon State Park, which is 8 miles (13 km) to the east. Most of the natural area is not open to the general public due to its fragile nature, but two nature trails allow for limited access to the area. All visitor facilities are accessed from the aquarium's inholding.

== History ==
In 1917, Alice Green Hoffman, the daughter of a wealthy New York City mercantile family, purchased a large portion of Bogue Banks as a retreat. She moved there permanently, in 1938, staying until her death in March 1953. Having no children of her own, she willed the land to her niece Eleanor Butler Alexander-Roosevelt, who had visited her regularly. Later, Eleanor and her husband, Theodore Roosevelt Jr., left the property to their four children. In 1971, the grandchildren of Theodore Roosevelt decided to donate 298 acres (1.21 km^{2}) of Hoffman's property to the state of North Carolina, in honor of their grandfather. The donation stipulated that the acreage be "kept in its natural state, maintained as a nature preserve, and used for the primary purpose of nature and wildlife education, estuarine studies, with emphasis on marine life, ecological advances, environmental balance and research in the methods of conservation". Another provision allowed for the establishment of a "Marine Resource Center" on 25.04 acres (0.1013 km^{2}) of the property. This center opened in 1976 and later became the North Carolina Aquarium at Pine Knoll Shores. The remaining 265 acres (1.07 km^{2}) were established as Theodore Roosevelt State Natural Area.

== Ecology ==
The natural area is covered in a dense maritime forest which ranges form 15 feet (4.6 m) tall, on the ocean side, to 60 feet (18 m) tall, on the sound side of the island. Live oak, laurel oak, loblolly pine and red cedar are the dominant species. American olive, bay tree, wax myrtle and silverling also grow along the sound side of the forest. Cabbage palmetto also grow along the bay/ocean side of the forest. Additionally, brackish and salt marshes are found in the preserve, which support communities of black needlerush, salt grass, smooth cordgrass, eelgrass and slough grass.

Birds are abundant in the natural area, as the various communities provide feeding and nesting grounds for many species. Snowy and great egrets hunt in nature preserve's ponds and marshes, along with ospreys, pelicans, ibises and anhingas. Swainson's warbler and black-throated green warbler have been known to nest in the forests. Other animals, such as raccoons also scavenge in the preserve. Alligators and manatees are found in rivers and inland lagoons in the natural area. Common invertebrates are blue crabs, oysters, clams and fiddler crabs.

== Recreation ==
Recreation at the state natural area is limited to hiking and nature observation, such as birdwatching. Two nature trails allow for limited exploration of the nature preserve. All visitor facilities are accessed from the aquarium.

=== Alice Hoffman Nature Trail ===
The 0.5-mile (0.80 km) Alice Hoffman Nature Trail begins on the aquariums marsh boardwalk, and aquarium admission is required to use the trail. The trail starts off from the Coastal Plains Gallery's Marsh Boardwalk, and it crosses a pond and by marsh lands.

=== Roosevelt Nature Trail ===
The 1.5-mile (2.4 km) Roosevelt Nature Trail is accessed from west end of the aquarium's parking lot, and aquarium admission is not required to use the trail. The out and back trail traverses a dune ridge, through an old growth maritime forest, and it takes hikers by sound-side and interior marshes.

== Nearby state parks ==
The following state parks are within 30 miles (48 km) of Theodore Roosevelt State Natural Area:

- Fort Macon State Park (Carteret County)
- Hammocks Beach State Park (Onslow County)

== See also ==
- Fort Macon State Park
- North Carolina Aquarium at Pine Knoll Shores
