= List of North Carolina state parks =

The State of North Carolina has a group of protected areas known as the North Carolina State Park System, which is managed by the North Carolina Division of Parks and Recreation (NCDPR), an agency of the North Carolina Department of Natural and Cultural Resources (NCDNCR). Units of the system can only be established by an act of the General Assembly of North Carolina. The park system began in 1916 when the summit of Mount Mitchell became first state park in the Southeastern United States. According to the Division of Parks & Recreation, "the State Parks Act of 1987 lists six types of units included in the NC State Parks System." These are State Parks, State Recreation Areas, State Natural Areas, State Lakes, State Trails, and State Rivers. All units of the system are owned and/or managed by the division, and the division leases some of the units to other agencies for operation. Most units of the park system are also components of State Nature and Historic Preserve.

North Carolina State Parks (Hover mouse over pog to popup clickable link)
Green - State Park
Red - State Recreation Area
Blue - State Natural Area

== State Parks ==
State Parks are the principle unit of the state park system. The NC Division of Parks & Recreation describes its parks as follows:

Generally, State Parks are expected to possess both significant natural resource values and significant recreational values. State Parks are expected to accommodate the development of facilities, but may vary in the extent of development depending upon what can be provided without damage to the scenic or natural features. Facilities are planned and constructed to keep disturbance of natural resources to a minimum and to leave a "liberal portion" of each park undisturbed and free from improvements and structures, except for trails.

Several of the State Parks are new and are still being planned and developed. A few of the older state parks were greatly expanded in size in the 2000s adding trails and bike paths open to the public.

Park Name	Web- site	Region	County or Counties	Size	Year Established	Status	Remarks
Carolina Beach State Park		Coast	New Hanover	761 acres (3.08 km^{2})	1969	Open	Named not for a beach, rather the Town of Carolina Beach, the park is located along the banks of the Cape Fear River and Snow's Cut (part of the Intracoastal Waterway). The park is best known for its variety of wild carnivorous plants, including the Venus Flytrap.
Carvers Creek State Park		Coastal Plain	Cumberland	4,530 acres (18.3 km^{2})	2005	Open	Under development; Interim facilities are open at the park's historic Long Valley Farm Access.
Chimney Rock State Park		Mountains	Rutherford, Polk, Buncombe, Henderson	8,014 acres (32.43 km^{2})	2005	Open	Under development; The park protects the landscape of Hickory Nut Gorge, including its most well known feature, Chimney Rock.
Cliffs of the Neuse State Park		Coastal Plain	Wayne	1,097 acres (4.44 km^{2})	1945	Open	The park protects ancient cliff faces located along the banks of the Neuse River.
Crowders Mountain State Park		Piedmont	Gaston	5,217 acres (21.11 km^{2})	1973	Open	The park protects the Kings Mountain Ridgeline in North Carolina, including its highest peaks Crowder's Mountain and King's Pinnacle. The park is also adjacent to Kings Mountain State Park in South Carolina, which in turn is adjacent to Kings Mountain National Military Park. All three parks are connected via the Kings Mountain Ridgeline Trail.
Dismal Swamp State Park		Coastal Plain	Camden	14,432 acres (58.40 km^{2})	1974	Open	Under development; The park protects large part of the Great Dismal Swamp, and it is adjacent to Great Dismal Swamp National Wildlife Refuge. It is bounded on the east by the Dismal Swamp Canal.
Elk Knob State Park		Mountains	Watauga, Ashe	4,423 acres (17.90 km^{2})	2002	Open	Under development; The park preserves some of the highest peaks in Ashe and Watauga Counties, and it protects headwaters of the North Fork New River.
Eno River State Park		Piedmont	Durham, Orange	4,319 acres (17.48 km^{2})	1973	Open	The park protects the banks of the Eno River and surrounding lands.
Fort Macon State Park		Coast	Carteret	424 acres (1.72 km^{2})	1924	Open	The first North Carolina State Park to open to the public. It protects the historic Fort Macon and the eastern end of Bogue Banks.
Goose Creek State Park		Coastal Plain	Beaufort	1,672 acres (6.77 km^{2})	1974	Open	The park protects part of the landscape along the Pamlico Sound.
Gorges State Park		Mountains	Transylvania	7,709 acres (31.20 km^{2})	1999	Open	Under development; North Carolina's westernmost state park; it is located along the steep Blue Ridge Escarpment. The park is best known for the many waterfalls it provides access to, both inside the park and on adjacent public lands.
Grandfather Mountain State Park		Mountains	Avery, Watauga, Caldwell	3,647 acres (14.76 km^{2})	2009	Open	Under development; Adjacent to the Blue Ridge Parkway, the park protects the highest peak located along the Blue Ridge Escarpment. The park consists of lands formerly known as the "backcountry area" when it was privately owned nature preserve.
Hammocks Beach State Park		Coast	Onslow	1,611 acres (6.52 km^{2})	1961	Open	While protecting a variety of maritime habitats, the park is most known for its four-mile (6.4 km) long barrier island, Bear Island. The park operates a passenger ferry service between the mainland and island in the warmer months.
Hanging Rock State Park		Piedmont	Stokes	9,011 acres (36.47 km^{2})	1935	Open	The park encompasses the eastern end of the Sauratown Mountain range, including a geologic feature known as Hanging Rock. It also protects a segment of the Dan River.
Haw River State Park		Piedmont	Rockingham, Guilford	1,485 acres (6.01 km^{2})	2003	Open	Under development; This park preserves large wetlands along the Haw River.
Jockey's Ridge State Park		Coast	Dare	427 acres (1.73 km^{2})	1975	Open	The park protects the tallest sand dune system on the East Coast of the United States.
Jones Lake State Park		Coastal Plain	Bladen	1,669 acres (6.75 km^{2})	1939	Open	The park surrounds Jones State Lake and Salters State Lake, both of which are largely undeveloped Carolina Bay lakes. Until 1965, it was one of two parks open to Black people.
Lake James State Park		Mountains	McDowell, Burke	3,743 acres (15.15 km^{2})	1987	Open	Under redevelopment; Located near the base of Linville Gorge, the park encompasses large parts of the Lake James shoreline. In 2004, the park nearly octupled in size after a land deal with Crescent Resources.
Lake Norman State Park		Piedmont	Iredell	1,942 acres (7.86 km^{2})	1962	Open	Formerly known as Duke Power State Park, most of this park consists of lands donated by Duke Power along the shores of Lake Norman, the largest manmade body of fresh water in North Carolina.
Lake Waccamaw State Park		Coastal Plain	Columbus	2,398 acres (9.70 km^{2})	1976	Open	This park is along the shoreline of Lake Waccamaw, the largest natural Carolina Bay lake.
Lumber River State Park		Coastal Plain	Scotland, Hoke, Robeson, Columbus	13,695 acres (55.42 km^{2})	1989	Open	The State Park with the greatest geographic expanse, it preserves the banks of the black water Lumber River, which is Wild and Scenic River and a State River.
Mayo River State Park		Piedmont	Rockingham	2,778 acres (11.24 km^{2})	2003	Open	Under development; This new, still growing park is located along the Mayo River.
Medoc Mountain State Park		Piedmont	Halifax	3,893 acres (15.75 km^{2})	1973	Open	At 325 foot (99 m), Medoc Mountain isn't a true mountain but rather the remnant of a former mountain range which eroded long ago. The park preserves the land around the Medoc, as well as the banks of nearby Little Fishing Creek.
Merchants Millpond State Park		Coastal Plain	Gates	3,520 acres (14.2 km^{2})	1973	Open	The park protects a unique, cypress filled millpond and the Lassiter Swamp.
Morrow Mountain State Park		Piedmont	Stanly	5,702 acres (23.08 km^{2})	1935	Open	At 936 foot (285 m), Morrow Mountain is the fourth tallest peak of the Uwharrie Mountains, and the park encompasses several peaks of the range, just west of the Yadkin / Pee Dee River.
Mount Mitchell State Park		Mountains	Yancey	4,789 acres (19.38 km^{2})	1916	Open	The first North Carolina State Park, it protects the summit of Mount Mitchell the highest point in the eastern United States.
New River State Park		Mountains	Alleghany, Ashe	3,323 acres (13.45 km^{2})	1975	Open	This park preserves the landscape along the New River, which is Wild and Scenic River and a State River.
Pettigrew State Park		Coastal Plain	Tyrrell, Washington	5,951 acres (24.08 km^{2})	1936	Open	The park protects the banks of Lake Phelps, the state's second largest natural lake, and the Scuppernong River.
Pilot Mountain State Park		Piedmont	Surry, Yadkin	3,872 acres (15.67 km^{2})	1968	Open	The park encompasses the western end of the Sauratown Mountain range, including Pilot Mountain, as well as an island filled segment of the Yadkin River.
Pisgah View State Park		Mountains	Buncombe, Haywood	205 acres (0.83 km^{2})	2019	Closed	Planned State Park on the property of Pisgah View Ranch, near Mount Pisgah and Pisgah National Forest.
Raven Rock State Park		Piedmont	Harnett	4,810 acres (19.5 km^{2})	1970	Open	Located along both banks of the Cape Fear River, the park encompasses a rock outcropping where the river crosses the Fall Line.
Rendezvous Mountain State Park		Mountains	Wilkes	1,800 acres (7.3 km^{2})	1926 (Note: Rendezvous Mountain was originally established as North Carolina's third state park in 1926. It was transferred to the Division of Forestry in 1956. From 1984 to early 2022, it was operated as an educational state forest. It was returned to the state park system in 2022.)	Open	Popularly rumored to have been an assembly point for the Overmountain Men during the Revolutionary War.
Singletary Lake State Park		Coastal Plain	Bladen	649 acres (2.63 km^{2})	1939	Limited	The park surrounds Singletary Lake, which is a State Lake and a Carolina Bay lake. The park's facilities are usually reserved for registered group campers, but limited day use may be allowed while the camps are unoccupied.
South Mountains State Park		Mountains	Burke	20,949 acres (84.78 km^{2})	1978	Open	Under redevelopment; The largest unit of the state park system, it encompasses a large part of the South Mountains range, which is a branch of the Blue Ridge Mountains.
Stone Mountain State Park		Mountains	Alleghany, Wilkes	14,353 acres (58.08 km^{2})	1969	Open	Adjacent to the Blue Ridge Parkway, this large park's centerpiece is a granite dome named Stone Mountain.
William B. Umstead State Park		Piedmont	Wake	5,599 acres (22.66 km^{2})	1945	Open	This large, forested park is in the heart of the Research Triangle. It was originally known as Crabtree Creek State Park. In 1950, the 1,234 acres (4.99 km^{2}) southern section was carved out for a Blacks-only park. In 1955, the Crabtree Creek section was renamed William B. Umstead. It was desegregated in 1965.

== State Recreation Areas ==
State Recreation Areas are more intensely developed units than State Parks, and they largely encompass lands less sensitive to human activities than State Parks. According to the NC Division of Parks & Recreation:

State Recreation Areas are sites where the primary purpose is outdoor recreation, rather than preservation. More intensive development of facilities is provided than in State Parks. Protection and enjoyment of the natural resources are still important, and the sites are expected to contain scenic and attractive natural features. Development is planned and constructed to keep a "reasonable amount" of each area undisturbed and free from improvements and structures.

State Recreation Area	Web- site	Region	Counties	Size	Established	Status	Remarks
Falls Lake State Recreation Area		Piedmont	Wake, Durham	5,035 acres (20.38 km^{2})	1982	Open	This recreation area is located along the shores of Falls Lake, a U.S. Army Corps of Engineers built reservoir.
Fort Fisher State Recreation Area		Coast	New Hanover	287 acres (1.16 km^{2})	1986	Open	This recreation area is known for its long, sandy beach between the Cape Fear River and the Atlantic Ocean. This is the only unit of the park system that allows four-wheel drive vehicles off-road.
Jordan Lake State Recreation Area		Piedmont	Chatham	4,558 acres (18.45 km^{2})	1981	Open	This recreation area is located along the shores of Jordan Lake, a U.S. Army Corps of Engineers built reservoir.
Kerr Lake State Recreation Area		Piedmont	Vance, Warren	3,376 acres (13.66 km^{2})	1952	Open	This recreation area is located along the North Carolinian shores of Kerr Lake, a U.S. Army Corps of Engineers built reservoir, which is along the border of North Carolina and Virginia.

== State Natural Areas ==
State Natural Areas protect areas more sensitive to human activities than State Parks. Most of the State Natural Areas are undeveloped and have limited to no facilities, and some of them are closed to the general public to protect rare, fragile ecosystems. A few have developed facilities for low intensity, passive recreation, as well as facilities for public interpretation and education of the natural area. The NC Division of Parks & Recreation states:

The purpose of State Natural Areas is focused on preserving and protecting areas of scientific, aesthetic, or ecological value. Facilities are limited to those needed for interpretation, protection, and minimum maintenance. Generally, recreational and public use facilities such as camping, swimming, picnicking, and the like are not provided in State Natural Areas.

State Natural Area	Web- site	Region	Counties	Size	Established	Public Access	Remarks
Bakers Lake State Natural Area	—	Coastal Plain	Bladen	0 acres (0 km^{2})	2021	Undeveloped	Established to protect an undeveloped, 75-acre (0.30 km^{2}) natural lake.
Baldhead Island State Natural Area	—	Coast	Brunswick	1,260 acres (5.1 km^{2})	1979	Undeveloped	Contiguous to Fort Fisher State Recreation Area, this undeveloped natural area preserves a large portion of the Smith Island Complex, which consists of barrier islands, salt marshes, bays, tidal creeks and estuarine islands.
Bay Tree State Natural Area	—	Coastal Plain	Bladen	609 acres (2.46 km^{2})	1979	Undeveloped	Former State Park which was never developed. It consists of lands adjacent to Bay Tree State Lake.
Bear Paw State Natural Area	—	Mountains	Avery	384 acres (1.55 km^{2})	2008	Undeveloped	The natural area is located just north of Grandfather Mountain State Park, and it protects Hanging Rock Ridge and the headwaters of Dutch Creek. The Cherokee name for the site is "Yonah‑wayah", which means "Bear's Paw". It is managed by Elk Knob State Park.
Beech Creek Bog State Natural Area	—	Mountains	Watauga	295 acres (1.19 km^{2})	2002		The natural area protects a southern Appalachian bog.
Bobs Creek State Natural Area		Mountains	McDowell	6,000 acres (24 km^{2})	2017	Closed	Historically known as Bob's Pocket Wilderness, the natural area conserves high quality, rare natural communities.
Bullhead Mountain State Natural Area	—	Mountains	Alleghany	442 acres (1.79 km^{2})	2000	Limited	This natural area is adjacent to the Blue Ridge Parkway and just north of Stone Mountain State Park.
Bushy Lake State Natural Area	—	Coastal Plain	Cumberland	6,396 acres (25.88 km^{2})	1977	Undeveloped	Managed by Jones Lake State Park, the natural area protects an area of wet pocosin and carolina bay forest.
Chowan Swamp State Natural Area	—	Coastal Plain	Gates	6,066 acres (24.55 km^{2})	1973	Open	Located along the northern shores of the Chowan River, this natural area is leased by the North Carolina Wildlife Resources Commission for management as part of the larger Chowan Swamp Game Land.
Hemlock Bluffs State Natural Area		Piedmont	Wake	97 acres (0.39 km^{2})	1976	Open	The natural area is leased by the Town of Cary for operation as Hemlock Bluffs Nature Preserve.
Lea Island State Natural Area	—	Coast	Pender	25 acres (0.10 km^{2})	2000	Limited	The natural area preserves a largely undeveloped barrier island.
Lower Haw River State Natural Area		Piedmont	Chatham	1,025 acres (4.15 km^{2})	2003	Open	Under development; This natural area is adjacent to and managed by Jordan Lake State Recreation Area, and it has one 2-mile (3.2 km) hiking trail along the Haw River.
Masonboro Island State Natural Area		Coast	New Hanover	106 acres (0.43 km^{2})	1976	Undeveloped	Managed by the North Carolina Division of Coastal Management, this natural area preserves an undeveloped barrier island, near Wilmington, North Carolina. The island is only accessible by boat.
Mitchells Millpond State Natural Area	—	Piedmont	Wake	93 acres (0.38 km^{2})	1976	Undeveloped	The natural area protects granitic flatrock outcrops. The ecosystem of the flatrocks is unique and fragile.
Mount Jefferson State Natural Area		Mountains	Ashe	1,188 acres (4.81 km^{2})	1956	Open	Formerly a State Park, this natural area is managed as a satellite of New River State Park, and it preserves the prominent peak of Mount Jefferson.
Occoneechee Mountain State Natural Area		Piedmont	Orange	221 acres (0.89 km^{2})	1997	Open	Managed as a satellite of Eno River State Park, this natural area preserves the highest point in Orange County.
Pineola Bog State Natural Area	—	Mountains	Avery	91 acres (0.37 km^{2})	2006		The natural area protects a southern Appalachian bog.
Run Hill State Natural Area	—	Coast	Dare	123 acres (0.50 km^{2})	1995	Undeveloped	Managed as a satellite of Jockey's Ridge State Park, the natural area preserves Run Hill, a large sand dune north of Jockey's Ridge.
Salmon Creek State Natural Area		Coastal Plain	Bertie	1,002 acres (4.05 km^{2})	2017	Closed	The natural area contains high-quality natural communities, and important archaeological sites.
Sandy Run Savannas State Natural Area	—	Coastal Plain	Pender, Onslow	3,133 acres (12.68 km^{2})	2006	Closed	The natural area preserves southern pine savannas.
Sugar Mountain Bog State Natural Area	—	Mountains	Avery	102 acres (0.41 km^{2})	2006		The natural area protects a southern Appalachian bog.
Theodore Roosevelt State Natural Area		Coast	Carteret	265 acres (1.07 km^{2})	1971	Open	Jointly managed by Fort Macon State Park and the North Carolina Aquarium at Pine Knoll Shores, the natural area preserves Bogue Banks' only intact maritime forest.
Warwick Mill Bay State Natural Area	—	Coastal Plain	Robeson	976 acres (3.95 km^{2})	2017	Closed	The natural area protects an undisturbed Carolina Bay, which is an important nesting site for birds. Audubon North Carolina assists with the management of the property.
Weymouth Woods-Sandhills Nature Preserve		Coastal Plain	Moore	915 acres (3.70 km^{2})	1963	Open	The first North Carolina State Natural Area, it preserves strands of longleaf pine forests in Sandhills region.
Yellow Mountain State Natural Area	—	Mountains	Mitchell, Avery	3,809 acres (15.41 km^{2})	2008	Limited	The natural area protects a Grassy Bald in the Roan Highlands range. The natural area is adjacent to the Pisgah National Forest.

== State Lakes ==
State Lakes are all large, naturally formed bodies of water in the state's Coastal Plain. Most of the lakes are Carolina Bays. The NC Division of Parks & Recreation describes its State Lakes as follows:

Chapter 165 of the Laws of 1929 specified that "all lakes now belonging to the State having an area of 50 acres or more" should be "administered as provided for other recreational areas now owned by the State." This allowed the then-Department of Conservation and Development to assume management authority for seven Coastal Plain lakes that became units of the State Parks System known as State Lakes. Most of these are administratively included as part of an adjoining State Park, but one of the lakes (White Lake) has no public ownership on its shoreline.

State Lake	Adjoining State Park	Counties	Size	Remarks
Bay Tree State Lake	Bay Tree State Park	Bladen	1,418 acres (5.74 km^{2})	Bay Tree Lake was formerly known as Black Lake.
Jones State Lake	Jones Lake State Park	Bladen	224 acres (0.91 km^{2})	The shore line of Jones Lake is entirely owned by the state.
Phelps State Lake	Pettigrew State Park	Washington, Tyrrell	16,600 acres (67 km^{2})	Phelps is North Carolina's second largest natural lake.
Salters State Lake	Jones Lake State Park	Bladen	315 acres (1.27 km^{2})	Salters is the only State Lake without development along its shores.
Singletary State Lake	Singletary Lake State Park	Bladen	572 acres (2.31 km^{2})	The shore line of Singletary Lake is entirely owned by the state.
Waccamaw State Lake	Lake Waccamaw State Park	Columbus	8,938 acres (36.17 km^{2})	Lake Waccamaw is the largest natural Carolina Bay lake.
White State Lake	None	Bladen	1,068 acres (4.32 km^{2})	This is the only State Lake without public lands along its shores.

== State Trails ==
State Trails are one of the principal components of the State Trail System. State Trails may be either long-distance, hiking trails or paddle trails. State Trails may have land components for providing a trail corridor or for protecting significant features or resources along the trail. Most of these lands are leased to other land management agencies. All of the State Trails are joint projects with other government agencies and nonprofit organizations. The following is the NC Division of Parks & Recreation description of State Trails:

The North Carolina Trails System Act was passed in 1973 to help provide for the state's outdoor recreation needs and to promote public access to natural and scenic areas. The act prescribed methods for establishing a statewide system of scenic trails, recreation trails, and connecting or side trails. The Trails System includes "park trails", which are designated and managed as units of the State Parks System known as State Trails, and "designated trails", which are managed by other governmental agencies or corporations.

State Trail	Web- site	Region	Designated Length	Size	Established	Remarks
Dan River State Trail		Piedmont	0 miles (0 km)	0 acres (0 km^{2})	2021	A paddle trail on the Dan River in Stokes and Rockingham Counties.
Deep River State Trail		Piedmont	0 miles (0 km)	1,274 acres (5.16 km^{2})	2007	Planned hiking and paddle trail along the Deep River.
East Coast Greenway State Trail		Coastal Plain	0 miles (0 km)	0 acres (0 km^{2})	2021	North Carolina's section of a developing bikeway spanning the East Coast of the United States.
Equine State Trail		Piedmont	0 miles (0 km)	0 acres (0 km^{2})	2023	A bridle path in North Carolina's Sandhills region.
Fonta Flora State Trail		Mountains	19 miles (31 km)	203 acres (0.82 km^{2})	2015	Planned hiking and bicycling trail that will encircle the eastern half of Lake James.
French Broad River State Trail		Mountains	117 miles (188 km)	0 acres (0 km^{2})	1987	A paddle trail extending from the beginning of the French Broad River in Rosman, to I-40 in Asheville.
Haw River State Trail		Piedmont	0 miles (0 km)	0 acres (0 km^{2})	2023	A paddle and hiking trail connecting Haw River State Park and Jordan Lake State Recreation Area.
Hickory Nut Gorge State Trail		Mountains	0 miles (0 km)	0 acres (0 km^{2})	2017	A trail planned to encircle Hickory Nut Gorge and Lake Lure.
Mountains-to-Sea State Park Trail		State	669 miles (1,077 km)	778 acres (3.15 km^{2})	2000	The Mountains-to-Sea Trail (MST) is a Long-distance, hiking trail, which runs across North Carolina from the Great Smoky Mountains to the Outer Banks. Still a work in progress, the trail will be approximately a 1,000 miles (1,600 km) long when completed.
Northern Peaks State Trail		Mountains	0 miles (0 km)	0 acres (0 km^{2})	2019	A hiking trail planned to go over several mountain peaks from Rivers Park in Boone to Mount Jefferson State Natural Area.
Overmountain Victory State Trail		Mountains	49.5 miles (79.7 km)	0 acres (0 km^{2})	2019	The Overmountain Victory Trail roughly follows the historic route of the Overmountain Men on their march to the Battle of Kings Mountain.
Roanoke River State Trail		Coastal Plain	0 miles (0 km)	0 acres (0 km^{2})	2021	A paddle trail on the Roanoke River from Roanoke Rapids to the Albemarle Sound.
Saluda Grade State Trail		Mountains	0 miles (0 km)	0 acres (0 km^{2})	2023	A planned rail trail along Norfolk Southern Railway's W Line, from Zirconia to the North Carolina-South Carolina state line.
Wilderness Gateway State Trail		Mountains	0 miles (0 km)	1,474 acres (5.97 km^{2})	2019	Proposed trail to connect the Overmountain Victory Trail, South Mountains State Park, Valdese, and Hickory.
Yadkin River State Trail		Piedmont	130 miles (210 km)	0 acres (0 km^{2})	1987	This paddle trail is along a mostly free-flowing stretch of the Yadkin River between the W. Kerr Scott Dam and the beginning of High Rock Lake. There are only two small impoundments along the trail, and neither one creates a large reservoir.

== State Rivers ==
State Rivers are components of the state's Natural and Scenic Rivers System, which is the state's equivalent to the National Wild and Scenic Rivers System. Most of the state's National Wild and Scenic Rivers, are also State Rivers and vice versa. The NC Division of Parks & Recreation states that:

The Natural and Scenic Rivers System was created by the 1971 General Assembly to preserve and protect certain free flowing rivers, their water quality and their adjacent lands for the benefit of present and future generations. The Natural and Scenic Rivers Act established criteria and methods for inclusion of components to the system. Components of the Natural and Scenic Rivers System are State Rivers, and are also units of the State Parks System.

State River	Region	Designated Length	Size	Established	Remarks
Horsepasture State Natural River	Mountains	4.5 miles (7.2 km)	0 acres (0 km^{2})	1985	The river is located in the Pisgah National Forest, within a moderate 1.75 miles (2.82 km) hike of Gorges State Park, via the Rainbow Falls Trail.
Linville State Natural River	Mountains	13.0 miles (20.9 km)	0 acres (0 km^{2})	1975	The river is located in the middle of the Linville Gorge Wilderness.
Lumber State Natural River	Coastal Plain	34.5 miles (55.5 km)	0 acres (0 km^{2})	1989	Lumber River State Park is along portions of the adjacent river banks.
Lumber State Scenic River	Coastal Plain	52.0 miles (83.7 km)	0 acres (0 km^{2})	1989	Lumber River State Park is along portions of the adjacent river banks.
Lumber State Recreational River	Coastal Plain	15.5 miles (24.9 km)	0 acres (0 km^{2})	1989	Lumber River State Park is along portions of the adjacent river banks.
New State Scenic River	Mountains	26.5 miles (42.6 km)	0 acres (0 km^{2})	1975	New River State Park is along portions of the adjacent river banks.

== Former units ==
Some units have been formally removed from the NC State Park System and transferred to other agencies for management.

When the State Historic Site system was established in 1955, the system's first six components were historic properties transferred from the State Park System.

One unit, Rendezvous Mountain, was transferred back to the park system, after 66 years in the state forest system.

Former unit	Web- site	Region	Counties	Size †	Established	Removed	Status	Remarks
Battle of Alamance		Piedmont	Alamance	40 acres (0.16 km^{2})	1953	1955	Open	The park was transferred as one of the initial components of the State Historic Site system.
Boone's Cave State Park		Piedmont	Davidson	110 acres (0.45 km^{2})	1971	2002	Open	Formerly managed by Morrow Mountain State Park, Boone's Cave is now a Davidson County Park.
Brunswick Town		Coast	Brunswick	119 acres (0.48 km^{2})	1952	1955	Open	The park was transferred as one of the initial components of the State Historic Site system.
Cape Hatteras State Park		Coast	Dare	1,200 acres (4.9 km^{2})	1935	1952	Open	Cape Hatteras State Park was located adjacent to Cape Hatteras Light, and it was transferred to the larger Cape Hatteras National Seashore.
Charles B. Aycock Birthplace		Coastal Plain	Wayne	1 acre (0.0040 km^{2})	1951	1955	Open	The park was transferred as one of the initial components of the State Historic Site system.
Frutchey State Park		Piedmont	Montgomery	53 acres (0.21 km^{2})	1937	1955	Open	The park was named after L. D. Frutchey, who donated the core property to the state, and it was later renamed "Town Creek State Park". The park was transferred as one of the initial components of the State Historic Site system, becoming known as Town Creek Indian Mound.
Hiwassee Lake State Park		Mountains	Cherokee	834 acres (3.38 km^{2})	1948	1952		The state leased land around Hiwassee Lake from the Tennessee Valley Authority for a few years.
James Iredell House		Coastal Plain	Chowan	2 acres (0.0081 km^{2})	1951	1955	Open	The park was transferred as one of the initial components of the State Historic Site system.
Reedy Creek State Park		Piedmont	Wake	1,234 acres (4.99 km^{2})	1950	1966	Open	Formed as a segregated park for black citizens, it was merged with William B. Umstead State Park during desegregation.
Sandhills State Recreation Area		Coastal Plain	Richmond		1939	1941	Open	Transferred to Wildlife Resources Commission. Now part of the Sandhills Game Land.
Tryon Palace		Coastal Plain	Craven	2 acres (0.0081 km^{2})	1952	1955	Open	The park was transferred as one of the initial components of the State Historic Site system.
Waynesborough State Park		Coastal Plain	Wayne	130 acres (0.53 km^{2})	1979	2003	Open	Formerly managed by Cliffs of the Neuse State Park, the park is now owned and managed by the Old Waynesborough Commission, a non-profit corporation.
† Size while the unit was part of the park system

== See also ==
- List of U.S. national parks
- List of North Carolina state forests
- List of National Natural Landmarks in North Carolina
