= Wilderness Gateway State Trail =

Unit of the North Carolina state park system

Wilderness Gateway Trail
- Length: 0 miles (0 km)
- Location: North Carolina, United States
- Established: 2019
- Designation: State Trail (North Carolina)
- Use: Hiking
- Season: Year-round
- Surface: Natural
- Maintainer: North Carolina Division of Parks and Recreation
- Website: Wilderness Gateway State Trail

The Wilderness Gateway State Trail is a unit of the North Carolina state park system in Burke, Catawba, McDowell and Rutherford Counties, North Carolina in the United States. The State Trail is planned as a hiking trail connecting the Town of Valdese, the City of Hickory, the Overmountain Victory National Historic Trail, South Mountains State Park and Chimney Rock State Park The trail is a collaboration between local governments and the state, with development coordinated by the North Carolina Division of Parks and Recreation (NCDPR).

== History ==
The trail started out of interest in creating a state park along the Jacob Fork River and Henry Fork River in Catawba County. On May 17, 2018, State Senator Andy Wells introduced a bill in the North Carolina General Assembly to create a Jacob Fork State Natural Area in Catawba County. The bill failed to pass, but support for the concept grew. Over the Fall of 2018, Catawba County, the City of Hickory, City of Newton, and the Town of Long View adopted resolutions in support of a state park along the rivers.

Hickory owned 160 acres (65 ha) of undeveloped land along Jacob Fork, with access to US 321, which the city originally acquired for a never realized economic development project in the 1990s. In early 2019, the city donated the property to the Foothills Conservancy of North Carolina to help establish the state park. Foothills Conservancy of North Carolina used the matching value of the city's donation to help them acquire 188 acres (76 ha) of adjoining land along the river in April that year. The conservancy intends on holding onto the properties until NCDPR is able to acquire them.

While the Foothills Conservancy of North Carolina was acquiring land for the state park system, another bill was introduced in the General Assembly to establish the Wilderness Gateway State Trail. Since the headwaters of Jacob Fork and Henry Fork are in South Mountains State Park, legislators reasoned authorizing a state trail along them would improve public access to the existing state park, while simultaneously permitting the NCDPR to acquire land along the rivers in Catawba County. The bill included a directive for NCDPR to study feasible routes for the trail, while also considering ways to improve access from Interstate 40 to South Mountains State Park. It requires NCDPR to report on its findings by December 1, 2019. The bill was signed into law on June 3, 2019.

In September 2020, Foothills Conservancy of North Carolina received a $1.2 million North Carolina Land and Water Fund Grant to acquire 1,126 acres in McDowell County for the trail.
