= Weymouth Woods-Sandhills Nature Preserve =

State park in North Carolina, United States

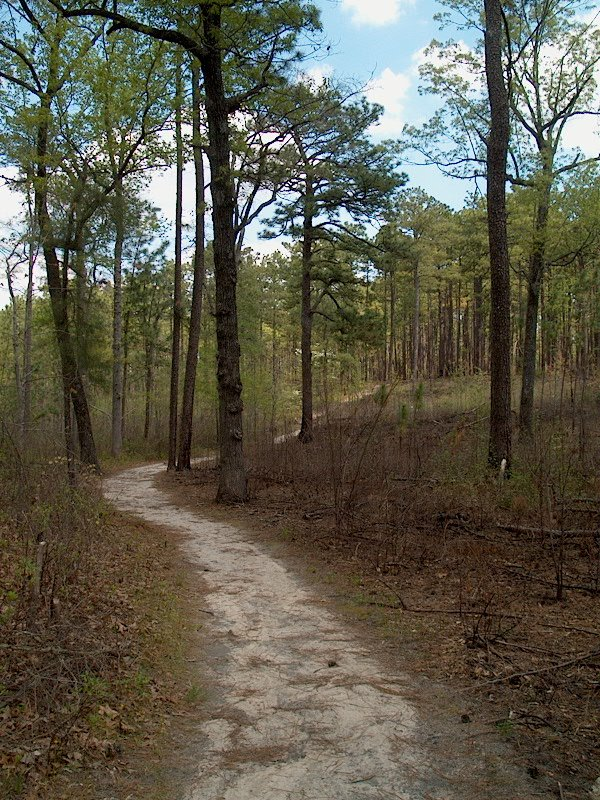

- Location within North Carolina Location within the United States
- Location: Moore, North Carolina, United States
- Coordinates: 35.1473°N 079.3689°W
- Area: 915 acres (370 ha)
- Established: 1963
- Governing body: North Carolina Division of Parks and Recreation
- Website: Weymouth Woods-Sandhills Nature Preserve

Weymouth Woods-Sandhills Nature Preserve is a North Carolina state park in Moore County, North Carolina in the United States. Located near Southern Pines, North Carolina, it covers 915 acres (3.70 km^{2}) in the Sandhills region of the state. Weymouth Woods is the location of the oldest known longleaf pine tree on record, a tree that was cross-dated at 458 years old.

== Geology ==
The unconsolidated sand of the Carolina Sandhills is mapped as the Quaternary Pinehurst Formation, and is interpreted as eolian (wind-blown) sand sheets and dunes that were mobilized episodically from approximately 75,000 to 6,000 years ago.

== Human history ==
In the mid-18th century, when Scottish Highlanders settled in the Sandhills region, the vast forest consisted of original growth longleaf pines that reached heights of 100 to 120 feet (37 m). Merchants cut the forests for timber and cultivated choice stands for use as masts for the Royal Navy ships. Merchants also harvested resin from the longleaf pines for the naval stores industry. Resin from longleaf pine yielded four basic products: tar, pitch, turpentine and rosin.

By 1850, North Carolina's pine forests were producing one-third of the world's supply of naval stores. Resin collected from elongated, inverted V-shaped cuts in the tree trunks was distilled into turpentine. Turpentine was used as a solvent and illuminant. Tar, pitch and rosin were used for sealing the hulls, decks, masts, ropes and riggings of sailing vessels.

When railroads arrived in the Sandhills in the 1870s, large-scale logging and lumbering began. As a result of logging and naval stores operations, most of the virgin growth of longleaf pines had disappeared from the Sandhills by 1900. Many of the older trees that survive today bear prominent scars of this human exploitation.

Early in the 20th century, the grandfather of James Boyd, a well-known North Carolina author, purchased a substantial tract of land east of Southern Pines to save the longleaf pines from logging. He named the estate Weymouth because the pines reminded him of trees in Weymouth, England. In April 1963, Boyd's widow, Katharine, donated 403 acres (1.63 km^{2}) of land to the state, establishing the first natural area in the North Carolina state parks system. Additional land has been acquired, including a satellite area of 153 acres (0.62 km^{2}) known as the Boyd Round Timber Tract, which was added in 1977.

== Ecology ==
James Creek, which bisects the preserve, is home to the rare mud sunfish and the sandhills chub, a fish native only to the Sandhills region. The creek is also home to brown bullhead, bluegill, and is nearly at the northernmost terminus for the dollar sunfish. The creek here, like most creeks in the region is described as a blackwater creek, a special environment characteristic of dark, tannin-stained water as well as high acidity, allowing a range of unique species to flourish.

== Weymouth Woods Sandhills Nature Preserve Museum ==
The preserve's exhibit hall focuses on the natural history of the longleaf pine forest, including geology, plants, animals and the use of prescribed fires to maintain the forest. One exhibit highlights the use of pine resin in the naval stores industry. The museum is located in the park's visitor center and is open daily. Naturalists also offer environmental education programs for the public and school groups.
