= Mount Jefferson State Natural Area =

State park in Ashe County, North Carolina

- IUCN category III (natural monument or feature)
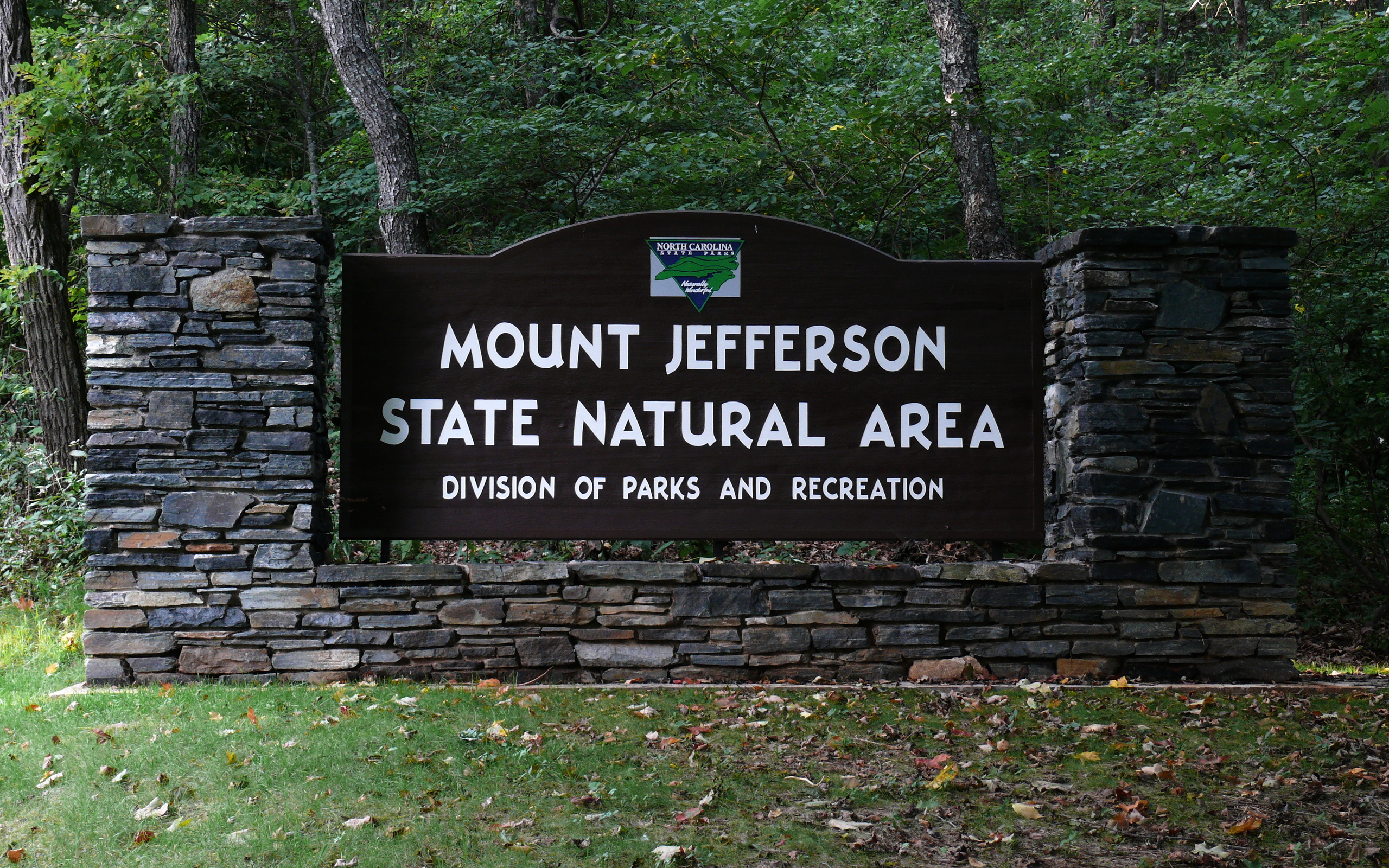

- Location within North Carolina Location within the United States
- Location: Ashe, North Carolina, United States
- Coordinates: 36°24′03″N 81°27′46″W
- Area: 1,188 acres (4.81 km^{2})
- Elevation: 4,660 ft (1,420 m)
- Established: 1956
- Named for: Mount Jefferson
- Governing body: North Carolina Division of Parks and Recreation
- Website: www.ncparks.gov/mount-jefferson-state-natural-area

U.S. National Natural Landmark
- Designated: 1974

Mount Jefferson State Natural Area is a 1,188-acre (4.81 km^{2}) North Carolina state park in Ashe County, North Carolina in the United States. Located near Jefferson, North Carolina, it includes the peak of Mount Jefferson, named for Thomas Jefferson and his father Peter, who owned land nearby and surveyed the North Carolina-Virginia border in 1749. In 1974, Mount Jefferson State Natural Area was designated as a National Natural Landmark by the National Park Service.

== History ==
In 1939 the Works Progress Administration created a road enabling widespread access to Mount Jefferson, which at the time had no official name and was primarily referenced to as Panther Mountain, likely due to a local legend of a panther once eating a child there. Local citizens donated land and money in efforts to attain state park status for the local park, which required the park to have a minimum of 400 acres (1.6 km^{2}). By 1956, their efforts yielded a 300-acre (1.2 km^{2}) donation and raised enough funds to buy an additional 164 acres (0.7 km^{2}) for the park. As a result, Mount Jefferson received its official name and became a state park in October 1956.

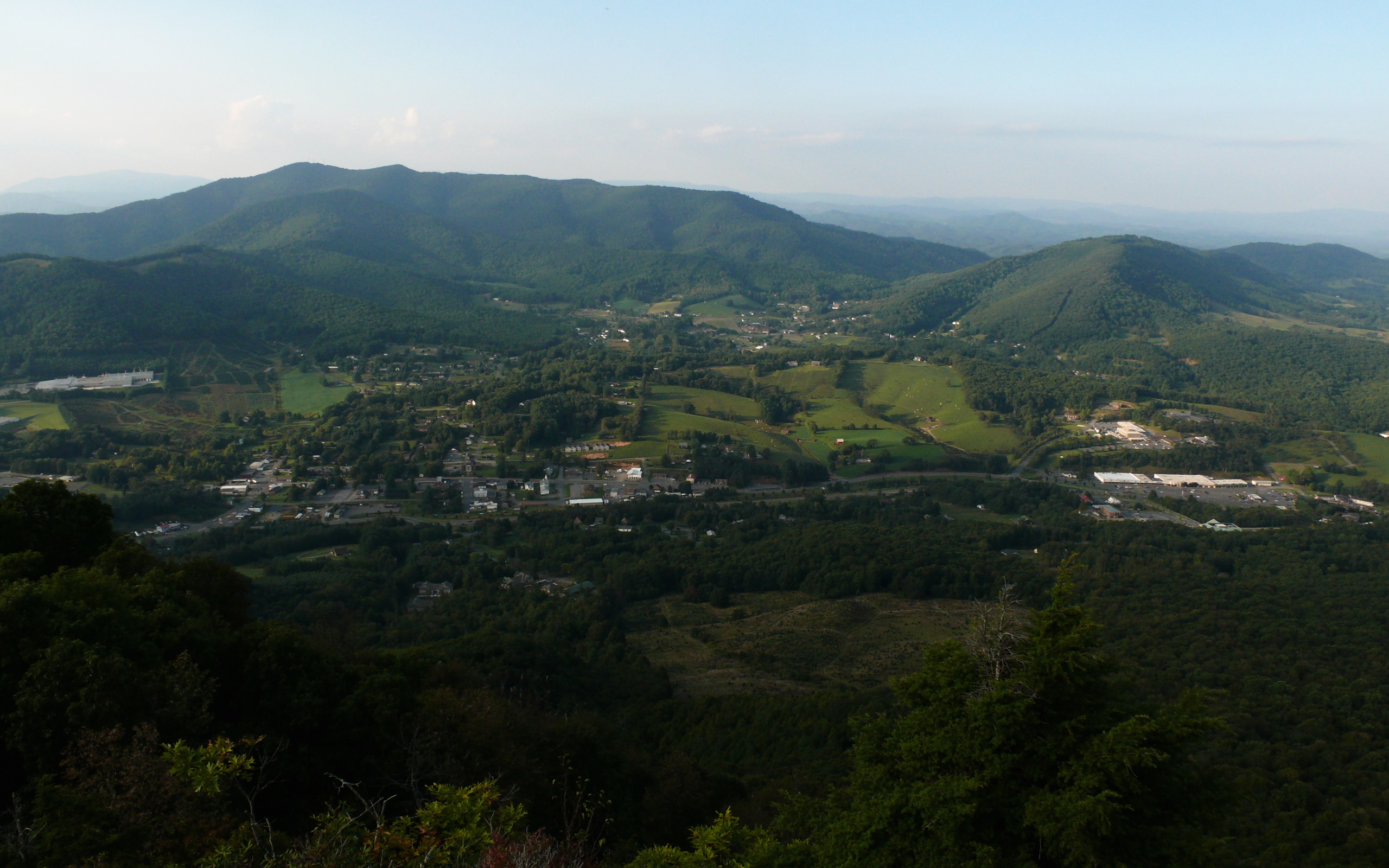
View from Mount Jefferson

== Tourist information ==
The park has one main road that leads to the peak of Mount Jefferson. On the way up are three overlooks; the Sunset Overlook, the Sunrise Overlook, and the Jefferson Overlook, as well as five hiking trails and a picnic shelter at the top. From the picnic shelter begins the Summit Trail, a 0.3 miles (0.48 km) that leads to the 1.1 miles (1.8 km) Rhodedendron Trail loop. At the end of the loop lies a short trail to the scenic Luther Rock, as well as the entrances to the 0.75 miles (1.21 km) Lost Province Trail loop. The mountain itself rises to more than 1,600 feet (490 m) above the surrounding landscape and provides a bird's-eye view of both Jefferson and West Jefferson. Park hours are limited by inclement weather, but otherwise open every day until sunset during the year with the exception of Christmas Day. The 2 miles (3.2 km), one-way Mountain Ridge Trail, which ascends to the peak of the mountain and through each overlook, may be accessed at the first park gate across from the park office during inclement weather, though caution is advised.

== Nearby state parks ==
The following state parks are within 30 miles (48 km) of Mount Jefferson State Natural Area:

- Elk Knob State Park
- Grandfather Mountain State Park
- Grayson Highlands State Park, Virginia
- New River State Park
- Rendezvous Mountain State Park
- Stone Mountain State Park

== See also ==
- Mount Jefferson
- Jefferson, North Carolina
