= Jones Lake State Park =

State park in North Carolina, United States

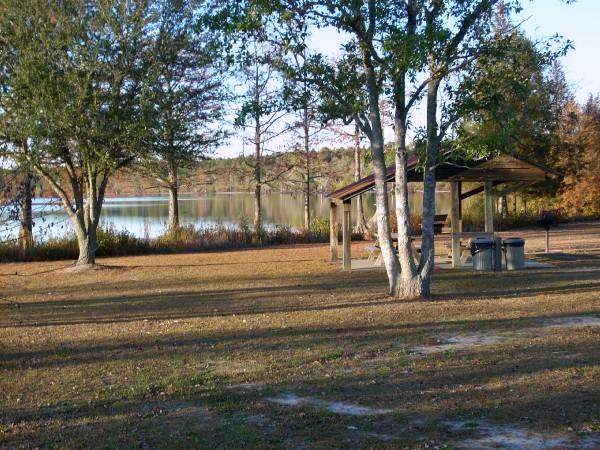

- Location within North Carolina Location within the United States
- Interactive map of Jones Lake State Park
- Location: Bladen County, North Carolina, United States
- Coordinates: 34°40′58″N 78°35′44″W
- Area: 2,208 acres (894 ha)
- Elevation: 75 ft (23 m)
- Established: 1939
- Administrator: North Carolina Division of Parks and Recreation
- Website: Official website

Jones Lake State Park is a North Carolina state park in Bladen County, North Carolina in the United States near Elizabethtown. It covers 2,208-acre (8.94 km^{2}), including the Carolina bay lakes of Jones Lake and Salters Lake. Jones Lake State Park is north of Elizabethtown on North Carolina Highway 242 in North Carolina's Coastal Plain region. The park offers year-round recreation, including fishing, swimming, boating, hiking, picnicking and environmental and historical education programs.

== Geology ==
Jones Lake is one of a series of Carolina Bay lakes that stretch from New Jersey to Florida along the Atlantic Coastal Plain. Recent work by the U.S. Geological Survey has interpreted the Carolina Bays as relict thermokarst lakes that formed several thousands of years ago when the climate was colder, drier, and windier. Thermokarst lakes develop by thawing of frozen ground (permafrost) and by subsequent modification by wind and water. Thus, this interpretation suggests that permafrost once extended as far south as the Carolina Bays during the last ice age and (or) previous ice ages. Jones Lake is not fed by any stream but relies entirely upon rain. The land beneath and surrounding the lake is mica-rich sandy clay and sand that is from the Upper Cretaceous era with a thin layer of Pleistocene deposits covering it. This land is lower than the surrounding land and drains very poorly, creating Jones Lake.

== Human history ==
The area surrounding Jones and Salters Lakes at Jones Lake State Park was settled by migrants for Europe in the late 1720s and early 1730s. Jones Lake was originally known as Woodward Lake a local justice of the peace. It was renamed Jones Lake for Isaac Jones a local land owner who donated the land on which Elizabethtown was built in 1773. Salters Lake is named for an American Revolutionary War heroine, Sallie Salter. Salter spied on Tories that were camped near Elizabethtown on the Cape Fear River.

The government of the state of North Carolina began to take an interest in Jones and Salters Lakes and other Carolina Bays in the 19th century. The North Carolina General Assembly blocked all further private claims on lakes. Soon after, the state assembly pass legislation that granted ownership of all lakes greater than 500 acres (2.02 km^{2}) in Cumberland, Columbus and Bladen Counties to the state. The formation of Jones Lake, Lake Waccamaw and Singletary Lake State Parks can be traced back to this piece of legislation.

The growth of the cotton, turpentine and lumber industries in the area of Jones Lake State Park eventually was greater than what the soil could support. The fertility of the farmland was depleted and most of the standing timber had been clear cut from Bladen County. The land could no longer support the demands of the people living on the land. Farmers were no longer able to produce sustainable crops and many were forced to leave their farms.

The National Park Service began purchasing the land surrounding Jones and Salters Lakes in 1936 for a recreational demonstration project. Out of work young men were employed by the Civilian Conservation Corps, which was established by United States President Franklin D. Roosevelt in 1933 during the Great Depression many of the facilities of Jones Lake State Park. The land was managed by the Resettlement Administration until 1939.

Jones Lake State Park was opened in 1939 during the segregation era as a state park for the use of African Americans. The black communities of southeastern North Carolina used Jones Lake State Park for family reunions, baptisms, and church picnics. A result of racial segregation of the state park systems was that the parks for blacks were left largely underfunded and thereby undeveloped. The area in and surrounded Jones Lake remains largely wild and undeveloped offering visitors a chance to see two Carolina Bays in a nearly natural state.

Jones Lake State Park, like Singletary Lake State Park just 13 miles (21 km) to the southeast, was used by soldiers training for World War II at nearby Camp Davis for special anti-craft training. The state park also received national attention in 1980 when astronomers gathered at the park to view a solar eclipse.

== Ecology ==
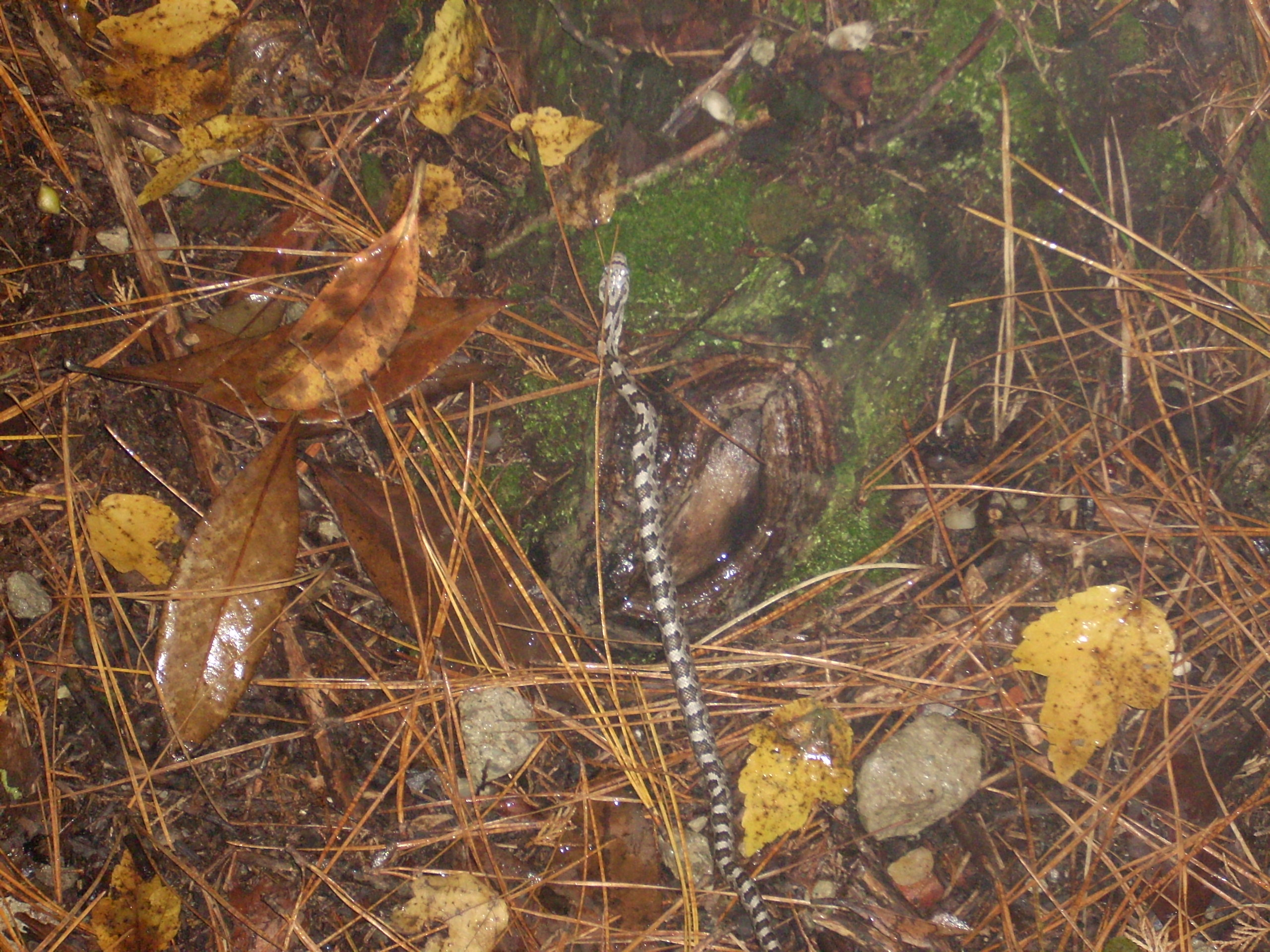
A snake photographed at the park

Jones Lake is surrounded by a bay forest. This forest consists primarily of bay trees such as the loblolly, red bay, pond pine and Atlantic white cedar. The understory consists of huckleberry, leucothoe, gallberry and pepperbush. turkey oak, blueberry, holly and longleaf pine can be found at the higher elevations away from the shoreline.

The forests of Jones Lake State Park provide a habitat for a variety of animals that are fairly common to an eastern woodland habitat. Wild turkey, white-tailed deer and rabbits can be spotted on from time to time. Wood ducks live on the lake. Red-cockaded woodpeckers can be seen in the forest as can red-tailed hawks, yellow-throated warbler, white-eyed vireo and pileated woodpeckers. Jones Lake State Park is also home to box turtles, fence lizards, pine barrens tree frog, southern toads, bullfrogs and carpenter frogs.

This park is also the place where the type specimen of Phyllophaga nebulosa, a species of June beetle, was found and is currently the only known location for this species.

== Recreation ==
Jones Lake State Park is open for year-round recreation, including camping, fishing, boating, hiking and environmental and historical education. Visitors to the park will find 20 campsites that are open for family camping. The sites are equipped with a picnic table and charcoal grill. Hot water showers are available at the park bath house. All campsites are available with a reservation. The campground is open year round.

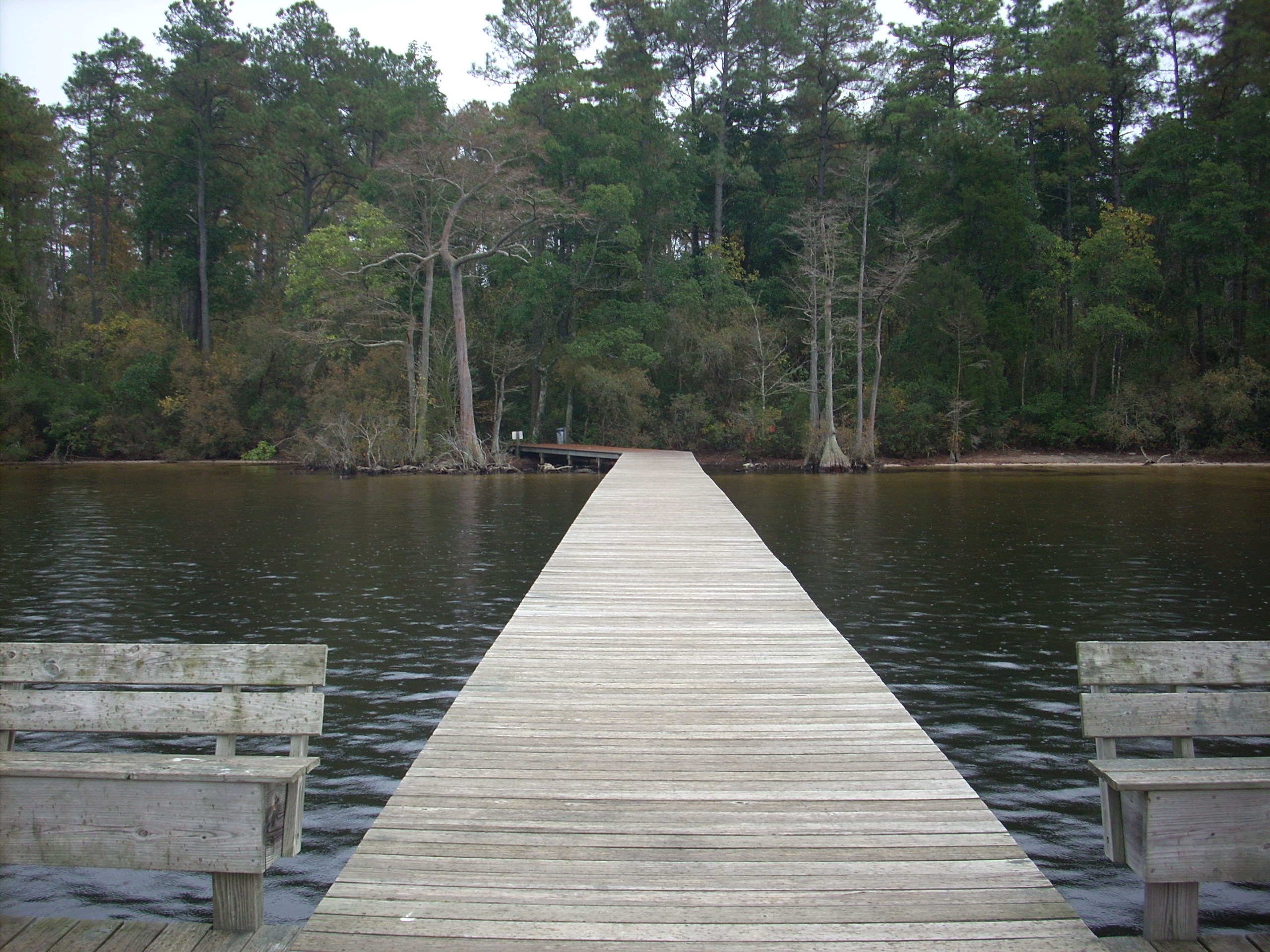
The fishing pier

Jones Lake is open to recreational fishing and boating. All boats must be under 10 horsepower (7.5 kW). Canoes and paddleboats are available to rent at the boathouse Memorial Day through Labor Day. The waters of the lake have a high acidity level due to the amount of vegetation that is decomposing and the buildup peat on the lake bottom. The acid levels have limited the numbers of fish that inhabit Jones Lake and recreation fishing is in turn limited. Yellow perch, chain pickerel, and catfish can be caught from the shore, pier and boats.

Bay Lake Trail is a four-mile (8.05 km) hiking trail around Jones Lake. It passes through the forests that surround the lake. Side trails lead to the lake where visitors can observe pond cypress trees that are covered in Spanish moss. Bay Lake Trail begins at the picnic area and ends at the campground. A one-mile (0.6 km) nature trail, the Cedar Loop Trail, passes through the bay forest and over a sand ridge.

Swimming and picnicking are the two most popular recreational activities at Jones Lake State Park. The large picnic area is near the swimming beach. There are picnic tables, grills and a large pavilion. The beach is open year round.
