= Deep River State Trail =

Water trail in North Carolina, US

Deep River Trail
- Location: North Carolina, United States
- Established: 2007
- Designation: State Trail (North Carolina)
- Trailheads: Jamestown, Cape Fear River
- Use: Hiking & Paddling
- Season: Year-round
- Maintainer: North Carolina Division of Parks and Recreation
- Website: https://trails.nc.gov/state-trails/deep-river-state-trail

Deep River State Trail is a unit of the North Carolina state park system in Chatham, Lee, Moore, Randolph and Guilford Counties, North Carolina in the United States, and it covers 1,277 acres (517 ha) along the Deep River. The State Trail is planned as a combination hiking trail and paddle trail along the Deep River, from Jamestown to its confluence with the Cape Fear River. The park and trail were established by the General Assembly on August 2, 2007. The first land acquisition for the park is known as the "Justice Lands", which are near Jordan Lake. No part of the park is currently developed, and no trail segments have yet been designated by the North Carolina Division of Parks and Recreation.
