= Rendezvous Mountain State Park =

State park in Wilkes County, North Carolina

Rendezvous Mountain
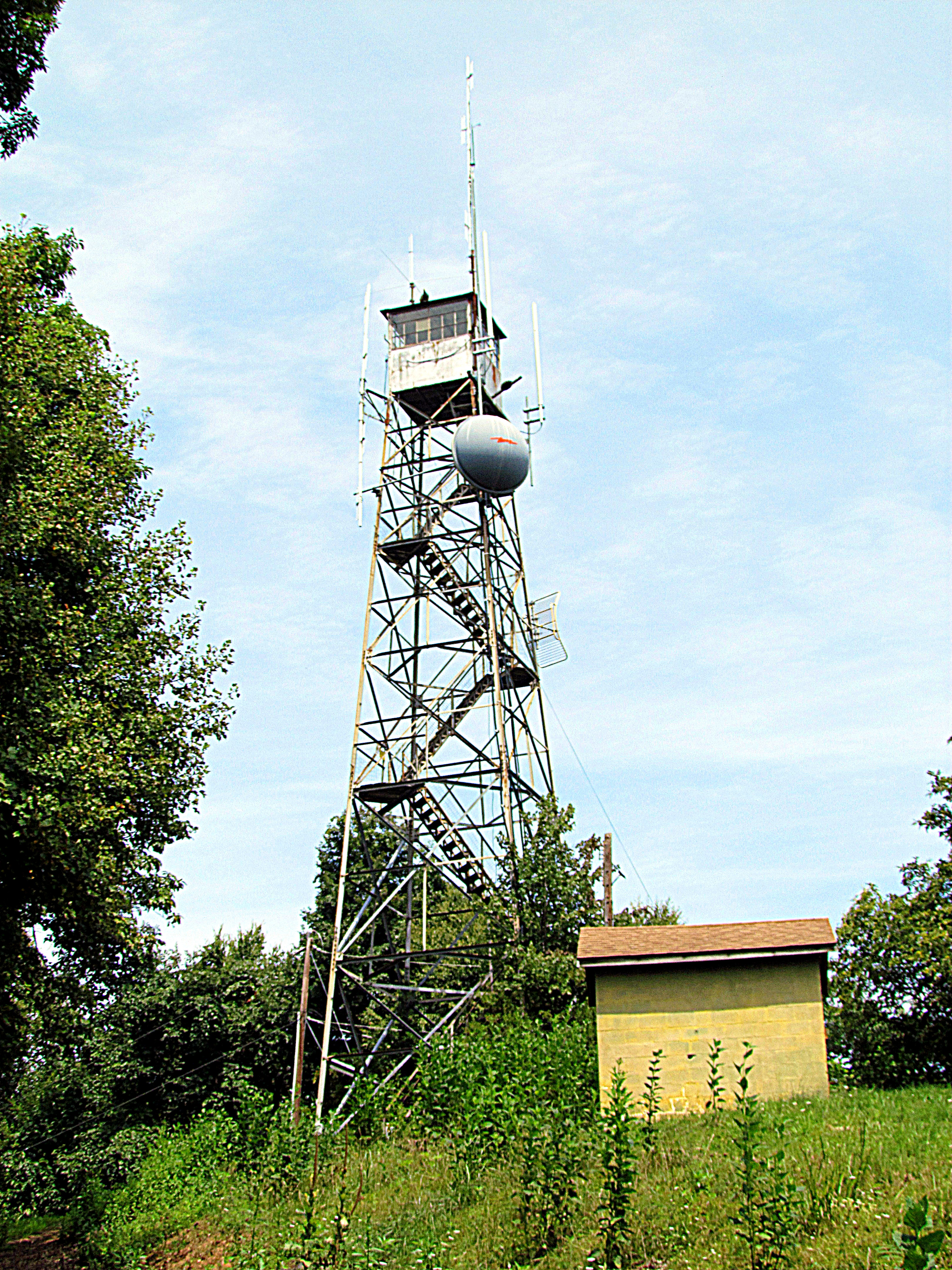
- Rendezvous Mountain Fire Tower

- Location within North Carolina Location within the United States
- Interactive map of Rendezvous Mountain
- Location: Wilkes County, North Carolina, United States
- Coordinates: 36°13′38″N 81°17′36″W
- Area: 1,800 acres (730 ha)
- Elevation: 2,412 ft (735 m)
- Established: 1926 (state park); 1984 (state educational forest); 2022 (state park)
- Administrator: North Carolina Division of Parks and Recreation
- Website: Official website

Rendezvous Mountain is a 1,800-acre (730 ha) North Carolina state park in Purlear, North Carolina. It was originally established as North Carolina's third state park. From 1984 to early 2022, the park was operated by the North Carolina Forest Service as Rendezvous Mountain Educational State Forest.

== History ==
Rendezvous Mountain is popularly rumored to have been an assembly point for the Overmountain Men during the Revolutionary War. Colonel Benjamin Cleveland is said to have called militiamen from around Wilkes County, by blowing a large ox horn from the mountain's summit. Cleveland was able to summon over 200 Patriots from the surrounding area to join him on a march to the Battle of Kings Mountain. The route they took is now commemorated by the nearby Overmountain Victory National Historic Trail.

In 1926, the park's original 146-acre (0.59 km^{2}) tract was donated to the state by Judge T. B. Finley of North Wilkesboro for inclusion in the State Park System; however, the unit was never opened to the public due to its small size, inaccessible location, and questionable historic significance.

The Civilian Conservation Corps constructed roads and trails around the mountain in the 1930s. They also built a cabin near the mountain's summit, which still remains.

The land was transferred to the Division of Forestry in 1956. It was later opened to the public in 1984 as an educational state forest. In the early 2000s, the forest was greatly expanded when large tracts along its western boundary became available. The state forest grew to a peak size of 3,316 acres (13.42 km^{2}).

The Appropriations Act of 2021 instructed the NC Forest Service to transfer a mutually agreed upon portion of Rendezvous Mountain Educational State Forest to the NC Division of Parks and Recreation by February 1, 2022. Since the forest was already split into two disconnected areas, it was agreed that the original tract and all adjoining tracts, which contained the forest's visitor facilities, would be managed as a state park. Meanwhile, the undeveloped, 1,500-acre (6.1 km^{2}) Little Fork tract would be retained by the Forest Service, and it would be leased to the North Carolina Wildlife Resources Commission as a public game land.
