= New River State Park =

State park in Ashe County, North Carolina

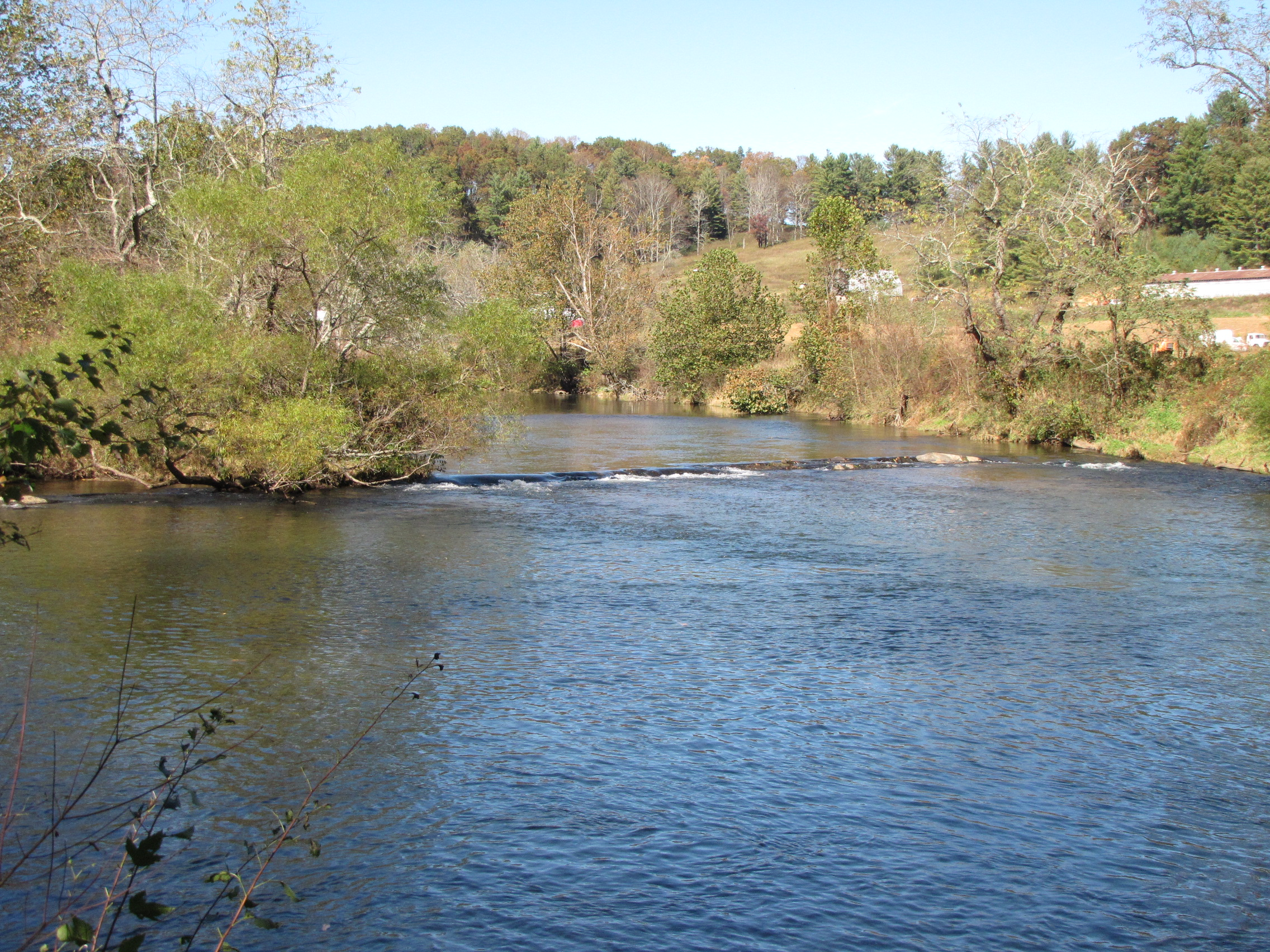

- Location within North Carolina Location within the United States
- Interactive map of New River State Park
- Location: Ashe County, North Carolina, United States
- Coordinates: 36°28′04″N 81°20′25″W
- Area: 3,323 acres (1,345 ha)
- Elevation: 2,716 ft (828 m)
- Established: 1976
- Administrator: North Carolina Division of Parks and Recreation
- Website: Official website

New River State Park is a North Carolina state park in Ashe County, North Carolina in the United States. Located near Jefferson, North Carolina, it covers 3,323 acres (13.45 km^{2}) in the protected New River watershed. The New River is one of the oldest rivers in the United States. It is considered by some geologists to be possibly one of the oldest rivers in the world, between 10 million and 360 million years old. New River State Park is open for year-round recreation, including canoeing, hiking, picnicking, fishing, camping and environmental education. The park is just off U.S. Route 221 in northwestern North Carolina.

== History ==
The New River is one of the oldest rivers in the United States and possibly in the world, with only the Nile River being older. The exact age of the river is impossible to pinpoint, but some geologists believe that it is between 10 million and 360 million years old. The river flows in a generally south-to-north course, which is against the southwest-to-northeast topology of the Appalachian Mountains and the west-to-east flow of most other nearby major rivers. This peculiarity may mean that the New River's formation preceded much of the surrounding landscape.

The river was named in 1651 by Edward Bland a cartographer in England made a map describing the western reaches of colonial Carolina and Virginia. The New River had not been placed on any preceding maps of the area, so Bland named it the "New River". The river was known as Woods River from 1654 until about 1754 for Colonel Abraham Wood at noted pioneer who traded with the native tribes in the area. It was renamed the New River by Peter Jefferson, father of the third President of the United States Thomas Jefferson when he led a surveying party through the mountains of western North Carolina. Apparently the river had again been left off a map so Jefferson named it the New River. The name Woods and New River were used interchangeably until about 1770, when the consensus name became what it is today, the New River.

Human activity along the New River at New River State Park has been traced back as far as 10,000 years ago. Archaeologists have found arrowheads, stone axes and pottery of the Kanawha, Cherokee, Shawnee and Creek tribes. The valley of the New River in what is now Ashe County was a hunting ground for all the tribes and was a major highway from north to south. The natives used both the river and various trails through the valley. Rock shelters along the river have been found, but there is little evidence pointing to any sort of permanent settlement by indigenous peoples.

Colonel Abraham Wood was the earliest European pioneer to reach what is now New River State Park. He arrived in 1654 and found a valley with virgin forests, open meadows and abundant wildlife including, black bear, bison, beaver, and elk. Permanent settlement did not take place until the 1770s when settlers began clearing the mountainous land for farming.

The area in and surrounding New River State Park was largely free of development until 1965 when the Appalachian Power Company applied for a license to build a dam across the New River for hydro-electric power. Local opposition to the project led to the formation of New River State Park in 1975. The North Carolina General Assembly declared that the New River from the confluence of Dog Creek to the Virginia state line was a State Scenic River. The same section of the river was named a National Wild and Scenic River by the United States Department of the Interior in 1976. The legislation of the North Carolina house and the United States Congress have preserved the river a natural state with prohibitions on the building of dams and reservoirs.

== Ecology ==
New River State Park is covered by a thriving second growth forest. The old growth forests were harvested for lumber and other wood products. The forests grow in fertile soil that supports a variety of hardwood trees, pine trees, shrubs and wildflowers. Hardwoods such as oak and hickory grow along the banks of the New River and on the lower slopes of the mountains. Carolina hemlock and various pines grow on the higher slopes. Shrubs found at New River State Park include dogwood, huckleberry, alders and sassafras.

New River State Park is home to fourteen threatened and endangered plants that grow in the valley along the New River. Carolina and Carey's saxifrage, rattlesnake root, spreading avens and purple sedge are protected and the picking of their flowers is prohibited.

Many animals that are commonly found in an eastern woodland environment can be found at New River State Park. White-tailed deer are a common sight. Black bear are seen less often. Mink, river otters, beavers, muskrats and raccoons inhabit the land along the banks of the New River.

Birds of many different species live at New River State Park. Osprey and red-tailed hawks are birds of prey that can be seen soaring above the park. Wild turkey live in the forested lowlands and ruffed grouse live on the mountain slopes. A wide variety of songbirds live throughout the forests. Wood ducks, spotted sandpipers and belted kingfishers live along the river banks.
