= Overmountain Victory National Historic Trail =

Park in the United States

Coordinates: 36.348720°N 82.210688°W

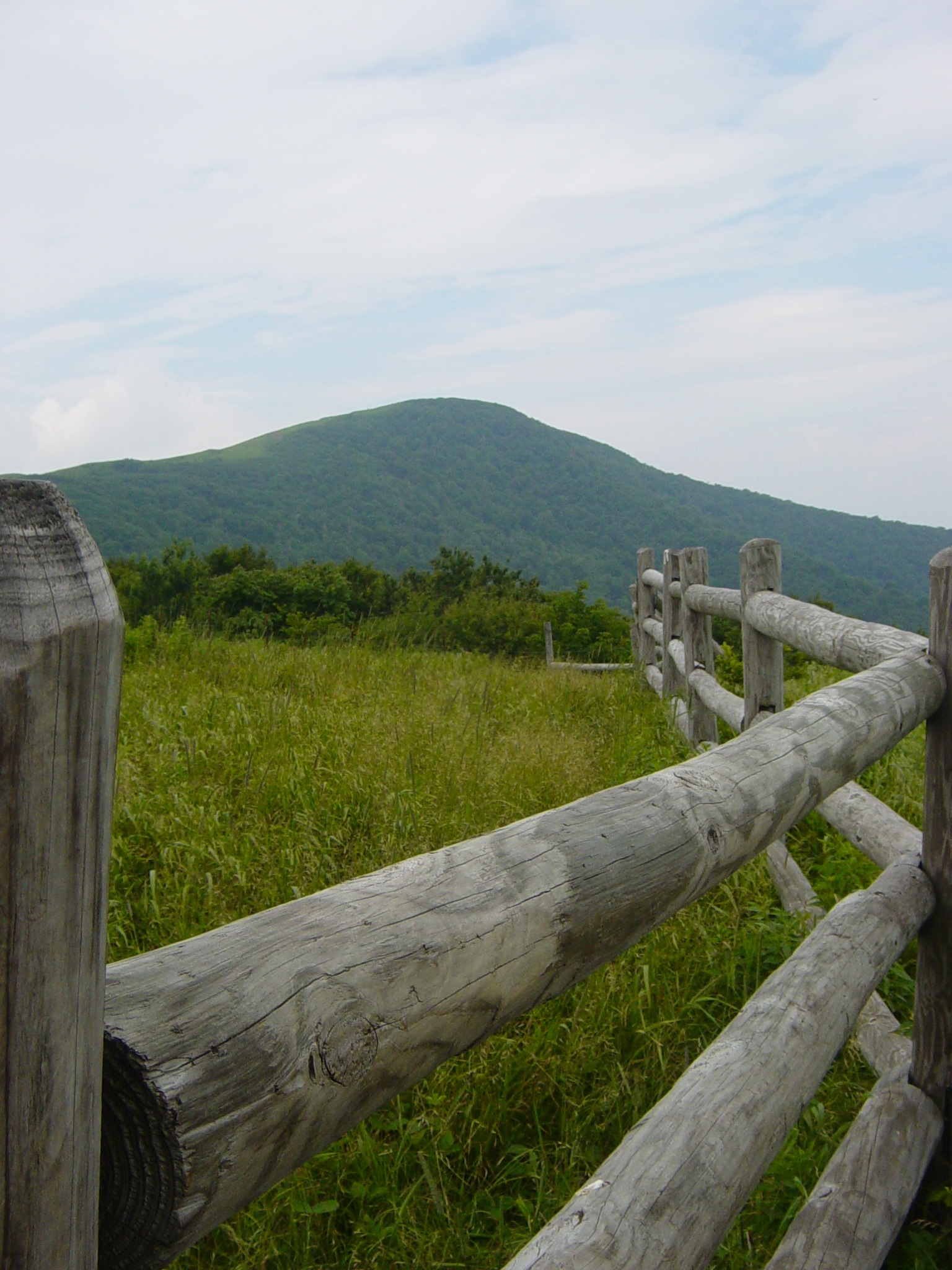
- Roan Mountain, the trail's highest point.
- Length: 214 mi (344 km)
- Location: Southeast United States
- Designation: National Historic Trail (1980); NC State Trail (2019)
- Trailheads: Elizabethton, Tennessee; Kings Mountain National Military Park
- Use: Hiking, Motor Route, Historical Reenactment
- Highest point: Roan Mountain
- Lowest point: Watauga River
- Months: late September to mid October
- Sights: Blue Ridge Mountains; Doe River; Fort Watauga
- Hazards: river crossing weather partial motor route
- Website: Overmountain Victory National Historic Trail

The Overmountain Victory National Historic Trail (OVHT) is part of the U.S. National Trails System, and N.C. State Trail System. It recognizes the Revolutionary War Overmountain Men, Patriots from what is now East Tennessee who crossed the Unaka Mountains and then fought in the Battle of Kings Mountain in South Carolina.

== Location ==
The OVHT follows the route from Abingdon, Virginia at the Abingdon Muster Grounds, fording the Watauga River at Sycamore Shoals through present day Elizabethton, Tennessee, crossing the Doe River twice near both Hampton, Tennessee and Roan Mountain, Tennessee, and ascending over the steep Unaka Mountains of Tennessee and North Carolina, on through South Carolina to the site of the Battle of Kings Mountain now within Kings Mountain National Military Park. The trail network consists of a 330-mile (530 km) corridor, including a 70-mile (110 km) branch from Elkin, North Carolina, that joins the main route at Morganton, North Carolina. In Rutherford County, North Carolina, the trail follows the approximate location of Rock Road through the Gilbert Town Historic District.

Fifty-seven miles (92 km) of OVHT are officially developed for public use, and development continues on the remaining sections. The official sections of the trail were established through agreements with current landowners and often have overlapping designations. All officially certified segments are identified through the use of signs displaying the trail logo (an Overmountain man in profile on a brown and white triangle) or a white triangular blaze.

A parallel Commemorative Motor Route travels along state highways and, in some stretches, actually travels over the old historic roadway.

The Overmountain Victory National Historic Trail is a cooperative effort of the National Park Service, the U.S. Forest Service, the U.S. Army Corps of Engineers, the Overmountain Victory Trail Association, the N.C. Division of Parks and Recreation, local governments, local citizens' associations, local historical societies and the states of Virginia, Tennessee, North Carolina, and South Carolina.

== History ==
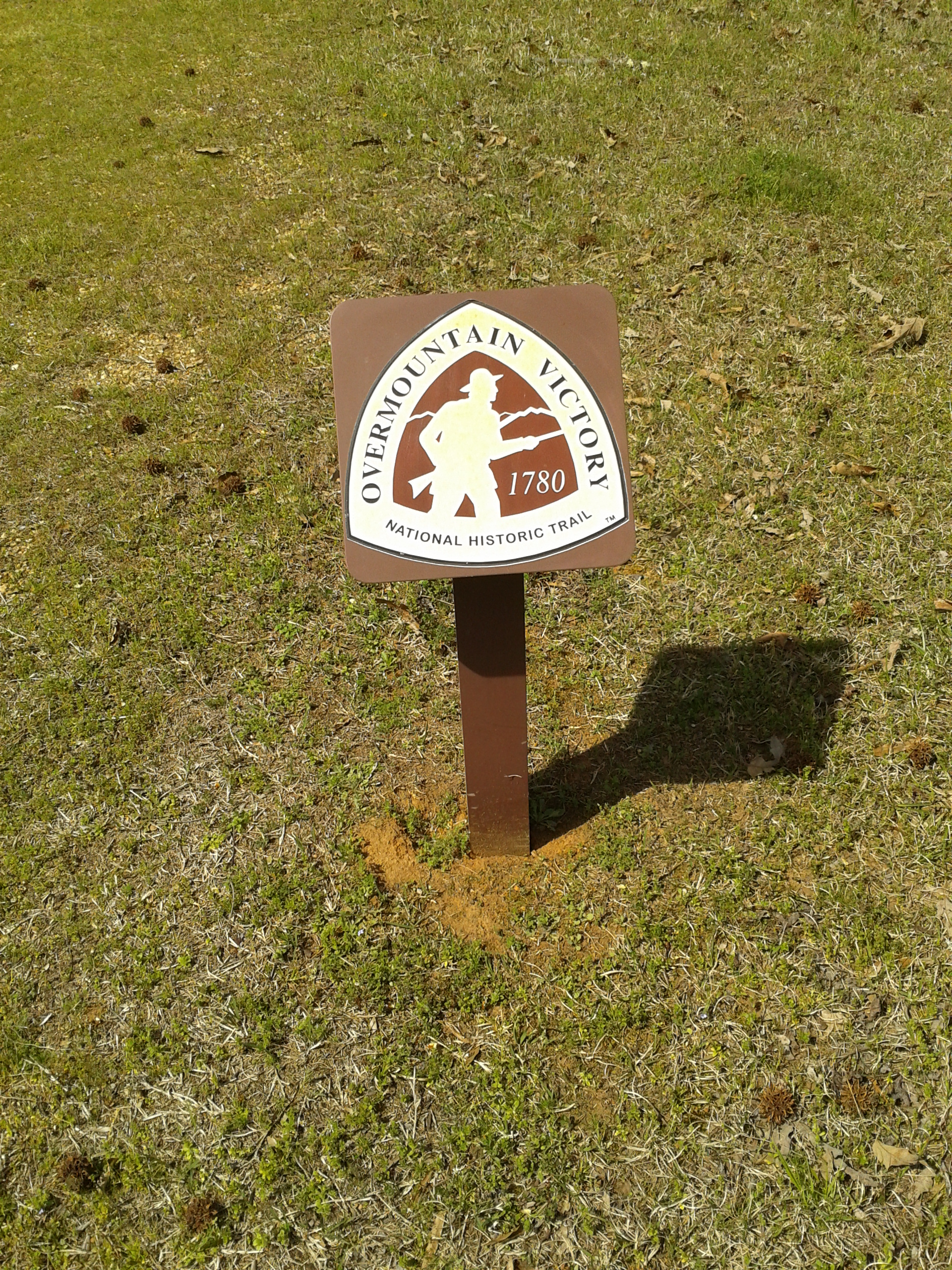
Overmountain Victory National Historic Trail maker at Cowpens National Battlefield, South Carolina

In anticipation of both the upcoming American Bicentennial of the Declaration of Independence in 1776 and the 1980 bicentennial of the Battle of King's Mountain, many citizens in the five states along the original routes—which included Georgia—reenacted and hiked along the segments of the Appalachian mountain trails and highways closely following the path of the actual 1780 march to the battle site located near present-day Kings Mountain, North Carolina, on the North Carolina-South Carolina border.

Hikers, military reenactors, and scouts have long followed the segments of the famous overmountain victory trail, and in 1975 three Elizabethton boy scouts were among those who completed the first re-enactment of the overmountain march (approximately 214 miles in one direction) from Elizabethton to King's Mountain and were met at a ceremony by U.S. Vice President Nelson Rockefeller at the Kings Mountain National Military Park near Blacksburg, South Carolina.

Many of these same OVT hikers, reenactors, and area citizens later sought federal recognition of the overmountain march to the Battle of King's Mountain as being analogous to the spontaneous response of the patriot Minutemen at Lexington and Concord during the American Revolutionary War.

OVT supporters worked with representatives of other American trails to create what became known as the National Trails System and later carried scrolls petitioning Congress for national designation of the OVT route. The Overmountain Victory National Historic Trail was officially designated as a national historic trail during September 1980 by federal legislation authorized by the U.S. Congress, and later in 1980, President Jimmy Carter—recognizing the historical significance of the frontier patriots marching over the Appalachian Mountains to defeat the Loyalist army at the Battle of King's Mountain—signed federal law designating the historical overmountain route as the Overmountain Victory National Historic Trail, the first National Historic Trail in the eastern United States, exactly 200 years after the event it commemorates.

In June 2019, the North Carolina General Assembly passed legislation which added the OVT's route within NC to the State Trail System. The enabling legislation directed the North Carolina Division of Parks and Recreation (NCDPR) to coordinate with the National Park Service on development of the trail within the state, and it gave NCDPR the authority to purchase or accept donations of land for the trail.

== See also ==
- Battle of Musgrove Mill
