= Hammocks Beach State Park =

State park in North Carolina, United States

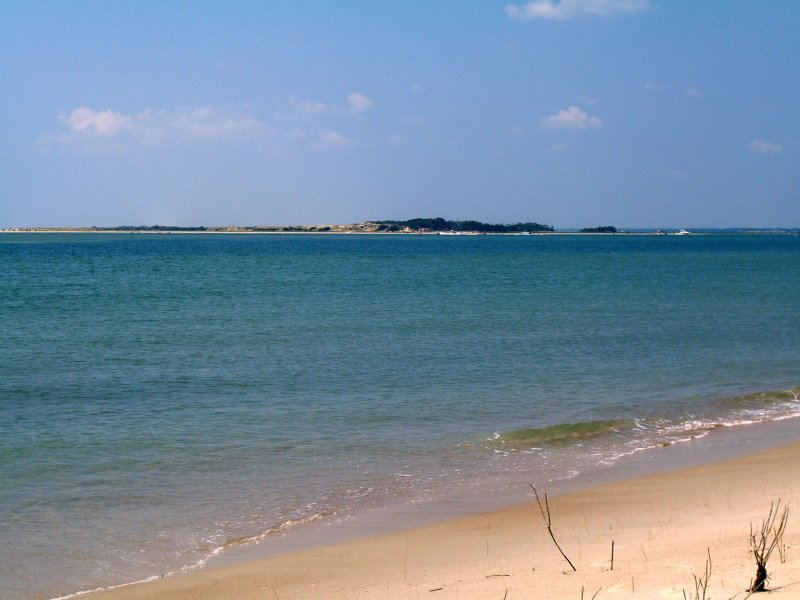
- Bear Island at Hammocks Beach State Park

- Location within North Carolina Location within the United States
- Interactive map of Hammocks Beach State Park
- Location: Onslow County, North Carolina, United States
- Coordinates: 34°40′16″N 77°08′34″W
- Area: 1,611 acres (652 ha)
- Elevation: 0 ft (0 m)
- Established: 1961
- Administrator: North Carolina Division of Parks and Recreation
- Website: Official website

U.S. National Natural Landmark
- Designated: 1980

Hammocks Beach State Park is a North Carolina state park in Onslow County, North Carolina in the United States. Located near Swansboro, along the Southern Outer Banks, or Crystal Coast, the state park covers 1,611 acres (6.52 km^{2}) and consists mainly of Bear Island. The park also owns three smaller islands, Dudley, Huggins and Jones, located in the nearby mouth of the White Oak River. These islands can be reached by paddling with kayaks or canoes.

== Bear Island ==
Bear Island is four miles long with a south-facing beach. It is characterized by an extensive dune system, a pocket of maritime forest, and a shrub thicket and marsh on the northern sound side, of the island. It is popular with daytrippers, boaters, kayakers and campers. While it serves a recreational function, with a new bathhouse and primitive camping sites, the vast majority of the island is wild and undisturbed. Most of the animals on Bear Island flew or swam through tidal creeks and marshes to make their home on the island. Fresh water is scarce and only found in a few ponds in the forest between some dunes. Recent hurricanes have had a considerable impact on the oceanfront beach/dune system.

A ferry service runs from the Hammocks Beach State Park headquarters on the mainland to Bear Island via Cow Channel. While the ride, which some 200,000 people a year take, is only 15 minutes long, it is narrow and winding. The channel has increasingly become more difficult to navigate at low tide since 1996 due to sand migration in the estuary and a series of hurricanes. Shoaling in the channel has been constant since ferry operations began in the early 1960s and has worsened in recent years due to hurricane activity, particularly in the half-mile stretch of the channel nearest the island. During low tides, the park has used 11-passenger skiffs to ferry passengers rather than its 40-foot (12 m), 28-passenger boats. The ferry service was temporarily curtailed in 2002 because at low tide, the water was "extremely low" in a 200-foot (61 m) section of the channel. It was shut down completely for several months in early 2007 for an emergency dredging project in the channel route to the island. As of 2009 Hammocks Beach State Park now offers a ferry that can hold up to 49 passengers.

In 1980, Bear Island was designated as a National Natural Landmark by the National Park Service.

== Huggins Island ==
Kayakers in front of Huggins Island.

Nearby Huggins Island, which sits just inland from Bear Island between it and the mainland, largely consists of a 110-acre (0.45 km^{2}) thick maritime forest with many large live oak trees. The island is mostly flat with no sand dunes and is about a quarter of the size of Bear Island. At the western end of the island, from which the town of Swansboro can be seen, is a large marsh. Huggins Island is only accessible by private boat, and there are no facilities, and camping is not permitted on this island.

An even smaller island near Huggins is known in the area for its collection of sharks teeth, which wash in with the tide on the eastern tip, giving it the name Sharks Tooth Island, but it is not part of Hammocks Beach State Park. Huggins Island became a part of Hammocks Beach State Park in 2000.

== Jones Island ==
Jones Island lies seven miles northeast of Bear Island at the mouth of White Oak River. Prominently situated in the middle of the river about a mile off the town of Swansboro, Jones Island is the dominant landmass in the Lower White Oak. It is characterized by low upland rises at the southeast and northwest ends and its marshes and small ponds along its eastern shore. The northwestern third of the island supports coastal fringe evergreen forest, which is considered to be a rare coastal ecosystem type. Loblolly pine and live oak trees are prominent on the property and eastern painted bunting have been seen nesting on the island. Breeding populations of this sparrow-sized member of the finch family are rare in North Carolina. In October 2007, 17 acres (0.069 km^{2}) of the island permanently became part of Hammocks Beach State Park. The island, which is considered a regionally significant natural heritage area, was zoned for residential development and will now be protected for years to come.

== Dudley Island ==
Dudley Island is located between Bear Island and Huggins Island. The island was offered to the state as a donation that will be completed in phases over a three-year period. The state accepted the first phase of the donation in December 2015.

== History ==
Dugout canoes once traveled the vast coastal waterways as woodland Native Americans journeyed between the mainland and surrounding islands. These Native Americans participated in the Tuscarora wars against colonists in 1711 and 1713. Hostilities continued from hideouts around Bear Island until the middle of the 18th century when the Native Americans migrated northward. Dugout canoes soon gave way to pirate ships. The inlets along the coast and the shallow waterways behind the barrier islands were havens for pirates. Here they could prey upon merchant vessels and hide while repairing their ships. Among the pirates who frequented the area was the notorious Blackbeard. Spanish privateers also terrorized the colonists. For protection, the colonists built several forts, including one near Bear Inlet, which was erected in 1749 and has since disappeared.

Due to its location, Bear Island and Huggins Island have often played a role in the protection of the mainland. During the Civil War, Confederate troops on Bear Island defended it against Union forces occupying Bogue Banks. The island again assumed military importance nearly a century later when, during World War II, the Coast Guard used it to secure the coast and monitor German U-boat activity. Huggins Island also featured in the Civil War. Confederate Brigadier General Walter Gwynn, in charge of coastal defenses from New Bern to the South Carolina line, working with North Carolina Adjutant General Richard Gatlin, proposed to erect a six-gun battery on the southern tip of Huggins Island to protect Bogue Inlet. Construction of the fort was completed in December 1861 with labor supplied by local slaves working alongside the troops detailed for that purpose. Captain Daniel Munn's company was then stationed at the fort to man the cannons for one year. They were then ordered to join General Lawrence Branch's Brigade at New Bern and took the cannons with them as they marched out of Swansboro. Several of the cannons were captured by Union troops during the Battle of New Bern on March 14, 1862. On August 19, a Union force commanded by Colonel Thomas G. Stevenson of the 24th Massachusetts Volunteer Infantry made a reconnaissance to Swansboro. During the expedition the fort at Huggins’ Island was burned, the barracks and ammunition magazine collapsing into ashes. Only the earthen embankment remains as evidence of the fort's existence. Those earthworks, however, have dodged development and erosion, and are now the only unspoiled example of Confederate earthwork fortifications surviving on the North Carolina coast.

Early in the 20th century, Dr. William Sharpe, a neurosurgeon of New York, came to Bear Island to hunt. His love of the island prompted him to acquire it for his retirement. Sharpe intended to will the property to John Hurst, his longtime hunting guide and friend, but Hurst persuaded him to donate it to the North Carolina Teachers Association, an organization of African American teachers. In 1950, the group assumed the deed to Bear Island and attempted to develop the property. Limited funds and the island's remoteness rendered their efforts unsuccessful. In 1961, the association donated the island to the state of North Carolina for a park. Initially planned as a park for minorities, Hammocks Beach State Park opened for all people following the Civil Rights Act of 1964.

A deal completed in 2015 saw 199 acres (81 ha) acres on the mainland added to the park with an additional 90 to be added over the following three years.

Preceded by Emerald Isle	Beaches of Southeastern North Carolina	Succeeded by Onslow Beach
