= Mount Jefferson (North Carolina) =

Mountain in North Carolina, United States

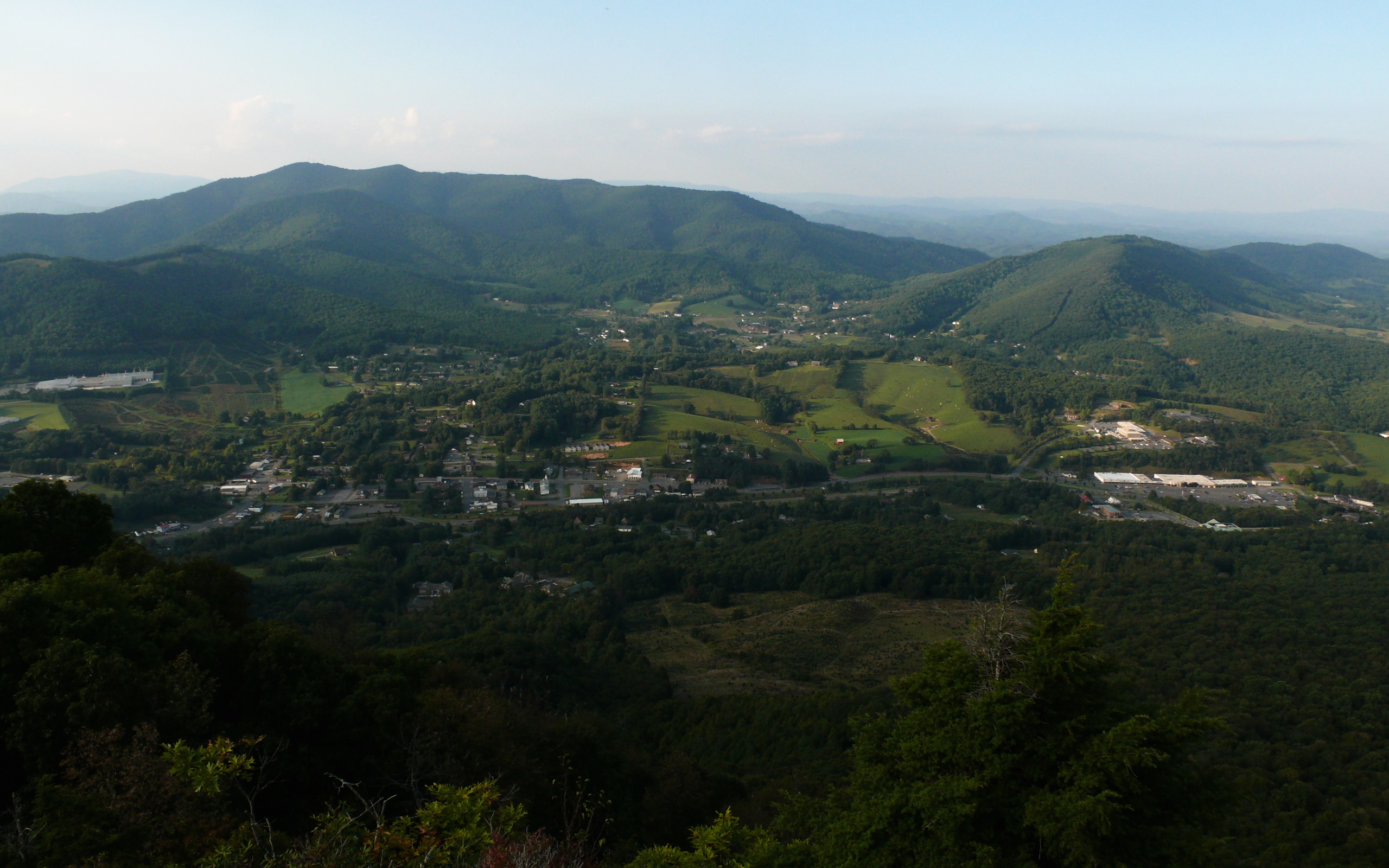
- Looking north across the town of Jefferson and the southern flank of Phoenix Mountain, as seen from the upper overlook at Mount Jefferson State Natural Area

Highest point
- Elevation: 4,664 ft (1,422 m)
- Coordinates: 36°24′11″N 81°27′48″W

Geography
- Location: Ashe County, North Carolina, U.S.
- Topo map: USGS Jefferson

Climbing
- Easiest route: Drive, hike

Mount Jefferson is a mountain located in Ashe County, North Carolina. The mountain is part of the Mount Jefferson State Natural Area. It has an elevation of 4,665 feet (1,422 m) above sea level and rises sharply more than 1,600 feet above the towns of Jefferson, North Carolina and West Jefferson. The mountain lies along the drainage divide between the north and south forks of the New River.

A paved road leads to the mountain's summit. On a clear day, the summit affords sweeping views of the surrounding countryside; the towns of Jefferson and West Jefferson; and the Appalachian Mountains in Virginia, Tennessee, and North Carolina.

The mountain has a secondary peak at the eastern end of its ridge, marked as Luther Rock on trail maps and as Luther Overlook on USGS maps.

== History ==
Before the American Civil War, the mountain was a popular hiding place for enslaved people who had escaped from their captors in the central and eastern North Carolina. As a result, legend has it, the peak was named "Nigger Mountain." According to another source, the name referred to the mountain's black granite coloration. The mountain was later renamed "Mount Jefferson" after the town at its base.

== Geology ==
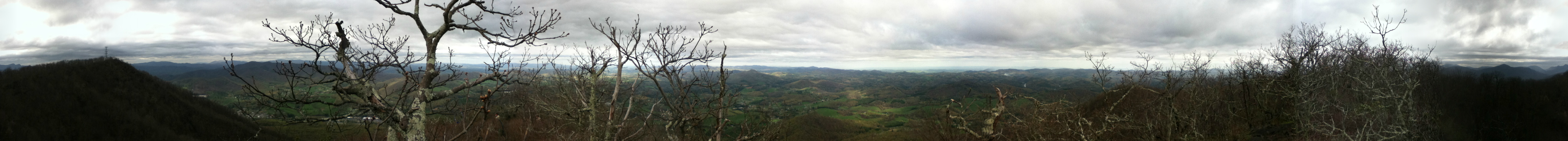
Panorama from Luther Rock Peak of Mount Jefferson, North Carolina.

[from Luther Rock Peak of Mount Jefferson, North Carolina.] Mount Jefferson is part of the Ashe Metamorphic Suite, a large province of metamorphic rock that formed during the opening and closing of a large sea between the Cambrian and Ordovician periods.

=== Metamorphic Foundation ===
Mount Jefferson's foundation consists of rocks formed when preexisting sediments and volcanic or igneous materials were subjected to heat and pressure during mountain-building events that shaped the Appalachian Mountains. Rocks within the metamorphic foundation display foliation, which is the alignment of minerals into layers or bands. This foliation provides evidence of the geological history of the Blue Ridge Mountains, such as episodes of deformation, burial, heating, and uplift. Minerals, due to the tremendous amount of metamorphic pressure, recrystallize into rocks such as schist and gneiss.The mountain itself is composed primarily of black amphibolite gneiss, which gives it its aforementioned dark color. Metagraywacke and schist are also present on the mountain.

==== Effects on Mount Jefferson ====
Metamorphic rock both preserves the history of Mount Jefferson and helps determine its present-day landscape. Foliation and fractures in the metamorphosed rock affect how the mountain weathers. Water enters the cracks and moves along planes where minerals are aligned, gradually breaking down the rock. As a result, the same structures that record the mountain's tectonic history can influence the formation of cliffs, slopes, soil, and drainage patterns. This strong foundation helps the mountain resist erosion.

=== Vascular Flora and Environmental Habitat ===
Due to the higher concentration of mafic minerals, the soil on the mountain has a higher pH than average. Soils formed from weathered metamorphic rock can be relatively rich in minerals such as calcium, magnesium, and iron, creating favorable conditions for many vascular plants. These mineral-rich soils, combined with the filtration properties of the permeable rock, elevation, sunlight, moisture, and weathering, help support diverse plant environments. The Mount Jefferson State Natural Area and nearby areas in Ashe County, North Carolina have 706 plant taxa from 109 families documented.

==== Featured Plant Species - High Elevation Mafic Glade ====
The High Elevation Mafic Glade is a rare, open plant community that develops at high elevations on exposed mafic rock, such as the rock that forms the foundation. The High-Elevation Mafic Glade supports a specialized mixture of lichens, herbs, grasses, and small woody plants. The glade also supports species that have adapted to shallow soils, rock crevices, strong sunlight at high elevations, and variable moisture levels of the mountain.

== See also ==
- Mount Jefferson State Natural Area
