= Singletary =

Singletary may refer to:

== People ==
- Amos Singletary (1721–1806), American mill operator and lawyer, representative of Massachusetts General Court
- Clarence E. Singletary (1918–2015), American judge and politician
- Daryle Singletary (1971–2018), American country music singer
- Devin Singletary (born 1997), American football player
- Donovan Singletary, American operatic bass-baritone
- Mike Singletary (born 1958), former American football player, and former head coach of the San Francisco 49ers
- Otis A. Singletary (1921–2003), historian and university administrator
- Sean Singletary (born 1985), American professional basketball player
- Sterling Singletary, (1996–2025), season 4 cast member on Fetch! with Ruff Ruffman
- Tony Singletary, American television director

== Places ==
- Singletary Center for the Arts in Lexington, Kentucky
- Singletary Lake in North Carolina
- Singletary Lake State Park
