= Bethel Township, Bladen County, North Carolina =

Coordinates: 34.65797°N 78.74276°W

- Township
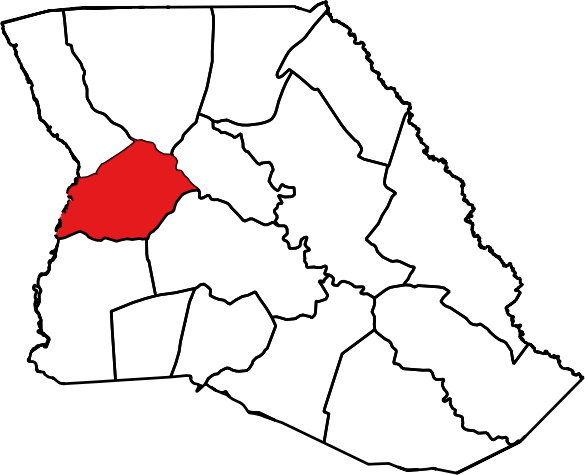
- Location of Bethel Township in Bladen County

- Location of Bladen County in North Carolina
- Country: United States
- State: North Carolina
- County: Bladen

Area
  - Total: 43.33 sq mi (112.22 km^{2})
- Highest elevation (south of Dublin, North Carolina): 150 ft (46 m)
- Lowest elevation (Bakers Creek): 43 ft (13 m)

Population (2010)
  - Total: 4,467
  - Density: 106.35/sq mi (41.06/km^{2})
- Time zone: UTC-4 (EST)
  - Summer (DST): UTC-5 (EDT)
- Area codes: 910, 472

Bethel Township is one of fifteen townships in Bladen County, North Carolina. At the 2010 census, the population of the township was 4,467.

== Geography ==
Bethel Township is 43.33 square miles (112.2 km^{2}) in size and is located in western Bladen County. The town of Dublin is within Bethel Township.

The west side of Bethel Township is drained by Black Swamp, Reedy Meadow Swamp, and Bear Ford Swamp which drain to the Lumber River. The east side is drained by Bakers Creek, a tributary of the Cape Fear River.
