= Frenches Creek Township, Bladen County, North Carolina =

Township in North Carolina, United States

Coordinates: 34.48°N 78.31°W

Frenches Creek Township
- Township
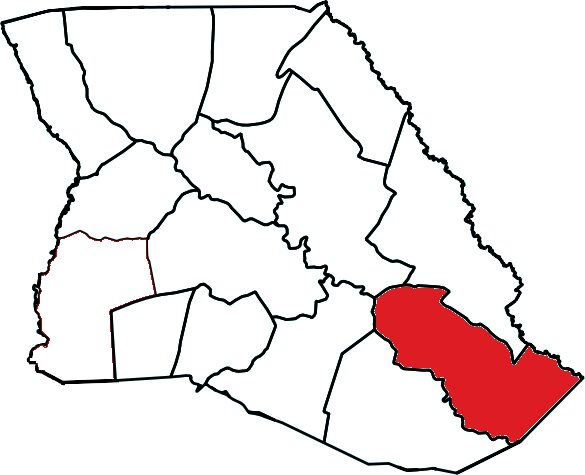
- Location of Frenches Creek Township within Bladen County

- Location of Bladen County within North Carolina
- Country: United States
- State: North Carolina
- County: Bladen

Area
  - Total: 78.60 sq mi (203.6 km^{2})
- Highest elevation (NC 210 near Colly): 64 ft (20 m)
- Lowest elevation (vicinity of the Black River): 10 ft (3.0 m)

Population
  - Estimate (2022): 579
  - Density: 7.4/sq mi (2.9/km^{2})
- Time zone: UTC-5 (EST)
  - Summer (DST): UTC-4 (EDT)
- Area codes: 910, 472

Frenches Creek Township is a township in Bladen County, North Carolina, United States.

== Geography and population ==
Frenches Creek Township is one of 15 townships within Bladen County. It is 78.60 square miles (203.6 km^{2}) in total area, and is located in the southeastern portion of the county.

In 2022, the estimated population of the township was 579. Communities within Frenches Creek Township include Colly and Kelly.

Frenches Creek Township is bordered to the east by Pender County, and to the southeast by Columbus County. The Black River forms part of the township's eastern border.

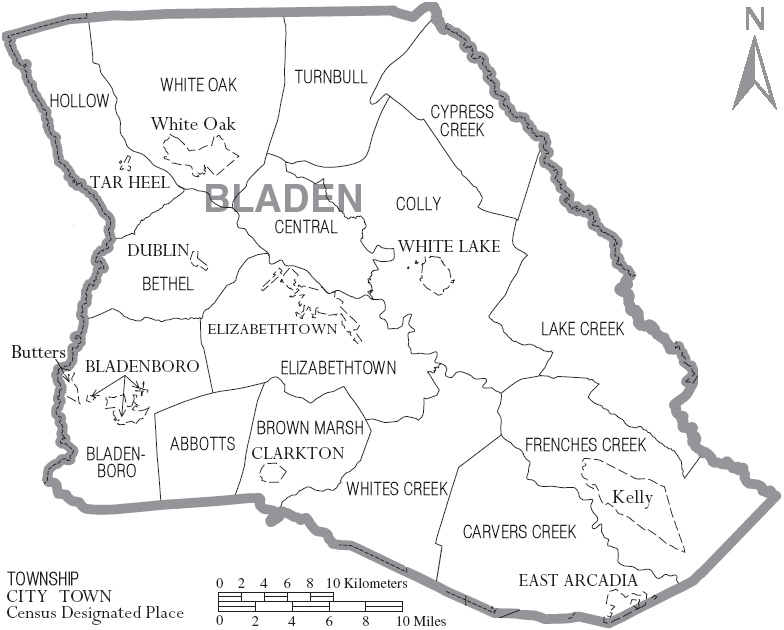
Map of Bladen County with municipal and township labels
