= Bladenboro Township, Bladen County, North Carolina =

Township in North Carolina, United States

Bladenboro Township
- Township
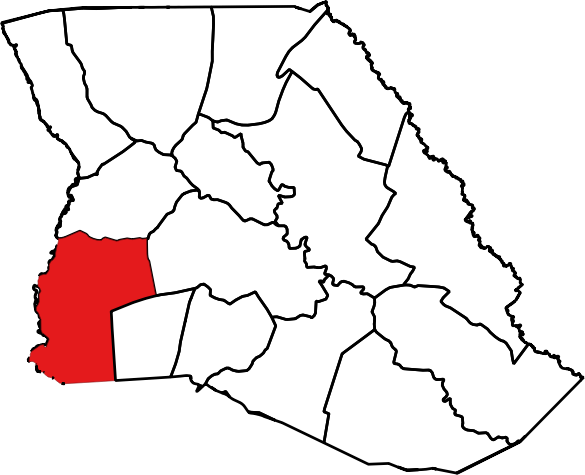
- Location of Bladenboro Township within Bladen County

- Location of Bladen County within North Carolina
- Country: United States
- State: North Carolina
- County: Bladen

Area
  - Total: 63.80 sq mi (165.23 km^{2})
- Highest elevation (northwest of Bladenboro, North Carolina): 133 ft (41 m)
- Lowest elevation (Horsepen Branch): 84 ft (26 m)

Population (2010)
  - Total: 6,009
  - Density: 94.2/sq mi (36.4/km^{2})
- Time zone: UTC-4 (EST)
  - Summer (DST): UTC-5 (EDT)
- Area codes: 910, 472

Bladenboro Township is a township in Bladen County, North Carolina, United States.

== Geography and population ==
Bladenboro Township contains the tributaries of Big Swamp, and include Bryant Swamp and Horsepen Branch. These streams are part of the larger Lumber River basin.

It is one of 15 townships within the county. Bladenboro Township is 63.79 square miles (165.2 km^{2}) in size, and is located in southwestern Bladen County.

At the 2010 census, the population of Bladenboro Township was 6,009. In 2022, the estimated population of the township was 5,706.

Communities within the township include Bladenboro and Butters.
