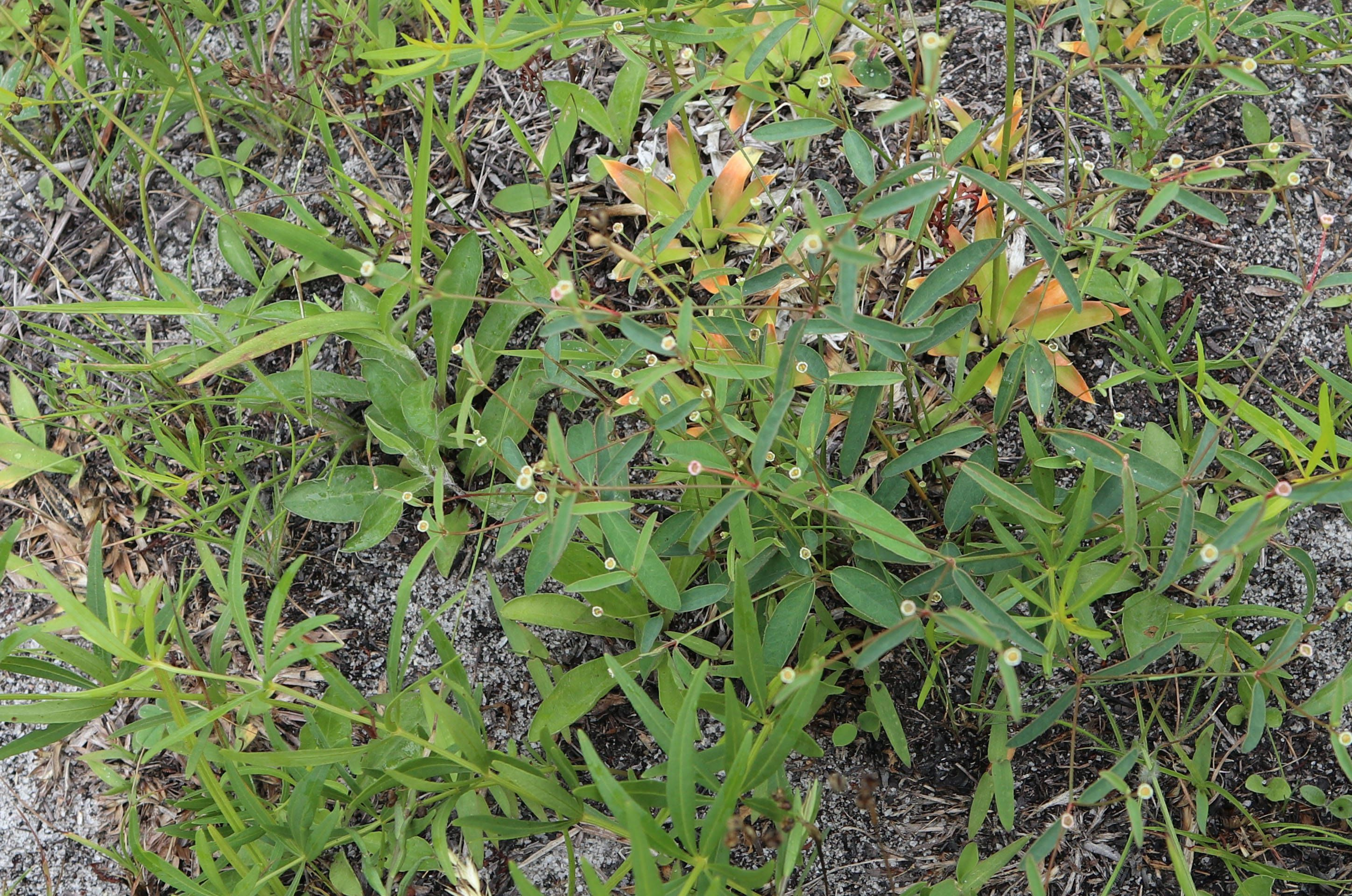

Scientific classification
- Kingdom: Plantae
- Clade: Tracheophytes
- Clade: Angiosperms
- Clade: Eudicots
- Clade: Rosids
- Order: Malpighiales
- Family: Euphorbiaceae
- Genus: Euphorbia
- Species: E. curtisii

Binomial name
- Euphorbia curtisii Engelm. (1860)

Synonyms
- Agaloma curtisii (Engelm.) Nieuwl. (1912); Agaloma eriogonoides (Small) Nieuwl. (1912); Euphorbia curtisii var. longipes Boiss. (1862); Euphorbia eriogonoides Small (1898); Euphorbia ruegeliana Shuttlew. ex Boiss. (1862); Tithymalopsis curtisii (Engelm.) Small (1903); Tithymalopsis eriogonoides (Small) Small (1903)

= Euphorbia curtisii =

Curtis' spurge

Species of plant

Euphorbia curtisii, known by the common names of Curtis' spurge and sandhills spurge, is a member of the spurge family, Euphorbiaceae. It is a perennial herb, native to the southeastern United States, from the southern coast of Alabama to central North Carolina.

== Description ==
Euphorbia curtisii closely resembles Euphorbia ipecacuanhae. The stems are stiffly upright and extensively branched. Lower branches are arranged alternately, while the upper branches are opposite. The lower leaves are mostly bract-like and alternate, whereas the upper leaves are opposite, linear, lanceolate, or oblong in shape. They may be either glabrous or pubescent, measuring 1–6 cm in length and 0.5–1.5 mm in width, with petioles ranging from 0.5–5 mm long. Peduncles measure 0.3–2 cm in length. The cyathia are either glabrous or pubescent and span 1.5–3 mm across. The petaloid appendages of the glands are white or pale pink, measuring 0.8–1.3 mm in length and 1–1.5 mm in width. Capsules may be sparsely pubescent or glabrous, 2.5–3 mm long, with pedicels extending less than 1 mm beyond the cyathia. The seeds are gray, mottled with reddish-brown, and measure 1.8–2 mm in length.

== Habitat ==
E. curtisii is found in longleaf pinelands and savannas and wet pine flatwoods, as well as in human-disturbed areas in the edges of flatwoods and along roadsides.
