= Colly, North Carolina =

Unincorporated community in North Carolina, US

Colly
- Unincorporated community
- Location within the state of North Carolina
- Coordinates: 34.46°N 78.26°W
- Country: United States
- State: North Carolina
- County: Bladen
- Time zone: UTC-5 (EST)
  - Summer (DST): UTC-4 (EDT)
- ZIP Code: 28448
- Area codes: 910, 472

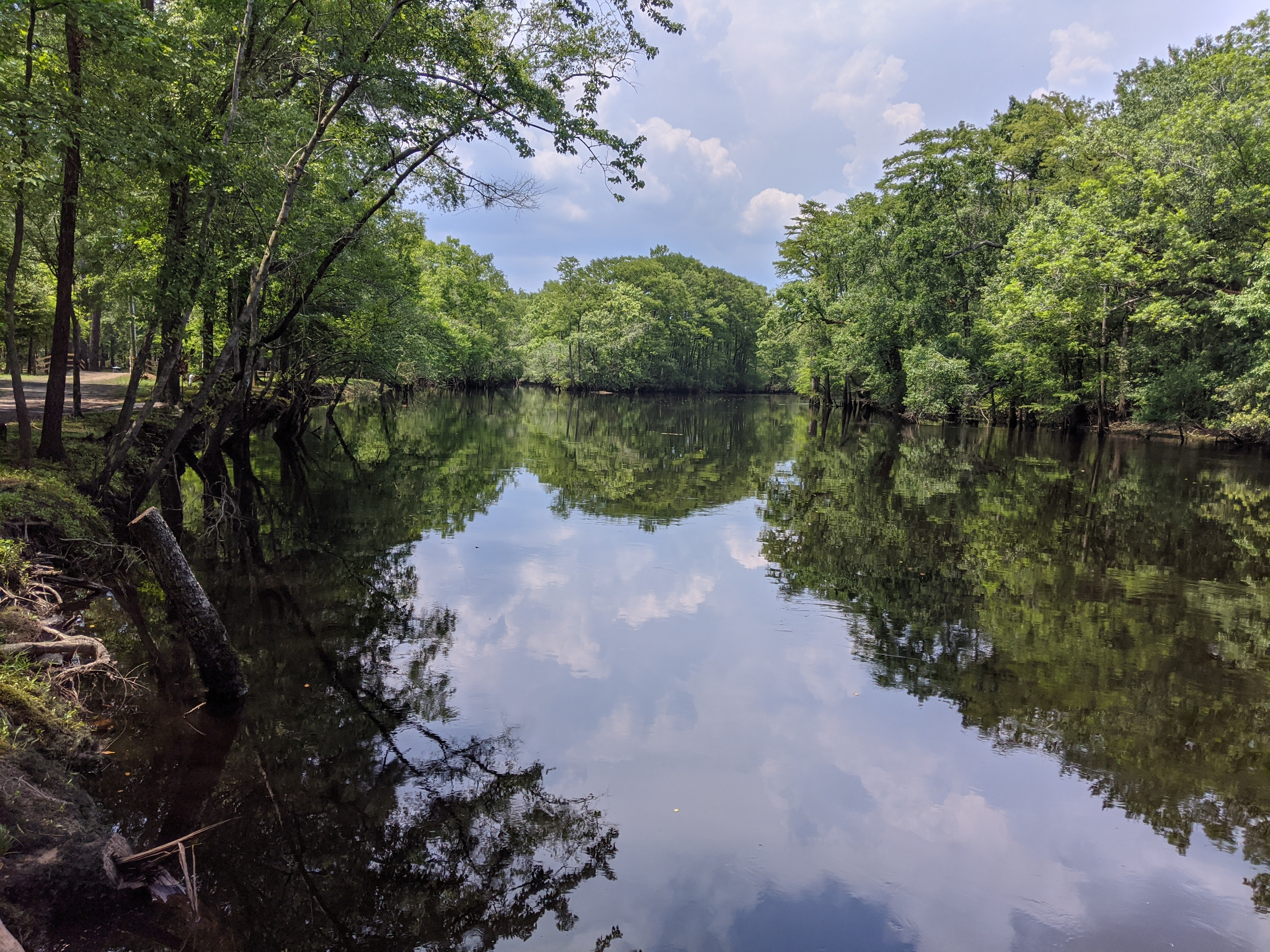
The Black River, near Colly

Colly is an unincorporated community in Bladen County, North Carolina, United States.

== Geography ==
Colly is located in southeastern Bladen County. It is located east of Kelly and is within the Frenches Creek Township.

The ZIP Code for Colly is 28448.

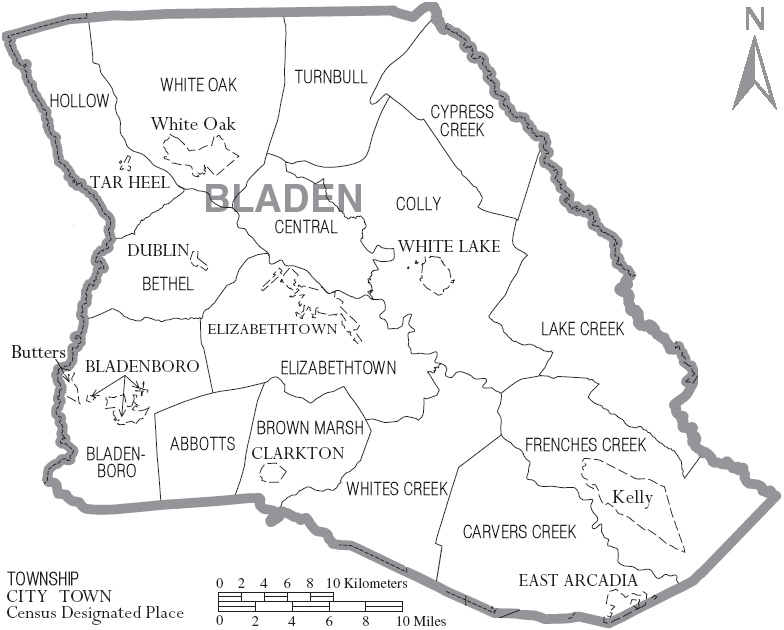
Map of Bladen County with municipal and township labels
