= American ipecac =

American ipecac may refer to several plant species:

- Euphorbia ipecacuanhae; also known as Carolina ipecac
- Gillenia stipulata
