= Bakers Creek (Cape Fear River tributary) =

Stream in North Carolina, USA

Bakers Creek Tributary to Cape Fear River
- Location of Bakers Creek mouth Bakers Creek (Cape Fear River tributary) (the United States)

Location
- Country: United States
- State: North Carolina
- County: Bladen

Physical characteristics
- Source: Bear Ford Swamp divide
  - location: Dublin, North Carolina
  - coordinates: 34°39′52″N 078°42′46″W
  - elevation: 126 ft (38 m)
- Mouth: Cape Fear River
  - location: about 1 mile south of Yorick, North Carolina
  - coordinates: 34°39′19″N 078°35′21″W
  - elevation: 24 ft (7.3 m)
- Length: 4.81 mi (7.74 km)
- Basin size: 9.03 square miles (23.4 km^{2})
- Discharge
  - location: Cape Fear River
  - average: 10.31 cu ft/s (0.292 m^{3}/s) at mouth with Cape Fear River

Basin features
- Progression: Cape Fear River → Atlantic Ocean
- River system: Cape Fear River
- Tributaries
  - left: Bomill Branch
  - right: unnamed tributaries
- Bridges: McDaniel Lane, Lyon Landing Road, Rice Pond Road, Owen Hill Road

Bakers Creek is a 4.81 mi (7.74 km) long 3rd order tributary to the Cape Fear River in Bladen County, North Carolina.

== Course ==
Bakers Creek rises in Dublin, North Carolina on the Bear Ford Swamp divide and then flows southeast to join the Cape Fear River about 1 mile southwest of Yorick, North Carolina.

== Watershed ==
Baker Creek drains 9.03 square miles (23.4 km^{2}) of area, receives about 49.1 in/year of precipitation, has a wetness index of 518.97 and is about 21% forested.

== See also ==
- List of rivers of North Carolina

== Additional Maps ==
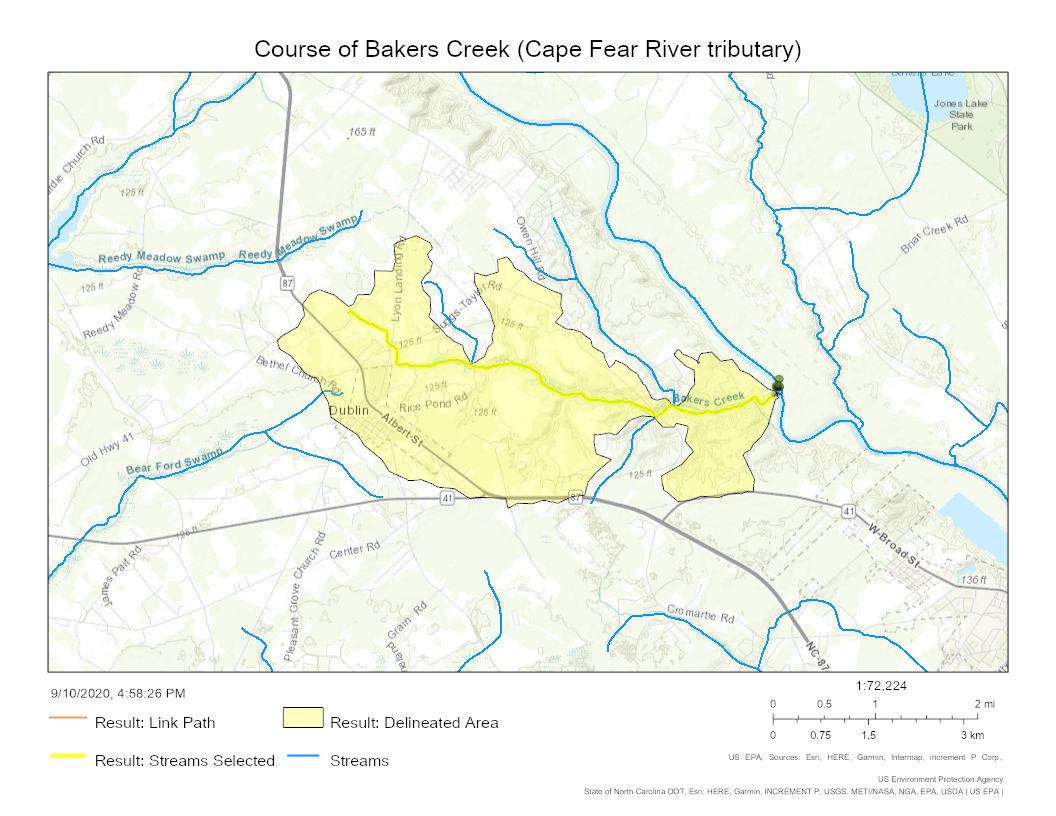
Course of Bakers Creek (Cape Fear River tributary)

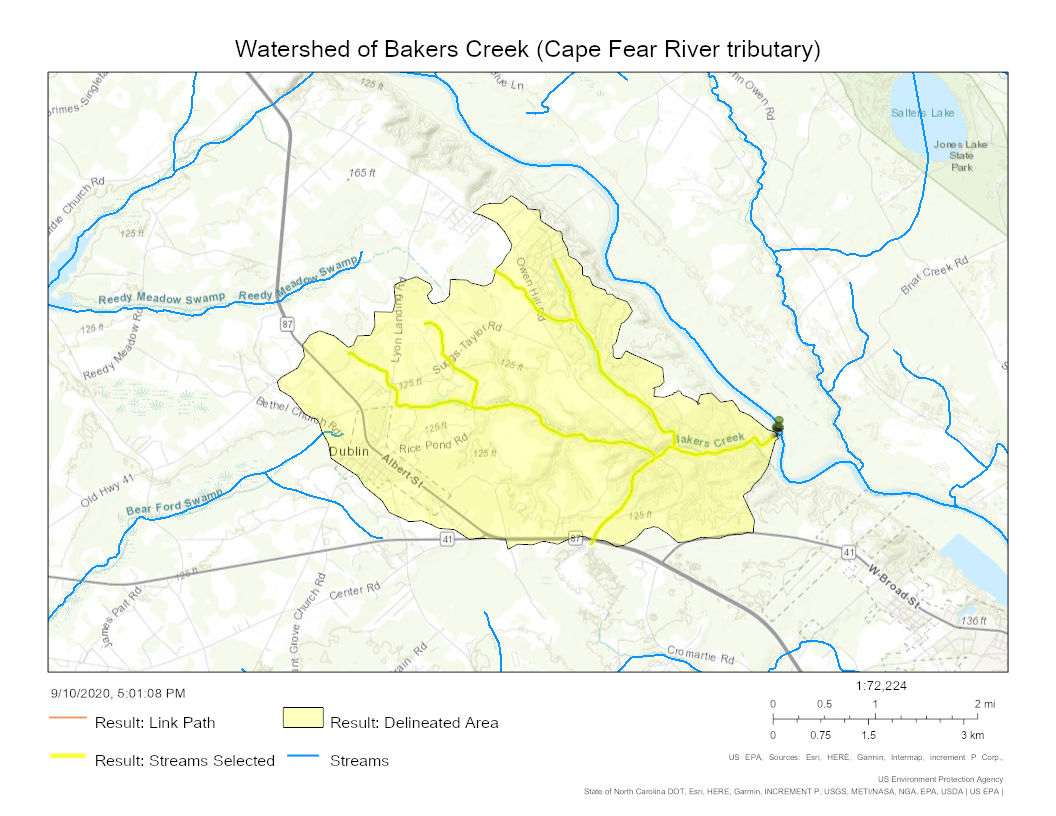
Watershed of Bakers Creek (Cape Fear River tributary)
