= Elwell Ferry =

Inland cable ferry in North Carolina, U.S.

Coordinates: 34°28′26.63″N 78°22′8.34″W

Elwell Ferry is an inland cable ferry which has operated since 1905 on Elwell Ferry Road between NC Highway 53 and NC Highway 87, crossing the Cape Fear River and connecting the communities of Carvers Creek and Kelly in Bladen County, North Carolina.

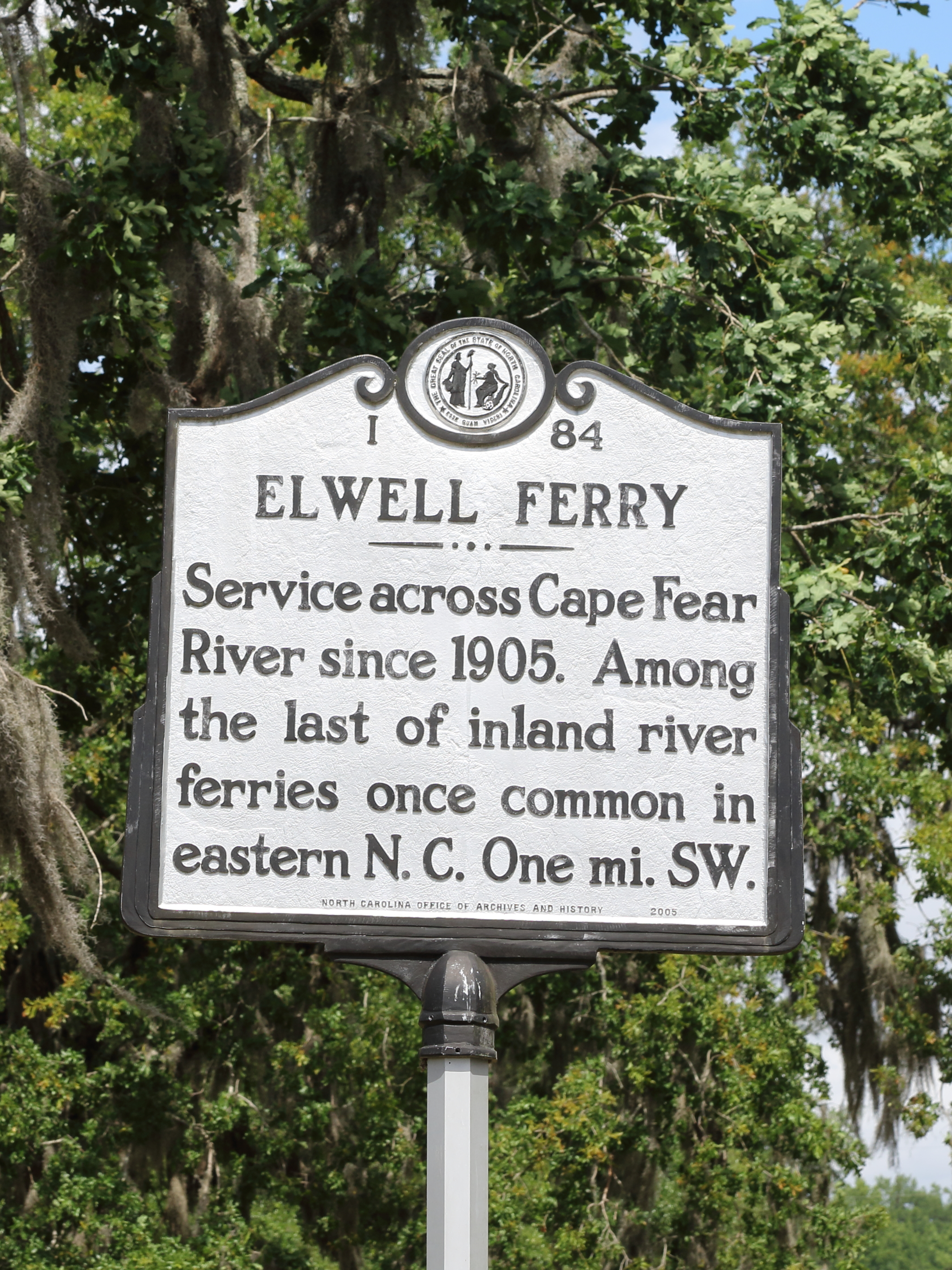
Highway marker sign Elwell Ferry Road & NC Hwy 53

Along with Parker's Ferry and Sans Souci Ferry, the Elwell Ferry is one of three remaining cable ferries operating in North Carolina.

== History ==
In the absence of nearby river crossings, brothers Walter Hayes Russ and John Roland Russ approached Bladen County officials and were granted authority to operate a crossing ferry. Service began in 1905 with Walter Russ and later his son, Lee Roy Russ, operating the ferry. The service was named for a local family.

Initially constructed of wood, the 33-foot ferryboat was poled upstream and rowed back by hand and could carry a wagon and two mules. The county subsidized the ferry's operation for toll-free service six days a week, with a quarter on Sundays and a fifty cent toll for night crossings.

In the 1930s, the North Carolina Department of Transportation incorporated its inland ferries into the state highway system, installing the first cable at Elwell and providing larger boats that could be guided with a pull stick. Walter Russ oversaw the modernization as well as the addition of a gasoline-powered engine on the boat in the late 1930s.

Until 1952, the Ferry was the only river crossing between Wilmington and Elizabethtown.

== Operations ==
The ferry travels a distance of 110 yards, shore to shore, with a travel time of five minutes, has a maximum capacity of two cars or four tons by weight, operates without a toll, and operates daily, providing service from 6 am to 6 pm, Spring and Summer, and from sunrise to sunset in the Winter and Fall. There is no ferry service on Christmas Day or on days of high water or storm conditions. Vehicles arriving on the opposite shore from the ferry, summon the ferry by blowing their horn. Ferry traffic averages 60 to 80 vehicles daily.

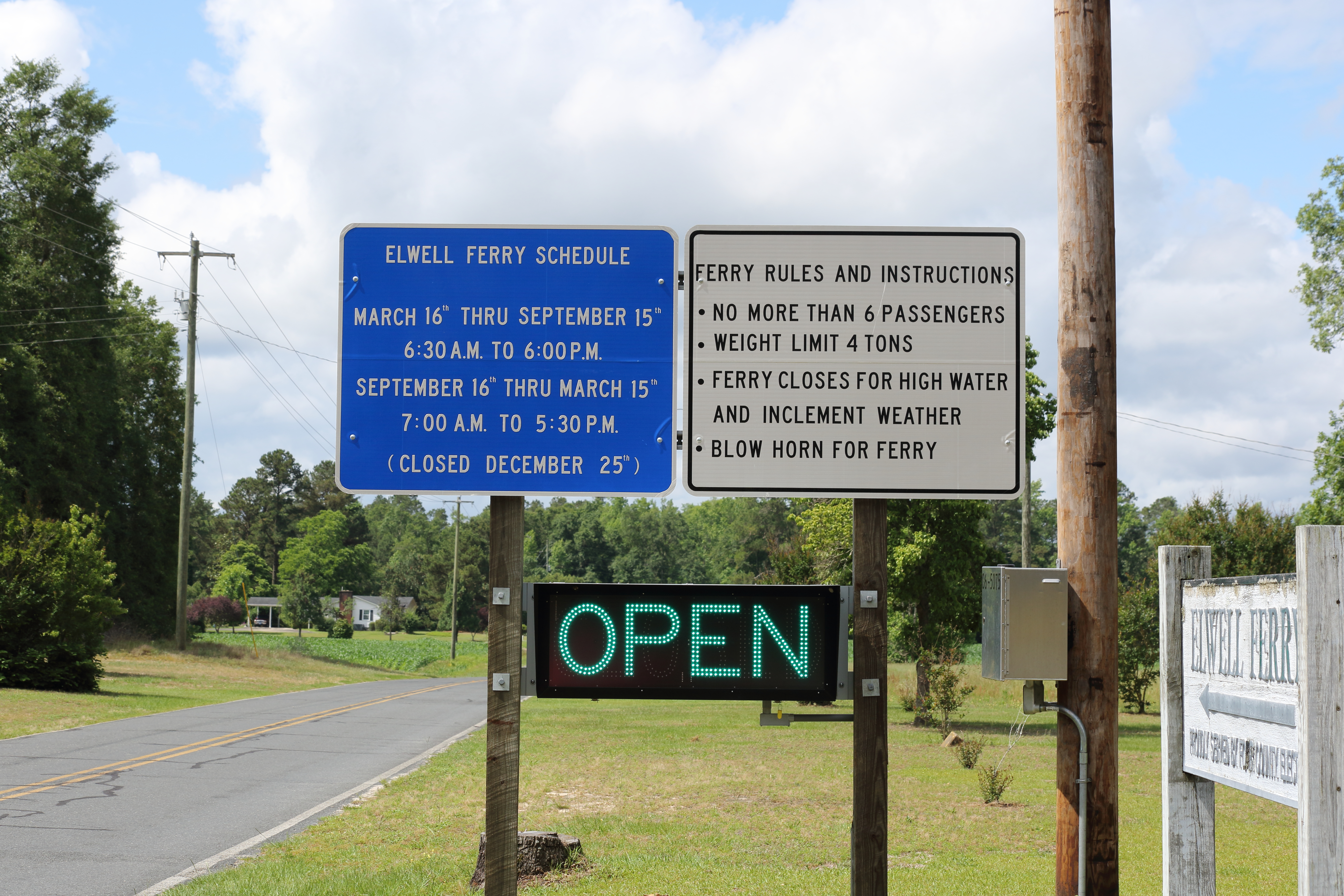
Elwell Ferry Status - east side Cape Fear river

The inland cable ferries located in North Carolina are operated by regional DOT divisional offices rather than the North Carolina Department of Transportation Ferry Division, with the Elwell Ferry operated by private contract with DOT Division 6. There are no plans to replace the Elwell Ferry with a bridge, which would likely cost more than the service for the secondary road would justify.

== Current design ==
Originally constructed of wood and since 1967 constructed of steel, the barge-like vessel features the controllman's room to one side, with the diesel engine sitting aside the control room.

As a powered cable ferry, the vessel is guided by a steel cable drawn across the river, secured on each shore by steel anchors. The cable is lowered into the river when the ferry is not operational and is stretched across the river during hours of operation. There is sufficient clearance for small boats to pass under the cable, but it is lowered when barges pass, though barge traffic on the Cape Fear river in this section ceased in the 1990s. The ferry is powered by a diesel engine and a propeller. Stopping is controlled by the operator's throttle. As the ferry cannot turn around, each end includes a ramp, and alignment of the ferry at each end is automatic.

== Fatalities, accidents and closings ==
Walter Russ, originator of the service, was the ferry's first fatality, killed in a March 1942 explosion caused when poorly ventilated fumes ignited in the bilge. A year later the ferry had been rebuilt and resumed service with safety improvements. In 1967 two men committed suicide by jumping off the ferry and in 1994 two men were killed trying to push an oversize vehicle onto the ferry. Prior to the use of wheel chocks, several vehicles had fallen overboard.

For two months in the summer of 2009, the ferry service remained closed, while pavement erosion from the Cape Fear River at the north and southern ferry landings was repaired. Service resumed in August, 2009. Following Hurricanes Matthew and Florence in 2016 and 2018, the ferry was closed for a year. In January 2020, flooding caused major damage and the ferry was taken to the Department of Transportation in White Lake, Bladen County for repairs. Today it is back on the water between Kelly and Carvers Creek, resuming operation on October 10, 2022.
