= East Arcadia, North Carolina =

- Town
- Location in Bladen County and the state of North Carolina.
- Coordinates: 34°22′53″N 78°19′23″W
- Country: United States
- State: North Carolina
- County: Bladen

Government
  - Mayor: Travis Andrews

Area
  - Total: 2.25 sq mi (5.82 km^{2})
  - Land: 2.25 sq mi (5.82 km^{2})
  - Water: 0 sq mi (0.00 km^{2})
- Elevation: 59 ft (18 m)

Population (2020)
  - Total: 418
  - Density: 186.1/sq mi (71.84/km^{2})
- Time zone: UTC-5 (Eastern (EST))
  - Summer (DST): UTC-4 (EDT)
- ZIP code: 28456
- Area codes: 910, 472
- FIPS code: 37-19300
- GNIS feature ID: 2406411
- Website: https://www.townofeastarcadia.org/

East Arcadia is a town in Bladen County, North Carolina, United States. The population was 418 at the 2020 census.

== Geography ==
According to the United States Census Bureau, the town has a total area of 2.2 square miles (5.7 km^{2}), all land.

== Demographics ==
Historical population
Census	Pop.	Note	%±
1980	461		—
1990	468		1.5%
2000	524		12.0%
2010	487		−7.1%
2020	418		−14.2%
U.S. Decennial Census

=== 2020 census ===
East Arcadia town, North Carolina – Racial and ethnic composition Note: the US Census treats Hispanic/Latino as an ethnic category. This table excludes Latinos from the racial categories and assigns them to a separate category. Hispanics/Latinos may be of any race.
Race / Ethnicity (NH = Non-Hispanic)	Pop 2000	Pop 2010	Pop 2020	% 2000	% 2010	% 2020
White alone (NH)	34	17	21	6.49%	3.49%	5.02%
Black or African American alone (NH)	470	435	359	89.69%	89.32%	85.89%
Native American or Alaska Native alone (NH)	1	10	7	0.19%	2.05%	1.67%
Asian alone (NH)	0	0	0	0.00%	0.00%	0.00%
Native Hawaiian or Pacific Islander alone (NH)	0	0	0	0.00%	0.00%	0.00%
Other race alone (NH)	0	0	8	0.00%	0.00%	1.91%
Mixed race or Multiracial (NH)	4	16	18	0.76%	3.29%	4.31%
Hispanic or Latino (any race)	15	9	5	2.86%	1.85%	1.20%
Total	524	487	418	100.00%	100.00%	100.00%

=== 2000 census ===
As of the census of 2000, there were 524 people, 198 households, and 139 families residing in the town. The population density was 240.5 people per square mile (92.9 people/km^{2}). There were 209 housing units at an average density of 95.9 per square mile (37.0/km^{2}). The racial makeup of the town was 6.49% White, 92.18% African American, 0.19% Native American, and 1.15% from two or more races. Hispanic or Latino of any race were 2.86% of the population.

There were 198 households, out of which 36.4% had children under the age of 18 living with them, 33.8% were married couples living together, 84.3% had a female householder with no husband present, and 29.3% were non-families. 28.3% of all households were made up of individuals, and 8.1% had someone living alone who was 65 years of age or older. The average household size was 2.65 and the average family size was 3.25.

In the town, the population was spread out, with 32.4% under the age of 18, 8.4% from 18 to 24, 29.2% from 25 to 44, 19.5% from 45 to 64, and 10.5% who were 65 years of age or older. The median age was 30 years. For every 100 females, there were 77.6 males. For every 100 females age 18 and over, there were 77.9 males.

The median income for a household in the town was $19,583, and the median income for a family was $19,545. Males had a median income of $25,000 versus $17,625 for females. The per capita income for the town was $7,956. About 34.1% of families and 34.9% of the population were below the poverty line, including 45.8% of those under age 18 and 34.0% of those age 65 or over.
