= Singletary Lake State Park =

State park in North Carolina, United States

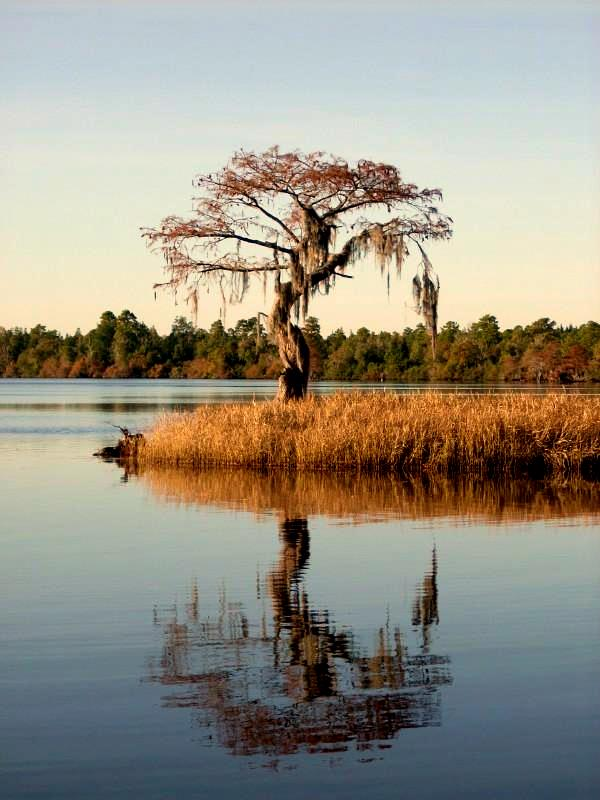
- A cypress near the shore of Singletary Lake

- Location within North Carolina Location within the United States
- Interactive map of Singletary Lake State Park
- Location: Bladen County, North Carolina, United States
- Coordinates: 34°34′59″N 78°26′59″W
- Area: 1,221 acres (494 ha)
- Elevation: 50 ft (15 m)
- Established: 1939
- Administrator: North Carolina Division of Parks and Recreation
- Website: Official website

Singletary Lake State Park is a North Carolina state park in Bladen County, North Carolina in the United States. Located near Elizabethtown, it covers 1,221 acres (4.94 km^{2}), including Singletary Lake, one of the largest Carolina bays. Singletary Lake State Park is southeast of Elizabethtown on North Carolina Highway 53 in North Carolina's Coastal Plain region. It serves primarily as a group camp but is open on a limited basis for year-round recreation, including hiking, fishing and observing nature.

== Geology ==
Singletary Lake is one of a series of Carolina bay lakes that stretch from New Jersey to Florida along the Atlantic Coastal Plain. Recent work by the U.S. Geological Survey has interpreted the Carolina Bays as relict thermokarst lakes that formed several thousands of years ago when the climate was colder, drier, and windier. Thermokarst lakes develop by thawing of frozen ground (permafrost) and by subsequent modification by wind and water. Thus, this interpretation suggests that permafrost once extended as far south as the Carolina Bays during the last ice age and (or) previous ice ages. Singletary Lake is not fed by any stream but relies entirely upon rain. The land beneath and surrounding the lake is mica-rich sandy clay and sand that is from the Upper Cretaceous era with a thin layer of Pleistocene deposits covering it. This land is lower than the surrounding land and drains very poorly, creating Singletary Lake.

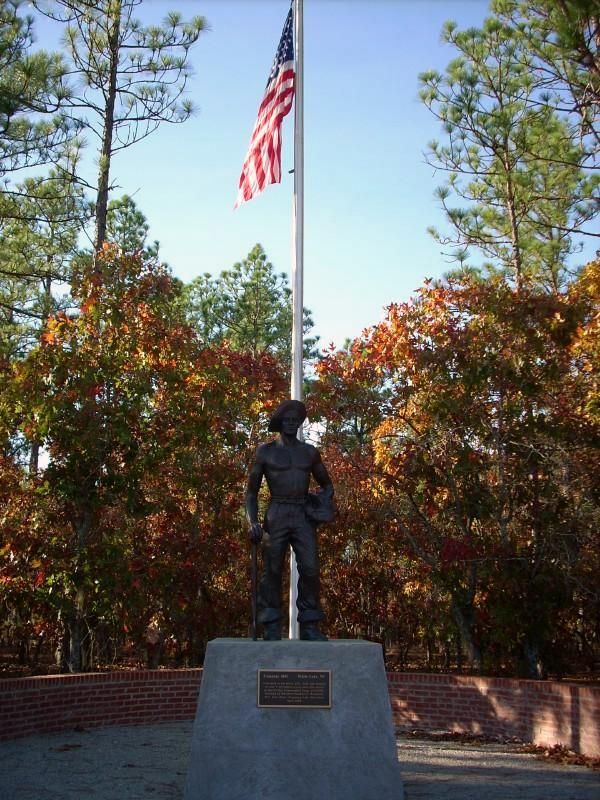
The CCC Statue is surrounded by turkey oak and longleaf pine trees.

== Human history ==
The Singletary Lake area was settled by colonists under the leadership of Richard Singletary who received a grant for land in Bladen County from the government of the Province of North Carolina in 1729. The early settlers quickly cleared the land for farming, ships masts, other wood products and naval stores. Singletary Lake, a Carolina Bay was not drained for farming as many of the bays in the surrounding area.

The government of the state of North Carolina began to take an interest in Singletary Lake and other Carolina Bays in the 19th century. The North Carolina General Assembly blocked all further private claims on lakes. Soon after, the state assembly pass legislation that granted ownership of all lakes greater than 500 acres (2.02 km^{2}) in Cumberland, Columbus and Bladen Counties to the state. The formation of Jones Lake, Lake Waccamaw and Singletary Lake state parks can be traced back to this piece of legislation.

The growth of the cotton, turpentine and lumber industries in the area of Singletary Lake State Park eventually became greater than the soil could support. The fertility of the farmland was depleted and most of the standing timber had been clear cut from Bladen County. The land could no longer support the demands of the people living on the land. Farmers were no longer able to produce sustainable crops and many were forced to leave their farms.

The National Park Service began purchasing the land surrounding Singletary Lake in 1936 for a recreational demonstration project. Out of work young men were employed by the Civilian Conservation Corps, which was established by United States President Franklin D. Roosevelt in 1933 during the Great Depression with many of the facilities of Singletary Lake State Park. The land was managed by the Resettlement Administration until 1939. From 1936 until 1939, youths working for the CCC built the Singletary Recreation Center. They constructed an office, maintenance buildings and recreation facilities on the shore of Singletary Lake. The CCC also built a ten cabin camp with a dining hall, workshop and recreation hall.

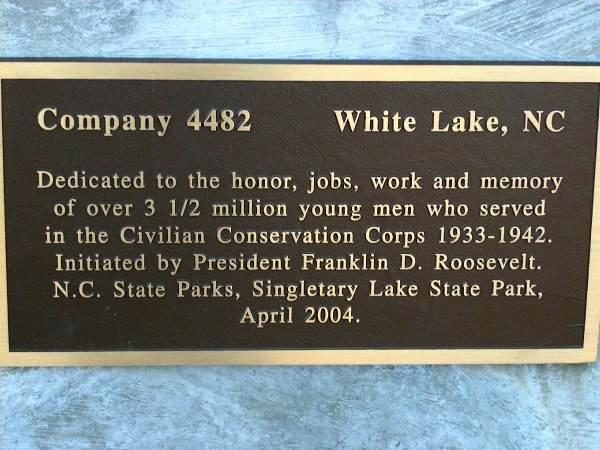
The efforts of the CCC are recognized with this plaque at Singletary Lake State Park

Singletary Lake State Park was established in 1939 when management of the park was transferred from the federal government to the state government. The cabins built by the CCC became Camp Ipecac which is still in use by large groups like the Boy Scouts of America and 4-H. The park became state property in 1954.

Singletary Lake State Park has provided more than recreation to the citizens of North Carolina. It was used by the American Red Cross during the 1945 floods of the Cape Fear River as a refugee center. Soldiers training for World War II at nearby Camp Davis used Singletary Lake State Park for special anti-aircraft training.

== Ecology ==
Singletary Lake is surrounded by a bay forest. This forest consists primarily of bay trees such as the loblolly, red bay, pond pine and Atlantic white cedar. The understory consists of huckleberry, leucothoe, gallberry and pepperbush. turkey oak, blueberry, holly and longleaf pine can be found at the higher elevations away from the shoreline.

The forests of Singletary Lake State Park provide a habitat for a variety of animals that are fairly common to an eastern woodland habitat. Wild turkey, white-tailed deer and rabbits can be spotted from time to time. Wood ducks live on the lake. Red-cockaded woodpeckers can be seen in the forest as can red-tailed hawks and pileated woodpeckers. Singletary Lake State Park is also home to box turtles, fence lizards, southern toads, and carpenter frogs.

The Turkey Oak Natural Area is a 133 acre (0.54 km^{2}) natural area that was set aside by the Society of American Foresters in the early 1960s. The aim of the natural area is to preserve the forest in a natural state for scientific study and educational opportunities. The Turkey Oak Natural Area is in the southeastern portion of Singletary Lake State Park in a bay bog and along a sand ridge.

== Recreation ==
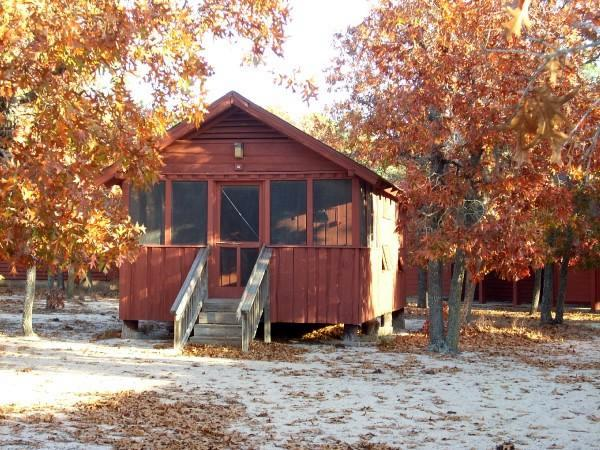
One of the cabins of Camp Ipecac at Singletary Lake State Park

Singletary Lake State Park is unique among North Carolina state parks. It is used primarily by private groups that have made arrangements to camp at Camp Ipecac or Camp Loblolly Bay, the two group camping facilities at the park. Visitors to the park are permitted access when the camp facilities are not in use.

Camp Ipecac was built in 1939 by the Resettlement Administration and the Civilian Conservation Corps during the Great Depression. It houses 92 campers in ten cabins. It is named for the Carolina ipecac, a herb that is used in traditional medicine. Camp Loblolly Bay was built in 1984 and houses 48 campers. It is more modern than Camp Ipecac and is open year round. Camp Ipecac opens in April and closes in October. Both camps include a mess hall and restrooms. Recreational facilities at the camps include outdoor basketball courts, a beach volleyball court and horseshoes. Charcoal grills are available in the picnic area with picnic tables.

The camps are open only to verifiable organizations of 20 persons or more. Reservations are required.

Local schools and civic organizations are invited to Singletary Lake State Park to take part in a variety of educational opportunities that are led by the park rangers. Classes for educators and middle school students introduce the learner to the ecology of the Carolina Bays.

The Civilian Conservation Corps-Carolina Bay Loop Trail is a one-mile (0.6 km) hiking trail that was built by the Civilian Conservation Corps during the Great Depression. It passes by the shore of Singletary Lake and then winds through the forest of bay trees and shrubs and a second forest of longleaf pine and turkey oak.

Singletary Lake is open to recreational boating and fishing. The waters of the lake have a high acidity level due to the amount of vegetation that is decomposing and the buildup peat on the lake bottom. The acid levels have limited the numbers of fish that inhabit the lake and recreation fishing is in turn limited. Yellow perch is one species that thrives in the lake and the fishing of the perch is permitted by the general public when the group camp is not in use. Campers may bring their own boats to launch on the lake as may the general public. All boats are limited to 10 horsepower (7.5 kW).
