= Brown Marsh Township, Bladen County, North Carolina =

Coordinates: 34.50949°N 78.63648°W

- Township
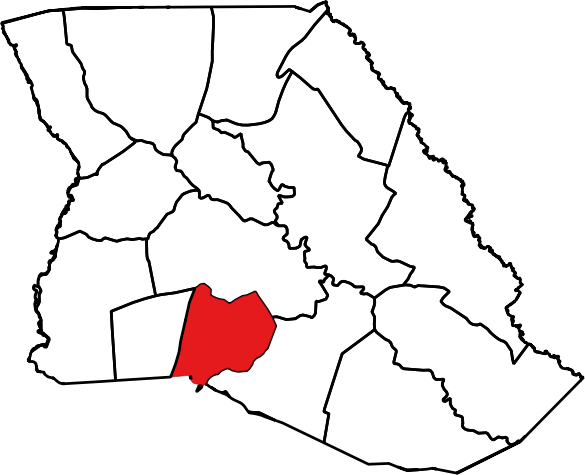
- Location of Brown Marsh Township in Bladen County

- Location of Bladen County in North Carolina
- Country: United States
- State: North Carolina
- County: Bladen

Area
  - Total: 33.80 sq mi (87.53 km^{2})
- Highest elevation (northwest of Clarkton, North Carolina): 124 ft (38 m)
- Lowest elevation (Brown Marsh Swamp): 65 ft (20 m)

Population (2010)
  - Total: 1,865
  - Density: 55.18/sq mi (21.31/km^{2})
- Time zone: UTC-4 (EST)
  - Summer (DST): UTC-5 (EDT)
- Area codes: 910, 472

Brown Marsh Township, population 1,865, is one of fifteen townships in Bladen County, North Carolina. Brown Marsh Township is 33.80 square miles (87.5 km^{2}) in size and is located in southern Bladen County. The Town of Clarkton, North Carolina is within Brown Marsh Township.

== Geography ==
Brown Marsh Township is drained by Brown Marsh Swamp and a tributary, Bigfoot Swamp. All of these streams are part of the larger Waccamaw River drainage.
