= Colly Township, Bladen County, North Carolina =

Colly Township
- Township
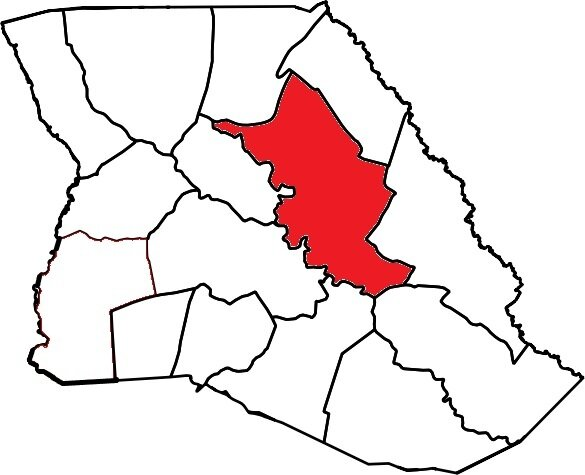
- Location of Colly Township within Bladen County

- Location of Bladen County within North Carolina
- Country: United States
- State: North Carolina
- County: Bladen

Area
  - Total: 94 sq mi (240 km^{2})

Population
  - Estimate (2022): 1,722
  - Density: 18.3/sq mi (7.1/km^{2})
- Time zone: UTC-5 (EST)
  - Summer (DST): UTC-4 (EDT)
- Area codes: 910, 472

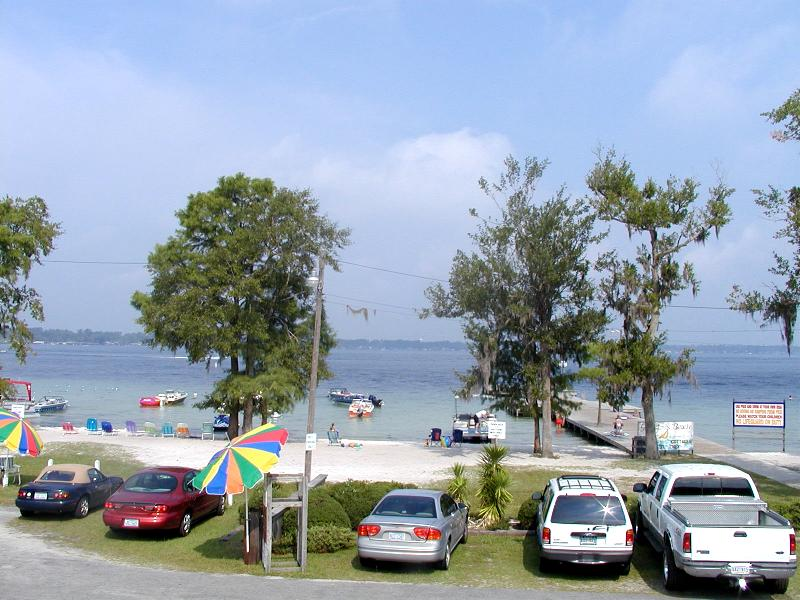
White Lake, the largest community within Colly Township

Colly Township is a township in Bladen County, North Carolina, United States.

== Geography and population ==
It is one of 15 townships within the county. It is 94 square miles (240 km^{2}) in total area, and is located in east-central Bladen County.

In 2022, the estimated population of the township was 1,722.

Communities within Colly Township include White Lake and Lagoon.

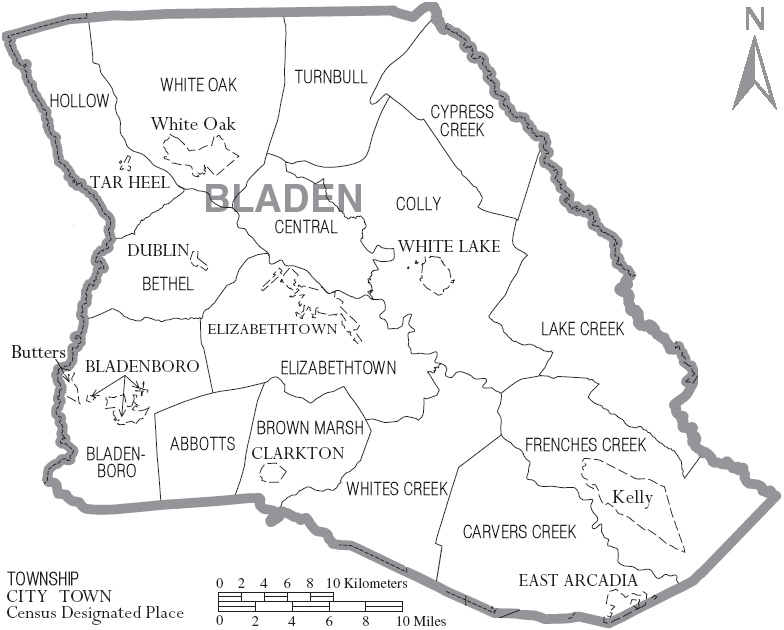
Map of Bladen County with municipal and township labels

== History ==
Colly Township was once home to the WECT tower, a guyed TV tower, which was one of the tallest constructions in the world. Erected in 1969, the tower was demolished in 2012.
