= Ammon, North Carolina =

Ammon
- Unincorporated community
- Location in North Carolina Ammon (the United States)
- Coordinates: 34°48′1″N 78°34′49″W
- Country: United States
- State: North Carolina
- County: Bladen
- Elevation: 95 ft (29 m)
- Time zone: UTC-5 (Eastern (EST))
  - Summer (DST): UTC-4 (EDT)
- Area codes: 910, 472

Ammon is an unincorporated community in Bladen County, North Carolina, United States. It is located on NC 242, southwest of Ammon Ford.
