= Emerson, North Carolina =

Unincorporated community in North Carolina, U.S.

Emerson
- Unincorporated community
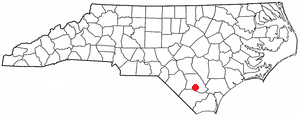
- Location within the U.S. state of North Carolina

- Location within the U.S. state of North Carolina
- Coordinates: 34.45°N 78.56°W
- Country: United States
- State: North Carolina
- County: Bladen
- Time zone: UTC-5 (Eastern)
  - Summer (DST): UTC-4 (EDT)
- ZIP Code: 28433
- Area codes: 910, 472

Emerson is an unincorporated community in Bladen County, North Carolina, United States.

== Geography ==
Emerson is located in southern Bladen County. The community borders Columbus County to the south and is located 45 miles (72 km) northwest of Wilmington.

The ZIP Code for Emerson is 28433.

== Population ==
In 2023, the population estimate for ZIP Code 28433 was 4,199.
