= Sparkleberry Landing, North Carolina =

Unincorporated community in North Carolina, U.S.

Sparkleberry Landing
- Unincorporated community
- Location within North Carolina
- Coordinates: 34.47°N 78.20°W
- Country: United States
- State: North Carolina
- County: Bladen
- Time zone: UTC-5 (EST)
  - Summer (DST): UTC-4 (EDT)
- ZIP Codes: 28447, 28448
- Area codes: 910, 472

Sparkleberry Landing is an unincorporated community in Bladen County, North Carolina, United States.

== Geography ==
Sparkleberry Landing is located in southeastern Bladen County, near the intersection of NC 53 and NC 11. The Black River flows to the east of the community.

The ZIP Codes for Sparkleberry Landing are 28447 and 28448.
