= Zara, North Carolina =

Unincorporated community in North Carolina, U.S.

Zara
- Unincorporated community
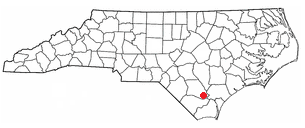
- Location within the U.S. state of North Carolina

- Location within the U.S. state of North Carolina
- Coordinates: 34.43°N 78.36°W
- Country: United States
- State: North Carolina
- County: Bladen
- Elevation: 66 ft (20 m)
- Time zone: UTC-5 (EST)
  - Summer (DST): UTC-4 (EDT)
- ZIP Code: 28456
- Area codes: 910, 472

Zara is an unincorporated community in Bladen County, North Carolina, United States.

== Geography ==
Zara is located along NC 87 in southeastern Bladen County, northwest of Sandyfield. The community is 28 miles (45 km) northwest of Wilmington.

The elevation of Zara is 66 feet (20 m).

The ZIP Code for Zara is 28456.
