= Ammon Ford, North Carolina =

Ammon Ford
- Unincorporated community
- Location within the state of North Carolina
- Coordinates: 34°47′34″N 78°35′12″W
- Country: United States
- State: North Carolina
- County: Bladen
- Elevation: 85 ft (26 m)
- Time zone: UTC-5 (Eastern (EST))
  - Summer (DST): UTC-4 (EDT)
- Area codes: 910, 472

Ammon Ford is an unincorporated community in Bladen County, North Carolina, United States. It is located northeast of Ammon. The population was 338 at the 2010 census.
