= Parker's Ferry =

Coordinates: 36°26′13″N 76°57′12″W

Parker's Ferry is a cable ferry located on the Meherrin River in Hertford County, North Carolina. The ferry is operated by a contractor for the North Carolina Department of Transportation.

Parker's Ferry on the Meherrin River near Winton, NC

Parker's Ferry connects Maney's Neck, formed by the confluence of the Meherrin and Chowan Rivers, with the southern part of Hertford County. The ferry is reached (on the south bank) by Parkers Ferry Road, which crosses the Meherrin River just above its confluence with the Chowan River and just below the confluence of Potecasi Creek and (on the north bank) by Parkers Fishery Road (Hertford SR 1306). It is one of three remaining cable ferries left in operation in North Carolina. The others are the Sans Souci Ferry and Elwell Ferry. The ferry is not considered part of the state ferry system which operates ferries along the immediate NC coast. The NC cable ferries are considered inland ferries and are operated by regional DOT divisional offices instead of the NC DOT Ferry Division.

== Operations ==
The ferry is powered by a diesel engine and propeller and guided by a steel cable that is stretched loosely across the river. The cable is secured on each side of the river by steel posts and as the ferry crosses the river, the force of the boat, with the help of rollers on the side of the boat, pulls the normally submerged cable out of the water. The cable is permanently secured to the ferry and allows for the boat to not stray off course in normal river currents. The ferry only carries two cars at its maximum and does not operate in high water conditions or storms for the threat of the cable snapping in treacherous conditions is too great. Persons wanting to ride the ferry that happen to be on the opposite side of the river than the ferry must blow their horn to summon the ferry. The ferry is free of charge. The ferry operates almost every day except for days of high water and bad weather. The Ferry is on land that was part of the Meherrin Indian Reservation. The Meherrin now live about 10 miles away in the Winton area.

The ferry was briefly closed from June 12, 2020 to October 20, 2020, due to a budget shortage caused by the Coronavirus outbreak

== Vessel description ==
The ferry consists of a steel barge that cars drive onto. Off to one side of the boat is an "engine room" where the operator sits and controls the boat's engine, which actually sits outside beside the room. The ferry is powered by a diesel engine. The operator must know when to let off the throttle, since the ferry has no brakes or on board steering device. In the early days the ferry was made of wood.
