= Sans Souci Ferry =

Coordinates: 35°55′N 76°49′W

The Sans Souci Ferry is a cable ferry that provides access across the Cashie River in Bertie County, North Carolina. Since the 1930s, the ferry has been operated by the North Carolina Department of Transportation.

The ferry is located on SR 1500 south of Windsor, North Carolina. It is one of three cable ferries that are still operating in North Carolina. The others are the Parker's Ferry and Elwell Ferry.

== History ==
The Sans Souci Ferry has operated in some form or fashion since at least the 1800s. It was not until the 1930s that the state Department of Transportation took over operations of the ferry and has operated it ever since. The ferry is not considered part of the state ferry system, which operates larger ferries along the immediate NC coast. The NC cable ferries are considered inland ferries. They are operated by regional DOT divisional offices instead of the NC DOT Ferry Division.

== Operations ==
The ferry is driven, or one could say guided, by a steel cable that stretches across the river. The cable is secured on each side of the river by steel posts. As the ferry crosses the river, the force of the boat, with the help of rollers on the side of the boat, pulls the normally submerged cable out of the water. The cable is permanently secured to the ferry and prevents the boat from straying off course in normal river currents. The ferry carries a maximum of two cars and does not operate in high water conditions or storms, as there is too much risk of the cable snapping in such treacherous conditions. Persons wanting to ride the ferry that happen to be on the opposite side of the river than the ferry must blow their vehicle horn to summon the ferry. The trip by ferry across the river takes roughly 5 minutes and saves a drive of about 20 miles. The ferry is free of charge. The ferry operates almost every day except for days of high water and bad weather.

== Vessel ==
The ferry has a steel, barge-like platform that cars drive onto. The "engine room" is located on one side of the ferry. Here the operator sits and controls the boat's engine, which is located outside and beside the room. The ferry is powered by a John Deere diesel engine. The operator must know when to let off the throttle, since the ferry has no brakes or on-board steering device.

== Replacement ==
Many have worried over the years that the ferry might be replaced by a bridge. NCDOT officials have said that the ferry will likely never be replaced with a bridge because of the high cost. The ferry serves a secondary road that carries mainly local traffic; the volume is not sufficient to justify construction costs of a bridge.

The ferry was briefly closed from June 12, 2020 to August 19, 2020, due to a budget shortage caused by the COVID-19 pandemic.
