= Butters, North Carolina =

- Census-designated place
- Location in Bladen County and the state of North Carolina.
- Coordinates: 34°33′37″N 78°50′56″W
- Country: United States
- State: North Carolina
- County: Bladen

Area
  - Total: 1.49 sq mi (3.85 km^{2})
  - Land: 1.48 sq mi (3.83 km^{2})
  - Water: 0.0077 sq mi (0.02 km^{2})
- Elevation: 115 ft (35 m)

Population (2020)
  - Total: 250
  - Density: 169.2/sq mi (65.33/km^{2})
- Time zone: UTC-5 (Eastern (EST))
  - Summer (DST): UTC-4 (EDT)
- ZIP code: 28320
- Area codes: 910, 472
- FIPS code: 37-09380
- GNIS feature ID: 2402739

Butters is a census-designated place (CDP) in Bladen County, North Carolina, United States. The population was 250 at the 2020 census.

== Geography ==
According to the United States Census Bureau, the CDP has a total area of 1.3 square miles (3.4 km^{2}), of which 0.008 square miles (0.02 km^{2}), or 0.67%, is water.

== Demographics ==
Historical population
| Census | Pop. | Note | %± |
|---|---|---|---|
| 2020 | 250 | | — |
U.S. Decennial Census

As of the census of 2000, there were 261 people, 108 households, and 77 families residing in the CDP. The population density was 201.1 people per square mile (77.6 people/km^{2}). There were 119 housing units at an average density of 91.7 per square mile (35.4/km^{2}). The racial makeup of the CDP was 92.72% White, 4.60% African American, 2.30% from other races, and 0.38% from two or more races. Hispanic or Latino of any race were 2.30% of the population.

There were 108 households, out of which 35.2% had children under the age of 18 living with them, 57.4% were married couples living together, 11.1% had a female householder with no husband present, and 27.8% were non-families. 25.0% of all households were made up of individuals, and 14.8% had someone living alone who was 65 years of age or older. The average household size was 2.42 and the average family size was 2.88.

In the CDP, the population was spread out, with 23.8% under the age of 18, 8.0% from 18 to 24, 32.2% from 25 to 44, 24.1% from 45 to 64, and 11.9% who were 65 years of age or older. The median age was 37 years. For every 100 females, there were 89.1 males. For every 100 females age 18 and over, there were 89.5 males.

The median income for a household in the CDP was $26,875, and the median income for a family was $45,250. Males had a median income of $26,484 versus $21,908 for females. The per capita income for the CDP was $16,722. About 9.2% of families and 29.0% of the population were below the poverty line, including none of those under the age of eighteen and 100.0% of those 65 or over.
