= Bladen County, North Carolina =

County in North Carolina, United States

- County
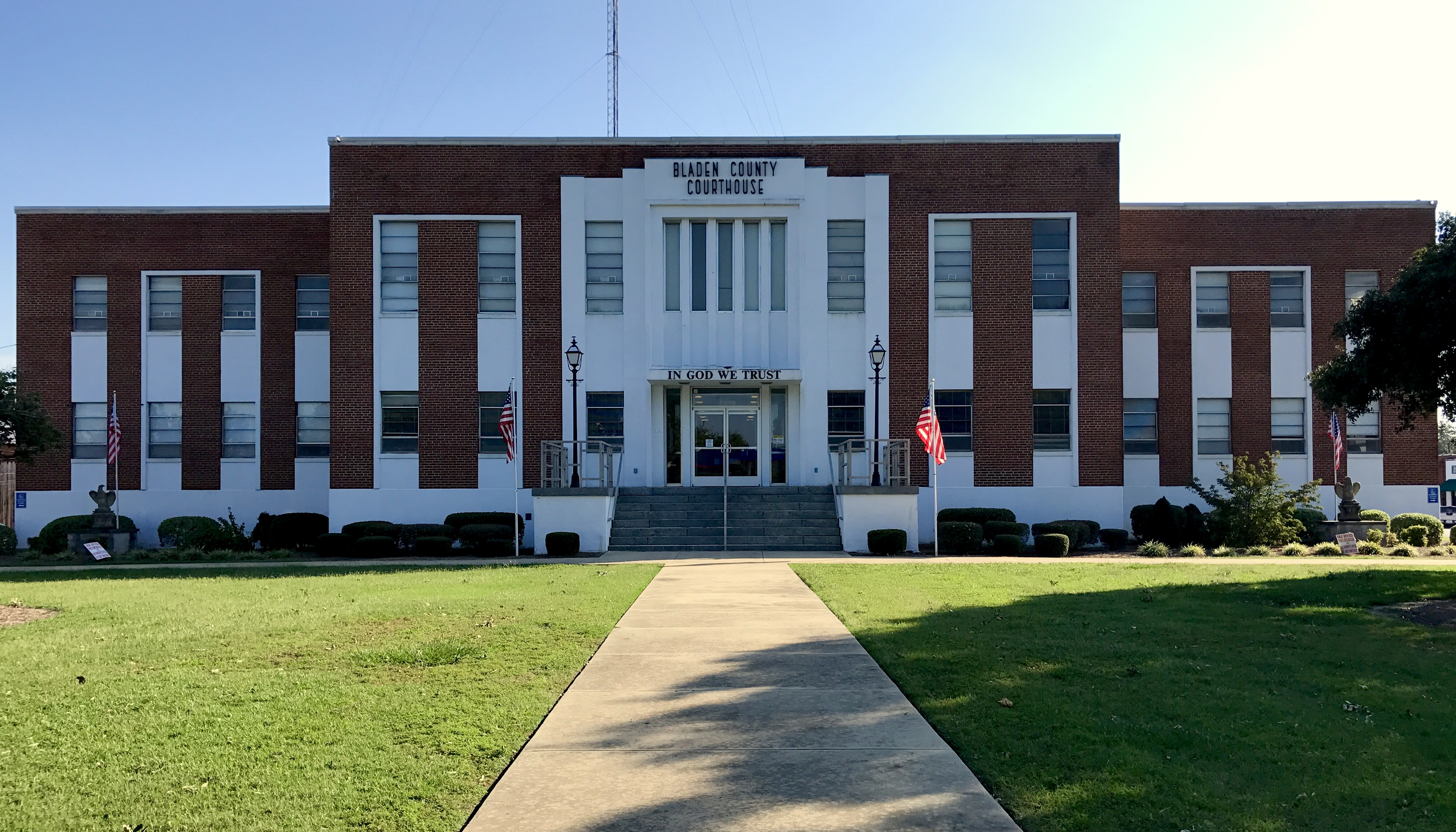
- Bladen County Courthouse

- Flag Seal
- Nickname: The Mother County
- Motto: "In God We Trust"
- Location within the U.S. state of North Carolina
- Interactive map of Bladen County, North Carolina
- Coordinates: 34.59°N 78.54°W
- Country: United States
- State: North Carolina
- Founded: 1734
- Named for: Martin Bladen
- Seat: Elizabethtown
- Largest community: Elizabethtown

Area
  - Total: 887.78 sq mi (2,299.3 km^{2})
  - Land: 875.03 sq mi (2,266.3 km^{2})
  - Water: 12.75 sq mi (33.0 km^{2}) 1.44%

Population (2020)
  - Total: 29,606
  - Estimate (2025): 30,007 ▲
  - Density: 33.83/sq mi (13.06/km^{2})
- Time zone: UTC−5 (Eastern)
  - Summer (DST): UTC−4 (EDT)
- Congressional district: 7th
- Website: bladennc.govoffice3.com

Bladen County (/ˈbleɪdən/) is a county located in the U.S. state of North Carolina. As of the 2020 census, the population was 29,606. Its county seat is Elizabethtown. The county was created in 1734 as Bladen Precinct and gained county status in 1739.

== History ==
Bladen County was formed in 1734 as Bladen Precinct of Bath County, from New Hanover Precinct. It was named for Martin Bladen, a member of the Board of Trade. With the abolition of Bath County in 1739, all of its constituent precincts became counties.

Bladen's original residents included the Waccamaw people.

=== Split into other counties ===
Bladen County began as a vast territory, with indefinite northern and western boundaries. Reductions in its extent began in 1750, when its western part became Anson County. In 1754, the northern part of what was left of Bladen County became Cumberland County. In 1764, the southern part of what remained of Bladen County was combined with part of New Hanover County to form Brunswick County. In 1787, the western part of the now much smaller Bladen became Robeson County. Finally, in 1808, the southern part of Bladen County was combined with part of Brunswick County to form Columbus County. Bladen County is considered the "mother county" of North Carolina, because of the present 100 counties in the state, 55 of them belonged to Bladen at one point.

== Geography ==
According to the U.S. Census Bureau, the county has a total area of 887.78 square miles (2,299.3 km^{2}), of which 874.03 square miles (2,263.7 km^{2}) is land and 12.75 square miles (33.0 km^{2}) (1.44%) is water. It is the fourth-largest county in North Carolina by land area.

=== State and local protected areas ===
- Bakers Lake State Natural Area
- Bay Tree Lake State Natural Area
- Bladen Lakes State Forest
- Bladen Lakes State Forest Game Land
- Jones Lake State Park
- Singletary Lake State Park
- Suggs Mill Pond Game Land (part)
- Turnbull Creek Educational State Forest
- White State Lake
- Whitehall Plantation Game Land (part)

=== Major water bodies ===
- Bay Tree Lake
- Slades Swamp
- Black River, home of the oldest documented Taxodium distichum (bald cypress) at 2,651 years old
- Cape Fear River
- Jones Lake
- Little Singletary Lake
- Salters Lake
- Singletary Lake
- South River
- Waccamaw River
- White Lake

=== Adjacent counties ===
- Cumberland County – north
- Sampson County – northeast
- Pender County – east
- Columbus County – south
- Robeson County – west

=== Major highways ===
- US 701
- US 701 Bus.
- NC 11
- NC 20
- NC 41
- NC 53
- NC 87
- NC 87 Bus.
- NC 131
- NC 210
- NC 211
- NC 211 Bus.
- NC 242
- NC 410

=== Major infrastructure ===
- Curtis L. Brown Jr. Field
- Elwell Ferry, river ferry across the Cape Fear River

== Climate ==
Bladen County is located in the humid subtropical climate (Köppen climate classification Cfa) zone, with mostly moderate temperatures year round. Winters are mild across Bladen, with the warmest winter temperatures found in the southeastern portion of the county due to the influence of the nearby Atlantic Ocean. The average high temperature in January is around 55 °F (13 °C). Summers are hot and humid, with the hottest summer temperatures found in the northern and western areas of Bladen County. The average high temperature in July is around 90 °F (32 °C).

The USDA hardiness zones for Bladen County are Zone 8A (10 °F to 15 °F or −12 °C to −9 °C) and Zone 8B (15 °F to 20 °F or −9 °C to −6 °C).

=== Extreme temperatures ===
Although uncommon, extreme temperatures can occur in Bladen County.

- In December 1989, Elizabethtown recorded a new record low temperature of −3 °F (−19 °C).
- In August 2007, Elizabethtown recorded a new record high temperature of 105 °F (41 °C).

=== Frost ===
Frost does occur in Bladen County. Most of the county experiences 50–75 days of frost conditions annually. However, southeastern Bladen averages only 40–50 days of frost conditions annually, due to its proximity to the Atlantic Ocean.

=== Snow ===
Like much of eastern North Carolina, snow is rare in Bladen County. On average, light snowfall occurs once or twice every 10 years.

== Demographics ==
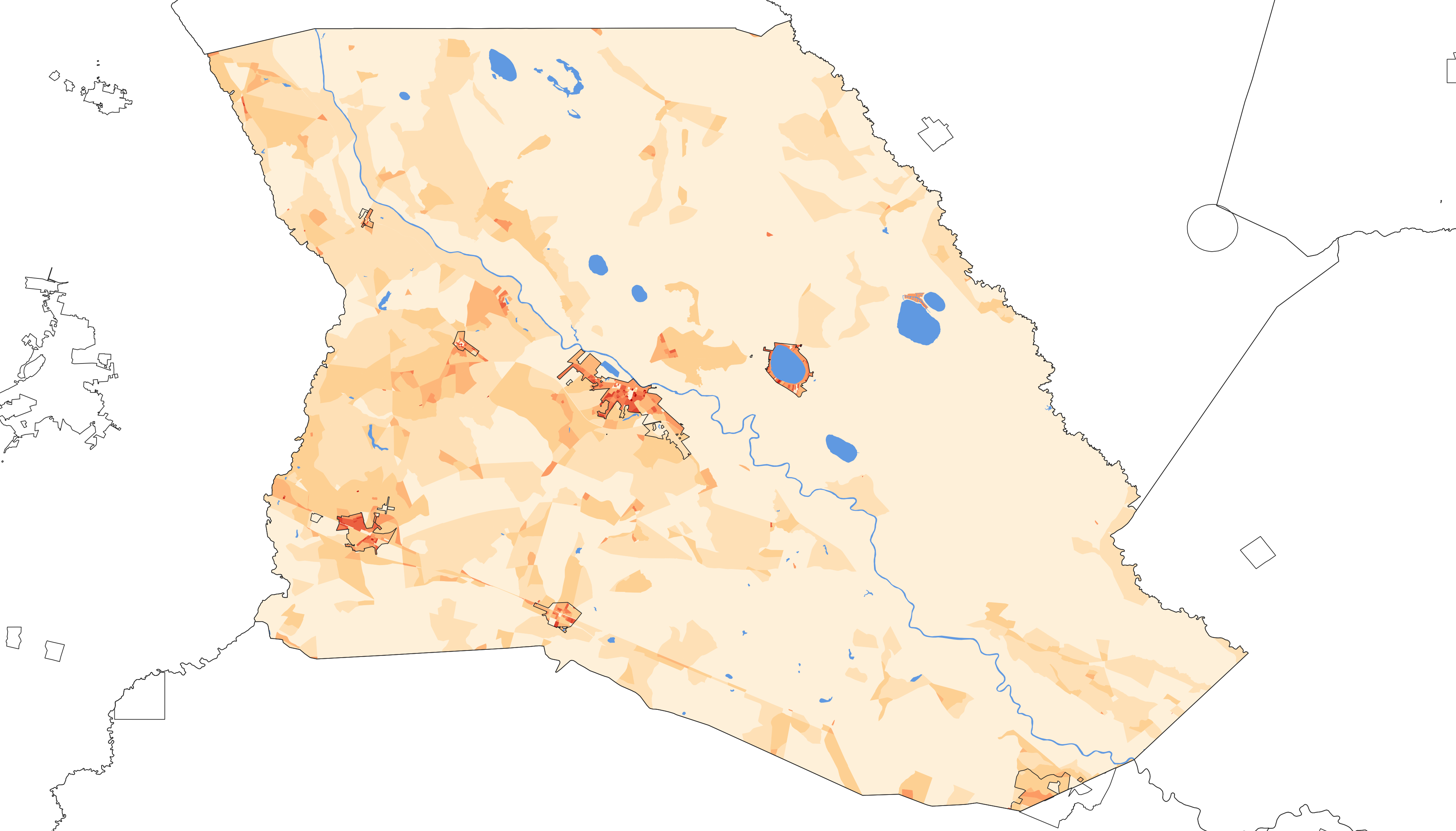
2020 population density of Bladen County NC by census block

=== 2020 census ===
As of the 2020 census, the county had a population of 29,606. The median age was 44.7 years, 20.9% of residents were under the age of 18, and 22.0% were 65 years of age or older. For every 100 females there were 91.3 males, and for every 100 females age 18 and over there were 89.3 males age 18 and over.

The racial makeup of the county was 54.4% White, 32.3% Black or African American, 2.7% American Indian and Alaska Native, 0.2% Asian, <0.1% Native Hawaiian and Pacific Islander, 6.1% from some other race, and 4.3% from two or more races. Hispanic or Latino residents of any race comprised 8.6% of the population.

Less than 0.1% of residents lived in urban areas, while 100.0% lived in rural areas.

There were 12,410 households in the county, of which 27.6% had children under the age of 18 living in them. Of all households, 41.4% were married-couple households, 20.0% were households with a male householder and no spouse or partner present, and 33.3% were households with a female householder and no spouse or partner present. About 31.8% of all households were made up of individuals and 15.5% had someone living alone who was 65 years of age or older.

There were 15,131 housing units, of which 18.0% were vacant. Among occupied housing units, 70.9% were owner-occupied and 29.1% were renter-occupied. The homeowner vacancy rate was 1.1% and the rental vacancy rate was 7.7%.

=== Racial and ethnic composition ===
Bladen County, North Carolina – Racial and ethnic composition Note: the US Census treats Hispanic/Latino as an ethnic category. This table excludes Latinos from the racial categories and assigns them to a separate category. Hispanics/Latinos may be of any race.
Race / Ethnicity (NH = Non-Hispanic)	Pop 1980	Pop 1990	Pop 2000	Pop 2010	Pop 2020	% 1980	% 1990	% 2000	% 2010	% 2020
White alone (NH)	18,195	16,860	18,035	19,242	15,830	59.67%	58.82%	55.87%	54.68%	53.47%
Black or African American alone (NH)	11,616	11,167	12,170	12,202	9,505	38.10%	38.96%	37.70%	34.67%	32.10%
Native American or Alaska Native alone (NH)	321	461	618	712	701	1.05%	1.61%	1.91%	2.02%	2.37%
Asian alone (NH)	33	21	26	67	47	0.11%	0.07%	0.08%	0.19%	0.16%
Native Hawaiian or Pacific Islander alone (NH)	x	x	11	5	8	x	x	0.03%	0.01%	0.03%
Other race alone (NH)	14	4	31	29	67	0.05%	0.01%	0.10%	0.08%	0.23%
Mixed race or Multiracial (NH)	x	x	189	431	902	x	x	0.59%	1.22%	3.05%
Hispanic or Latino (any race)	312	150	1,198	2,502	2,546	1.02%	0.52%	3.71%	7.11%	8.60%
Total	30,491	28,663	32,278	35,190	29,606	100.00%	100.00%	100.00%	100.00%	100.00%

=== Demographic change ===
Historical population

Historical population
Census	Pop.	Note	%±
1790	5,100		—
1800	7,028		37.8%
1810	5,671		−19.3%
1820	7,276		28.3%
1830	7,811		7.4%
1840	8,022		2.7%
1850	9,767		21.8%
1860	11,995		22.8%
1870	12,831		7.0%
1880	16,158		25.9%
1890	16,763		3.7%
1900	17,677		5.5%
1910	18,006		1.9%
1920	19,761		9.7%
1930	22,389		13.3%
1940	27,156		21.3%
1950	29,703		9.4%
1960	28,881		−2.8%
1970	26,477		−8.3%
1980	30,491		15.2%
1990	28,663		−6.0%
2000	32,278		12.6%
2010	35,190		9.0%
2020	29,606		−15.9%
2025 (est.)	30,007	▲	1.4%
U.S. Decennial Census; 1790–1960 1900–1990; 1990–2000 2010 2020

Between 2010 and 2020, Bladen County experienced a population decline of 15.9 percent, losing 5,584 residents.

== Government and politics ==
=== Government ===
Bladen County is a member of the Lumber River Council of Governments, a regional planning board representing five counties. It is governed by a nine-member board of county commissioners elected from both district seats and at-large. It is one of four counties in the state that elect nine members to its board instead of the more common five.

It lies within the bounds of North Carolina's 15th Prosecutorial District, the 13A Superior Court District, and the 13th District Court District.

=== Politics ===
United States presidential election results for Bladen County, North Carolina
Year	Republican		Democratic		Third party(ies)	
Year	No.	%	No.	%	No.	%
1912	33	1.96%	1,140	67.70%	511	30.34%
1916	651	34.05%	1,261	65.95%	0	0.00%
1920	1,064	35.43%	1,939	64.57%	0	0.00%
1924	786	33.31%	1,551	65.72%	23	0.97%
1928	1,911	55.18%	1,552	44.82%	0	0.00%
1932	808	23.12%	2,651	75.85%	36	1.03%
1936	551	14.09%	3,360	85.91%	0	0.00%
1940	543	15.66%	2,925	84.34%	0	0.00%
1944	731	22.33%	2,542	77.67%	0	0.00%
1948	500	12.77%	2,831	72.33%	583	14.90%
1952	1,710	32.78%	3,506	67.22%	0	0.00%
1956	1,542	27.44%	4,078	72.56%	0	0.00%
1960	1,854	29.87%	4,353	70.13%	0	0.00%
1964	2,169	32.45%	4,516	67.55%	0	0.00%
1968	1,746	20.79%	2,754	32.80%	3,897	46.41%
1972	4,205	64.72%	2,201	33.88%	91	1.40%
1976	1,546	20.37%	6,009	79.18%	34	0.45%
1980	2,745	30.70%	6,104	68.27%	92	1.03%
1984	4,701	48.07%	5,064	51.78%	14	0.14%
1988	3,770	42.77%	5,031	57.08%	13	0.15%
1992	3,214	31.58%	5,700	56.01%	1,263	12.41%
1996	3,335	37.22%	4,952	55.27%	673	7.51%
2000	4,977	45.63%	5,889	53.99%	42	0.39%
2004	6,174	50.14%	6,109	49.61%	30	0.24%
2008	7,532	48.66%	7,853	50.73%	95	0.61%
2012	7,748	48.56%	8,062	50.52%	147	0.92%
2016	8,550	53.78%	7,058	44.40%	289	1.82%
2020	9,676	56.50%	7,326	42.78%	123	0.72%
2024	10,035	59.86%	6,620	39.49%	109	0.65%

Following the 2018 United States Midterm Elections, an investigation was opened into accusations of an absentee ballot fraud scheme directed by McCrae Dowless in Bladen County, within North Carolina's 9th Congressional District. Accusations were based around the Republican Primary election, in which Mark Harris defeated incumbent Robert Pittenger, and around the general election, in which Harris initially appeared to defeat Democrat Dan McCready. As of December 2018, the investigation is currently ongoing. Wake County District Attorney Lorrin Freeman, Democrat, said it was possible over 1,000 ballots had been destroyed. According to District Attorney Jon David, Republican, the county has a "troubled history of political groups exploiting the use of absentee ballots." The scandal brought national media attention to Bladen.

As of 2022, Bladen County is home to about 22,000 registered voters, comprising about 9,700 registered Democrats, about 5,100 Republicans, and about 7,000 unaffiliated voters.

== Education ==
=== Colleges ===
- Bladen Community College (Dublin)

=== Public schools ===
Public schools within Bladen County are operated by Bladen County Schools.

== Healthcare ==
Bladen County is served by a single hospital, Cape Fear Valley Medical Center, based in Elizabethtown. According to the 2022 County Health Rankings produced by the University of Wisconsin Population Health Institute, Bladen County ranked 85th in health outcomes of North Carolina's 100 counties, an improvement of 10 ranks over the previous five years. Per the ranking, 26 percent of adults say they are in poor or fair health, the average life expectancy is 75 years, and 16 percent of people under the age of 65 lack health insurance. It has one primary care physician per 4,670 residents.

== Economy ==
Agriculture constitutes a major part of Bladen County's economy. Smithfield Foods operates a pork processing facility north of the town of Tar Heel, the largest such plant in the world. It employs 5,800 workers, making it the county's largest employer. The county is the largest producer of blueberries in the state. Area farmers also grow soybeans, peanuts, corn, wheat, and cotton, and raise swine and poultry. The county suffers from a large poverty rate and is one of the most economically distressed counties in the state. According to census figures, about 70 percent of working people in Bladen are employed outside the county.

== Communities ==
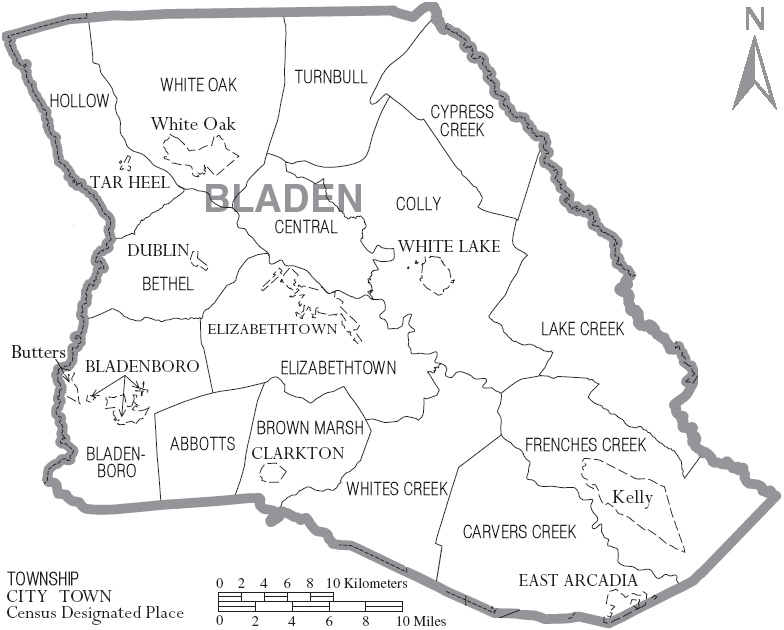
Map of Bladen County with municipal and township labels

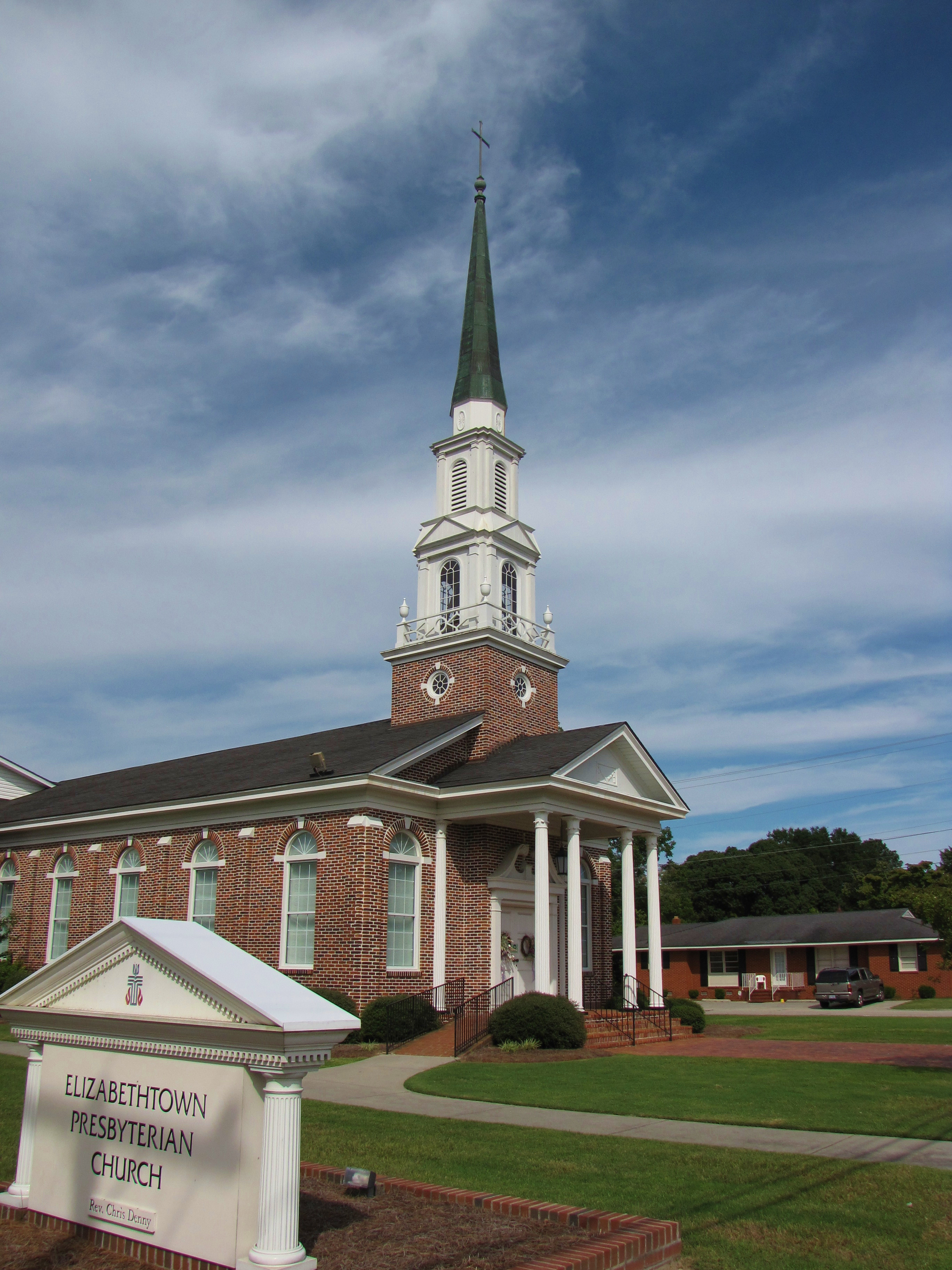
Elizabethtown Presbyterian Church, Elizabethtown

=== Towns ===
- Bladenboro
- Clarkton
- Dublin
- East Arcadia
- Elizabethtown (county seat and largest community)
- Tar Heel
- White Lake

=== Census-designated places ===
- Butters
- Kelly
- White Oak

=== Unincorporated communities ===
- Abbottsburg
- Ammon
- Ammon Ford
- Carvers
- Colly
- Council
- Emerson
- Rosindale
- Rowan
- Sparkleberry Landing
- Westbrook
- Zara

=== Townships ===
- Abbotts
- Bethel
- Bladenboro
- Brown Marsh
- Carvers Creek
- Central
- Colly
- Cypress Creek
- Elizabethtown
- Frenches Creek
- Hollow
- Lake Creek
- Turnbull
- White Oak
- Whites Creek

=== Population ranking ===
The population ranking of the following table is based on the 2020 census of Bladen County.

† = county seat

Rank	Name	Type	Population (2020 census)
1	† Elizabethtown	Town	3,296
2	Bladenboro	Town	1,648
3	White Lake	Town	843
4	Clarkton	Town	614
5	Kelly	CDP	446
6	East Arcadia	Town	418
7	White Oak	CDP	346
8	Dublin	Town	267
9	Butters	CDP	250
10	Tar Heel	Town	90

== See also ==
- List of counties in North Carolina
- National Register of Historic Places listings in Bladen County, North Carolina
- Waccamaw Siouan Indians, state-recognized tribe that resides in the county
- Colcor, political corruption investigation on government officials in neighboring Columbus County
- GenX, chemical compound found in the Cape Fear River, south of Fayetteville
