= Singletary Lake =

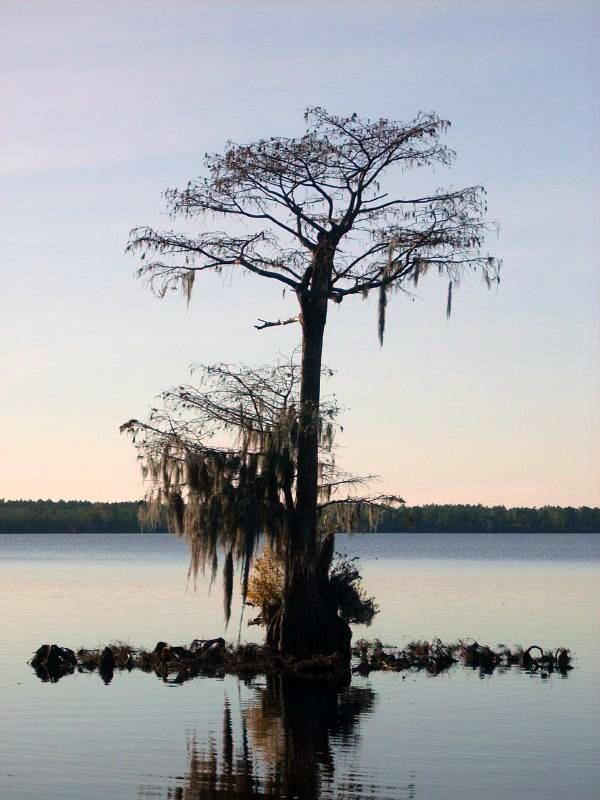
- December 2007

- Location within North Carolina Location within the United States
- Location: Bladen County, North Carolina, United States
- Coordinates: 34°35′20″N 078°26′55″W
- Type: Carolina Bay
- Primary inflows: rainwater
- Basin countries: United States
- Managing agency: North Carolina Department of Environment and Natural Resources
- Designation: State Lake
- Surface area: 572 acres (2.3 km^{2})
- Average depth: 11.8 ft (3.6 m)
- Surface elevation: 62 ft (19 m)

Singletary Lake, surrounded by Singletary Lake State Park in Bladen County, North Carolina in the United States, is one of a series of Carolina bay lakes that stretch from New Jersey to Florida along the Atlantic Coastal Plain. Recent work by the U.S. Geological Survey has interpreted the Carolina Bays as relict thermokarst lakes that formed several thousands of years ago when the climate was colder, drier, and windier. Thermokarst lakes develop by thawing of frozen ground (permafrost) and by subsequent modification by wind and water. Thus, this interpretation suggests that permafrost once extended as far south as the Carolina Bays during the last ice age and (or) previous ice ages. Singletary Lake is not fed by any stream, but relies entirely upon rain. The land beneath and surrounding the lake is mica-rich sandy clay and sand that is from the Upper Cretaceous era with a thin layer of Pleistocene deposits covering it. This land is lower than the surrounding land and drains very poorly, creating Singletary Lake.

The southwest corner of the lake is bordered by a bog that is densely covered by bay trees. A sandy rim on the southeast side of the lake supports very little vegetation. Venus Flytraps can be found in the margin between the bog and the sand rim.

Singletary Lake is the deepest of the Carolina Bays at 11.8 feet (3.6 m) but not the largest. It covers 572 acres (2.31 km^{2}) with four miles (6.43 km) of shoreline. Since Singletary Lake is not fed by streams and relies upon rainwater the level of the lake varies with the amount of precipitation in the area.

Most bay lakes, such as Singletary Lake, are completely surrounded by vegetation. Trees and shrubs that grow along the shoreline reduce current and wave action. This permits sediments to settle and stimulates plant growth. As the plants die off peat is produced. The peat accumulates on the shore line and more plants grow atop the peat. Very slowly the forest surrounding the lake will creep into the lake, reducing the size of the lake before eventually a swampy forest stands where a lake once was. This process has reduced the size of Singletary Lake by at least 44%.

The lake was established as a North Carolina State Lake in 1929, and it is managed by the adjacent Singletary Lake State Park.

== See also ==
- Singletary Lake State Park
