= Dublin, North Carolina =

- Town
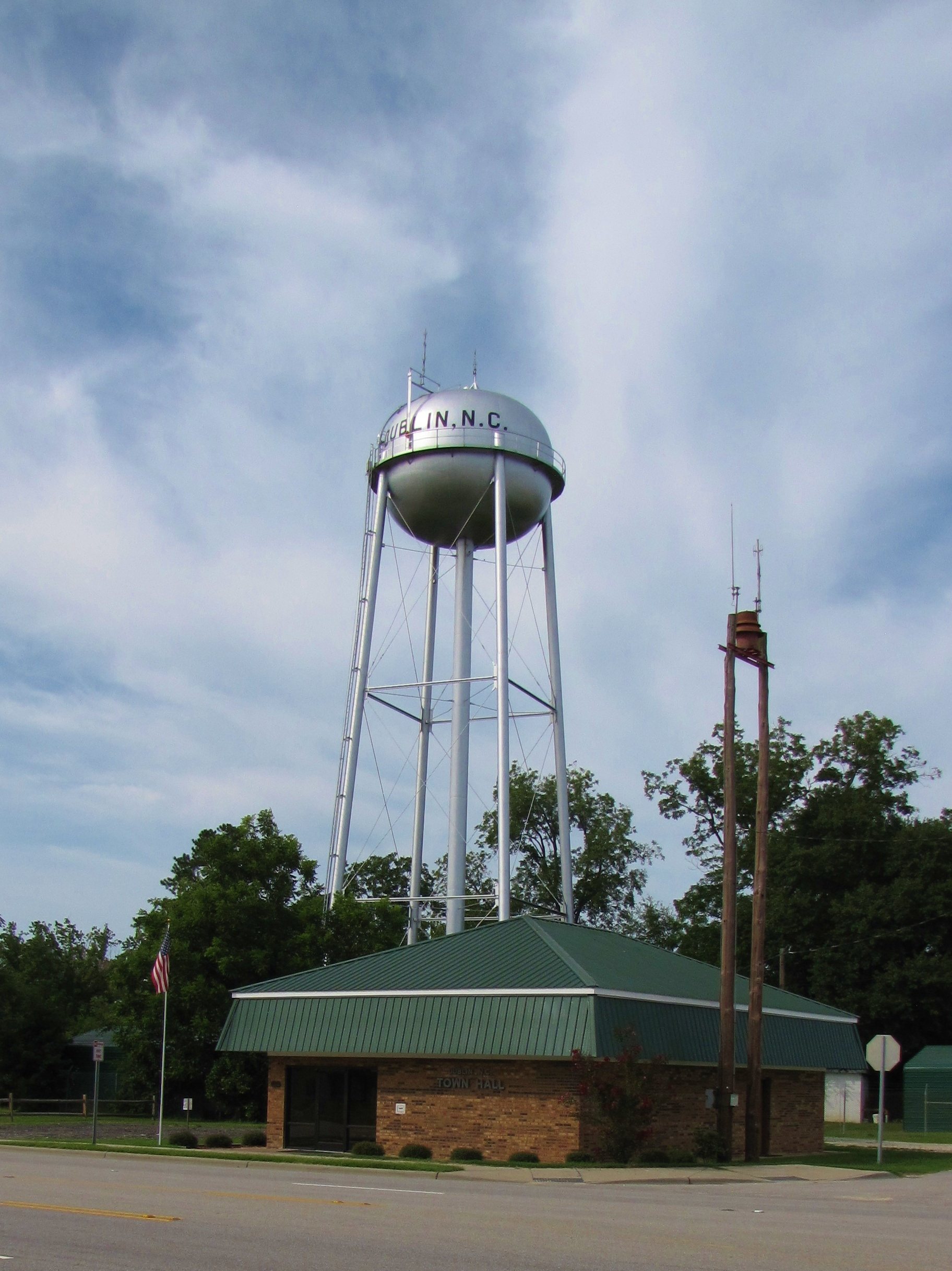
- The town hall and water tower on Albert Street in Dublin

- Location in Bladen County and the state of North Carolina.
- Coordinates: 34°39′22″N 78°43′23″W
- Country: United States
- State: North Carolina
- County: Bladen

Government
  - Mayor: Darryl Dowless

Area
  - Total: 0.44 sq mi (1.13 km^{2})
  - Land: 0.44 sq mi (1.13 km^{2})
  - Water: 0 sq mi (0.00 km^{2})
- Elevation: 138 ft (42 m)

Population (2020)
  - Total: 267
  - Density: 614/sq mi (236.9/km^{2})
- Time zone: UTC-5 (Eastern (EST))
  - Summer (DST): UTC-4 (EDT)
- ZIP code: 28332
- Area codes: 910, 472
- FIPS code: 37-18040
- GNIS feature ID: 2406399

Dublin is a town in Bladen County, North Carolina, United States. At the 2020 census, the town population was 267. Dublin is located on North Carolina Highway 87 and is known as the "Peanut Capital of North Carolina".

== Geography ==
According to the United States Census Bureau, the town has a total area of 0.4 square miles (1.0 km^{2}), all land.

== Demographics ==
Historical population
| Census | Pop. | Note | %± |
|---|---|---|---|
| 1920 | 99 | | — |
| 1930 | 189 | | 90.9% |
| 1940 | 325 | | 72.0% |
| 1950 | 243 | | −25.2% |
| 1960 | 366 | | 50.6% |
| 1970 | 283 | | −22.7% |
| 1980 | 477 | | 68.6% |
| 1990 | 246 | | −48.4% |
| 2000 | 250 | | 1.6% |
| 2010 | 338 | | 35.2% |
| 2020 | 267 | | −21.0% |
U.S. Decennial Census

As of the census of 2010, there were 338 people, 131 households, and 88 families residing in the town. The population density was 845.0 inhabitants per square mile (326.3/km^{2}). There were 145 housing units at an average density of 362.5 per square mile (140.0/km^{2}). The racial makeup of the town was 66.9% White, 19.5% African American, 1.5% Native American, 0.00% Asian, 0.00% Pacific Islander, 9.2% from other races, and 3.0% from two or more races. 10.9% of the population were Hispanic or Latino of any race.

There were 131 households, out of which 29.0% had children under the age of 18 living with them, 42.0% were married couples living together, 19.1% had a female householder with no husband present, and 32.8% were non-families. 29.0% of all households were made up of individuals, and 31.3% had someone living alone who was 65 years of age or older. The average household size was 2.58 and the average family size was 3.19.

In the town, the population was spread out, with 28.1% under the age of 18, 7.20% from 18 to 24, 24.5% from 25 to 44, 24.2% from 45 to 64, and 16.0% who were 65 years of age or older. The median age was 38.8 years.

The median income for a household in the town was $31,771, and the median income for a family was $43,250. The per capita income for the town was $17,512. About 13.6% of the population were below the poverty line.
