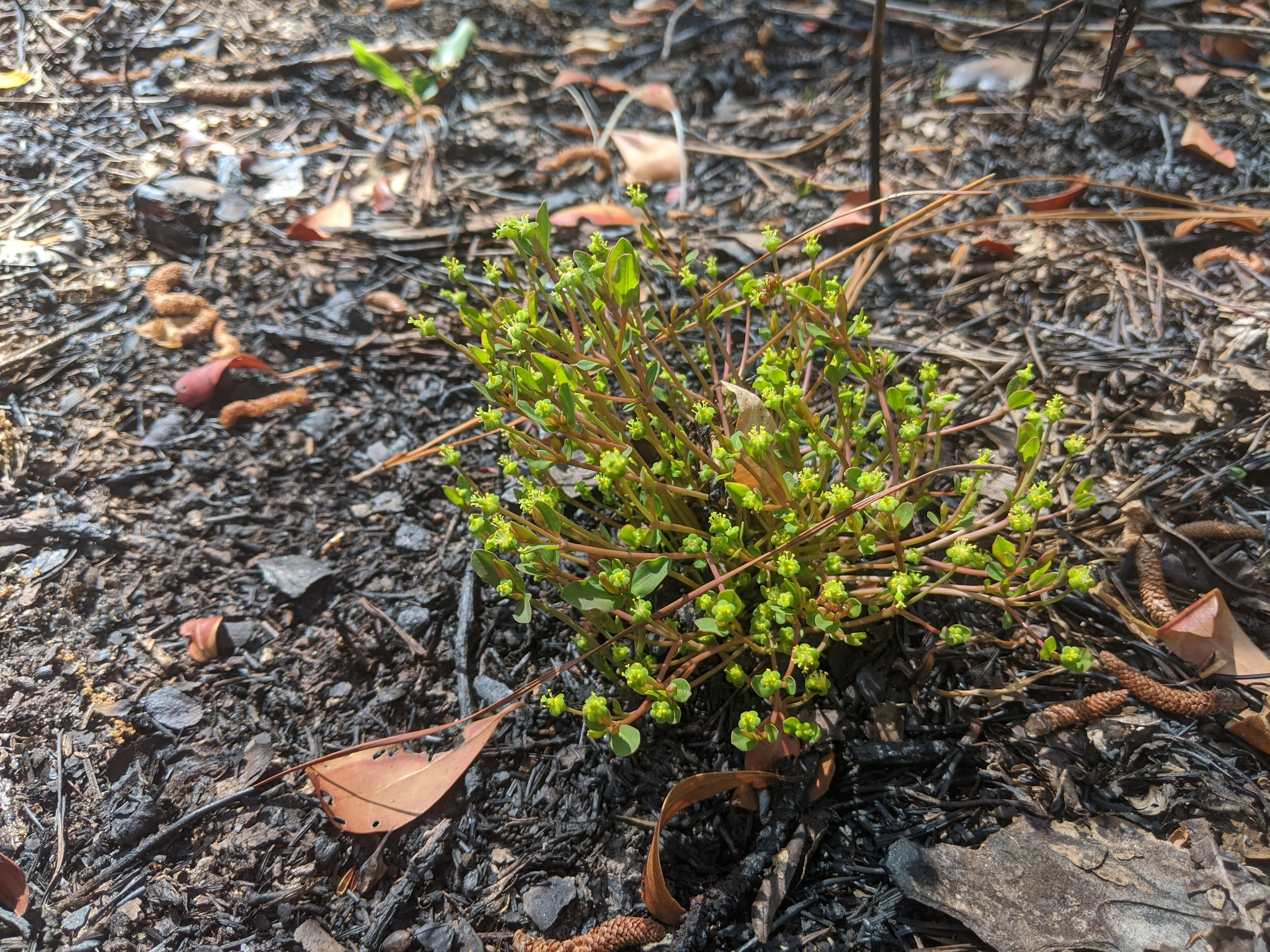

Scientific classification
- Kingdom: Plantae
- Clade: Tracheophytes
- Clade: Angiosperms
- Clade: Eudicots
- Clade: Rosids
- Order: Malpighiales
- Family: Euphorbiaceae
- Genus: Euphorbia
- Species: E. ipecacuanhae

Binomial name
- Euphorbia ipecacuanhae L. (1753)

Synonyms
- Agaloma ipecacuanhae (L.) Nieuwl. (1912); Anisophyllum ipecacuanha (L.) Haw. (1812); Euphorbia atrorubens Engelm. ex Boiss. (1862); Euphorbia ipecacuanhae f. linearis (Moldenke) Fernald (1948); Euphorbia ipecacuanhae var. portulacoides Boiss. (1862); Tithymalopsis ipecacuanhae (L.) Small (1903); Tithymalopsis ipecacuanhae f. linearis Moldenke (1947); Tithymalopsis ipecacuanhae f. orbiculata Moldenke (1948); Tithymalopsis ipecacuanhae f. rubra Moldenke (1949); Tithymalus ipecacuanhae (L.) Klotzsch & Garcke (1860); Vallaris ipecacuanhae (L.) Raf. (1838); Vallaris ipecacuanhae var. linearifolia Raf. (1840)

= Euphorbia ipecacuanhae =

Carolina ipecac

Species of plant

Euphorbia ipecacuanhae, known by the common names of Carolina ipecac, American ipecac, and ipecac spurge, is a member of the spurge family, Euphorbiaceae. It is a perennial herb, native to the seaboard of the eastern United States, from South Carolina to Long Island.

Though it is not closely related to its namesake, Carapichea ipecacuanha, it was often used for the same purpose, with the deep taproot used to create a powerful emetic as a local substitute for imported syrup of ipecac.
