= Kelly, North Carolina =

- Census-designated place
- Location in Bladen County and the state of North Carolina.
- Coordinates: 34°27′50″N 78°18′39″W
- Country: United States
- State: North Carolina
- County: Bladen

Area
  - Total: 11.59 sq mi (30.02 km^{2})
  - Land: 11.59 sq mi (30.02 km^{2})
  - Water: 0 sq mi (0.00 km^{2})
- Elevation: 23 ft (7.0 m)

Population (2020)
  - Total: 446
  - Density: 38.5/sq mi (14.86/km^{2})
- Time zone: UTC-5 (Eastern (EST))
  - Summer (DST): UTC-4 (EDT)
- ZIP code: 28448
- Area codes: 910, 472
- FIPS code: 37-35440
- GNIS feature ID: 2403166

Kelly is a census-designated place (CDP) in Bladen County, North Carolina, United States. The population was 446 at the 2020 census.

== Geography ==
According to the United States Census Bureau, the CDP has a total area of 11.6 square miles (30 km^{2}), all land.

== Demographics ==
Historical population
Census	Pop.	Note	%±
2020	446		—
U.S. Decennial Census

As of the census of 2000, there were 454 people, 205 households, and 138 families residing in the CDP. The population density was 39.2 inhabitants per square mile (15.1/km^{2}). There were 244 housing units at an average density of 21.1/sq mi (8.1/km^{2}). The racial makeup of the CDP was 50.66% White, 46.92% African American, 0.44% Native American, 0.22% Pacific Islander, 1.76% from other races. Hispanic or Latino of any race were 1.76% of the population.

There were 205 households, out of which 21.5% had children under the age of 18 living with them, 46.8% were married couples living together, 17.6% had a female householder with no husband present, and 32.2% were non-families. 31.2% of all households were made up of individuals, and 12.7% had someone living alone who was 65 years of age or older. The average household size was 2.21 and the average family size was 2.73.

In the CDP, the population was spread out, with 17.2% under the age of 18, 7.5% from 18 to 24, 24.7% from 25 to 44, 30.4% from 45 to 64, and 20.3% who were 65 years of age or older. The median age was 46 years. For every 100 females, there were 90.0 males. For every 100 females age 18 and over, there were 87.1 males.

The median income for a household in the CDP was $27,143, and the median income for a family was $52,857. Males had a median income of $26,310 versus $21,563 for females. The per capita income for the CDP was $21,900. About 5.8% of families and 11.5% of the population were below the poverty line, including 7.0% of those under age 18 and 28.0% of those age 65 or over.
