= Headwaters State Forest =

Protected area in North Carolina, United States

- IUCN category VI (protected area with sustainable use of natural resources)
- Location within North Carolina Location within the United States
- Location: Transylvania, North Carolina, United States
- Coordinates: 35.0967°N 82.7356°W
- Area: 6,730 acres (27.2 km^{2})
- Established: 2009
- Governing body: North Carolina Forest Service
- Website: Headwaters State Forest

Headwaters State Forest is a 6,730-acre (27.2 km^{2}) state forest, located in Transylvania County, North Carolina, along the South Carolina state line and is part of a larger 100,000+ acre conservation corridor that stretches some 80 miles along the state line. The name originates from the fact that the forest contains the headwaters of East Fork of the French Broad River. The North Carolina Forest Service primarily manages the forest for water and soil quality, as well as protecting rare species; however, primitive recreational uses are permitted.

== History ==
The forest was established in 2009 when Congressman Charles H. Taylor agreed to sell about 8,000 acres (32 km^{2}) to the state, which was one of the largest remaining tracts of privately held land in Western North Carolina. Over the next 9 years, The Conservation Fund and Conserving Carolina assisted with the acquisition, by purchasing portions of the property as grants became available, then turning them over to the North Carolina Forest Service. A small, 4.8-acre (0.019 km^{2}) portion of the property around the summit of Sassafras Mountain was given to the South Carolina Department of Natural Resources for development of an observation tower at South Carolina's highest point.

On September 8, 2018, the beginning of deer season, Headwaters State Forest was opened to the public.

== Recreation ==
The forest is open to hiking, hunting and fishing. Mountain biking, horse back riding and off-roading are not permitted. The NC Forest Service plans on maintaining the forest in a primitive, undeveloped state with few visitor facilities.

A spur of the Foothills Trail follows along the southern boundary of the forest, connecting Sassafras Mountain to Caesars Head State Park (SC).

There are several waterfalls in the forest, including East Fork Falls, Reece Place Falls and Graveley Falls.

Bursted Rock is regarded as the most scenic vantage point in the forest.

== Nearby state parks ==
The following state parks and state forests are within 30 miles (48 km) of Headwaters State Forest:

- Caesars Head State Park (South Carolina)
- Devils Fork State Park (South Carolina)
- DuPont State Recreational Forest (North Carolina)
- Gorges State Park (North Carolina)
- Holmes Educational State Forest (North Carolina)
- Horsepasture State Natural River (North Carolina)
- Jones Gap State Park (South Carolina)
- Keowee-Toxaway State Park (South Carolina)
- Oconee State Park (South Carolina)
- Oconee Station State Historic Site (South Carolina)
- Paris Mountain State Park (South Carolina)
- Pisgah View State Park (North Carolina)
- Poe Creek State Forest (South Carolina)
- Table Rock State Park (South Carolina)

== See also ==
- Pisgah National Forest
