= Holmes Educational State Forest =

Protected area in North Carolina, United States

- IUCN category VI (protected area with sustainable use of natural resources)
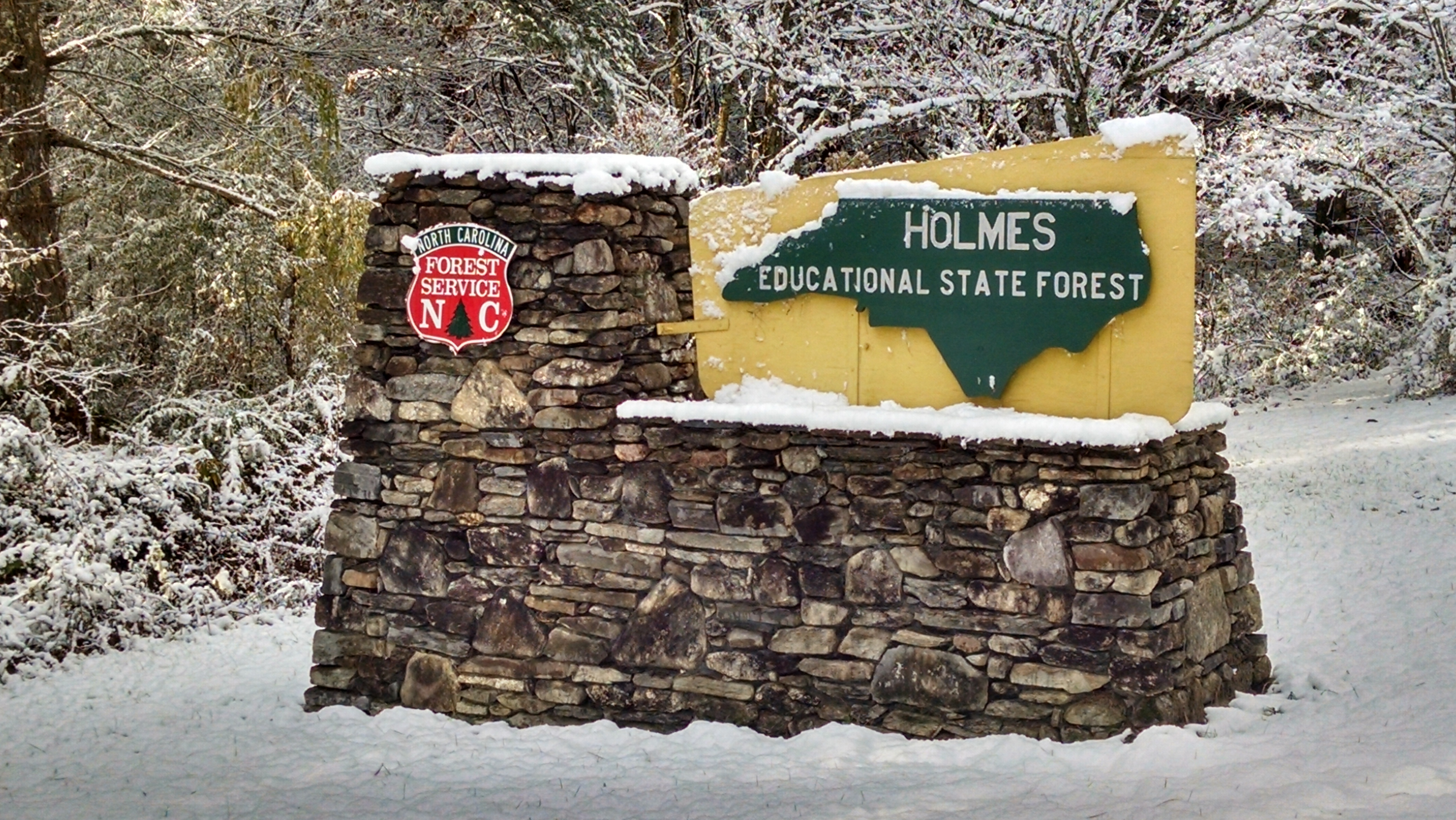

- Location within North Carolina Location within the United States
- Location: Henderson, North Carolina, United States
- Coordinates: 35°14′22″N 82°34′34″W
- Area: 235 acres (95 ha)
- Established: 1977
- Named for: Dr. John S. Holmes
- Visitors: 36,244
- Governing body: North Carolina Forest Service
- Website: Holmes Educational State Forest

Holmes Educational State Forest (HESF) is a 235-acre (0.95 km^{2}) state forest, located in Henderson County, North Carolina. It is near the much larger DuPont State Recreational Forest, which is responsible for its management. The forest is in the Blue Ridge Mountains, and it has rugged terrain with a mixture of hardwood forest, rhododendron, and flame azalea.

The forest's primary purpose is education and promotion of forest resources. Forest rangers regularly conduct outdoor classes for schools and other groups from spring to fall. The forest also has self-guided interpretive trails, which teach visitors about forestry through the use of trail-side exhibits, displays and audio boxes. In addition, the forest offers a small network of hiking trails, a picnic area with a shelter and a group campground.

The state originally purchased the forest in 1938 to establish a tree nursery, which was subsequently constructed by the Civilian Conservation Corps. The state received a federal grant in 1972 to convert the nursery into an educational state forest. The forest was opened in May 1977, during its dedication to North Carolina's first state forester, Dr. John S. Holmes.

== Nearby state parks ==
The following state parks and state forests are within 30 miles (48 km) of Holmes Educational State Forest:

- Caesars Head State Park (South Carolina)
- Chimney Rock State Park (North Carolina)
- Devils Fork State Park (South Carolina)
- DuPont State Recreational Forest (North Carolina)
- Gorges State Park (North Carolina)
- Headwaters State Forest (North Carolina)
- Horsepasture State Natural River (North Carolina)
- Jones Gap State Park (South Carolina)
- Keowee-Toxaway State Park (South Carolina)
- Paris Mountain State Park (South Carolina)
- Pisgah View State Park (North Carolina)
- Poe Creek State Forest (South Carolina)
- Table Rock State Park (South Carolina)

== See also ==
- DuPont State Forest (Manages Holmes)
