= Jordan Lake Educational State Forest =

Protected area in North Carolina, United States

- IUCN category VI (protected area with sustainable use of natural resources)
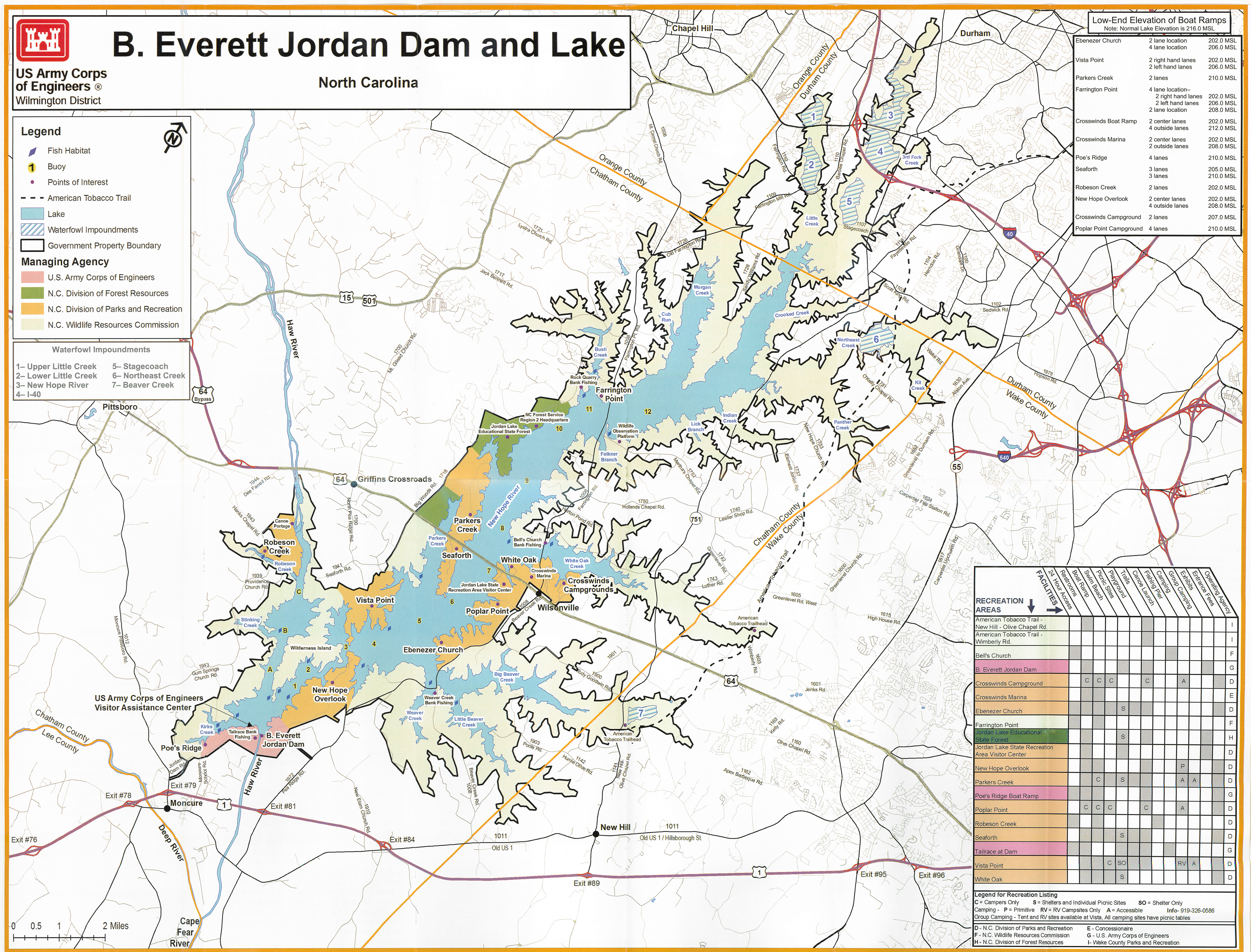
- Recreational map of Jordan Lake. The forest is depicted in green.

- Location within North Carolina
- Location: Chatham, North Carolina, United States
- Coordinates: 35°46′15″N 079°02′26″W
- Area: 900 acres (360 ha)
- Named for: Jordan Lake
- Governing body: North Carolina Forest Service
- Website: Jordan Lake Educational State Forest

The Jordan Lake Educational State Forest (JLESF) is a 900-acre (3.6 km^{2}) is a North Carolinian State Forest near Apex, North Carolina. It is located beside the over 46,768 acre (186 km²) Jordan Lake.

== See also ==
- Jordan Lake State Recreation Area
- Jordan Lake
