= Bladen Lakes State Forest =

Protected area in North Carolina, United States

- IUCN category VI (protected area with sustainable use of natural resources)
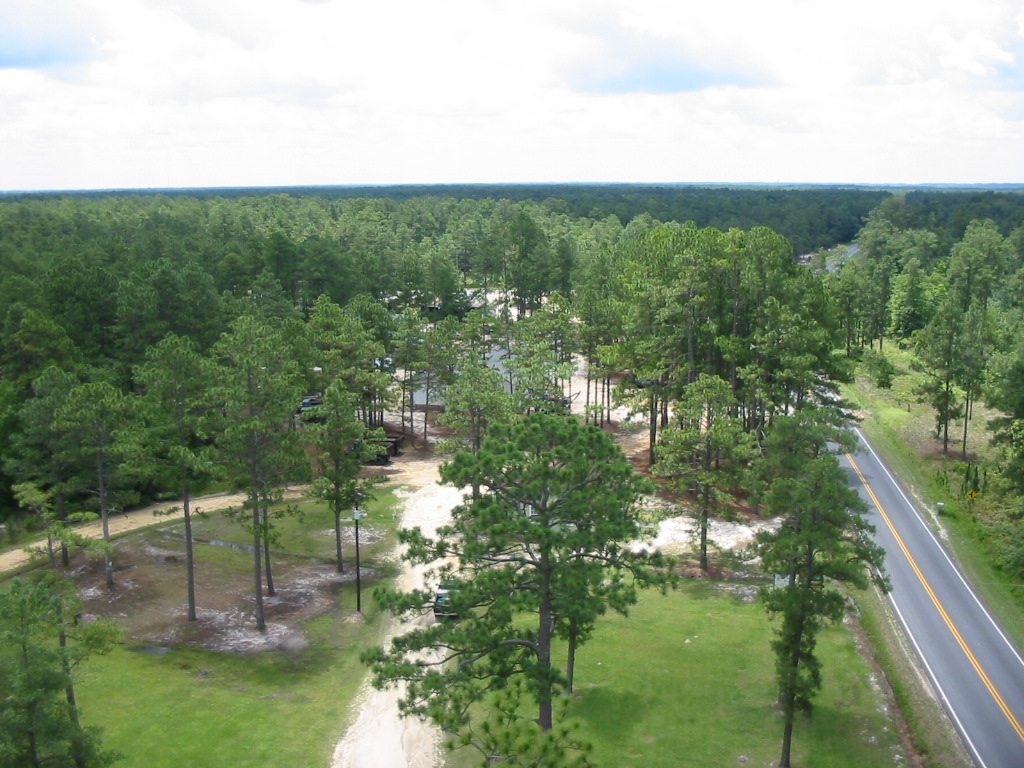
- View from Fire Tower towards Elizabethtown

- Location within North Carolina
- Location: Bladen County, North Carolina, United States
- Coordinates: 34°41′18″N 78°35′40″W
- Area: 32,950 acres (133.3 km^{2})
- Elevation: 15–115 ft (4.6–35.1 m)
- Established: 1954
- Named for: Carolina Bay
- Governing body: North Carolina Department of Agriculture and Consumer Services; North Carolina Forest Service
- Website: Bladen Lakes State Forest

Bladen Lakes State Forest (BLSF) is a North Carolina state forest near Elizabethtown, North Carolina, United States. It is managed by the North Carolina Forest Service. Covering about 33,450 acres (13,540 ha), it is the largest state owned forest in North Carolina. Bladen Lakes comprises three parcels of land and has a total of eight compartments. Adjoining the forest are Turnbull Creek Educational State Forest, Jones Lake State Park and Singletary Lake State Park. The vast majority of the forest is in the Game Lands Program, which is administered by the North Carolina Wildlife Resources Commission. There are several safety zones where hunting is prohibited or restricted (archery zones, hunting areas for disabled persons and still hunting only areas).

Bladen Lakes State Forest is a working forest, which means it is actively managed and creates its own income. Yearly revenues are generated through timber sales, pine straw sales and cooking of charcoal. It is an active partner in the Forest Stewardship Program contributing significantly to the regions clean water and air, protection of the soil, wildlife habitat, recreational resources and timber supplies.

The general public is invited to visit the forest and enjoy the scenery and multitude of landscape features, like the Carolina bays, pocosins, sand ridges, river bottoms and swamps. Horseback riding and camping at designated places is welcomed. Street legal vehicles can be used on the 100+ miles of roads and trails as long as these are not behind closed gates. There is a long list of other activities people can do at Bladen Lakes. Some use the lack of lights in the forest for star gazing at night. Several universities, community colleges and other scientific organizations have study sites within the forest boundaries. Several agencies and the military use the forest as training ground. Many activities other than hunting require a Special Use Permit, which can be obtained from the office free of charge during regular office hours.

Map of Bladen Lakes State Forest

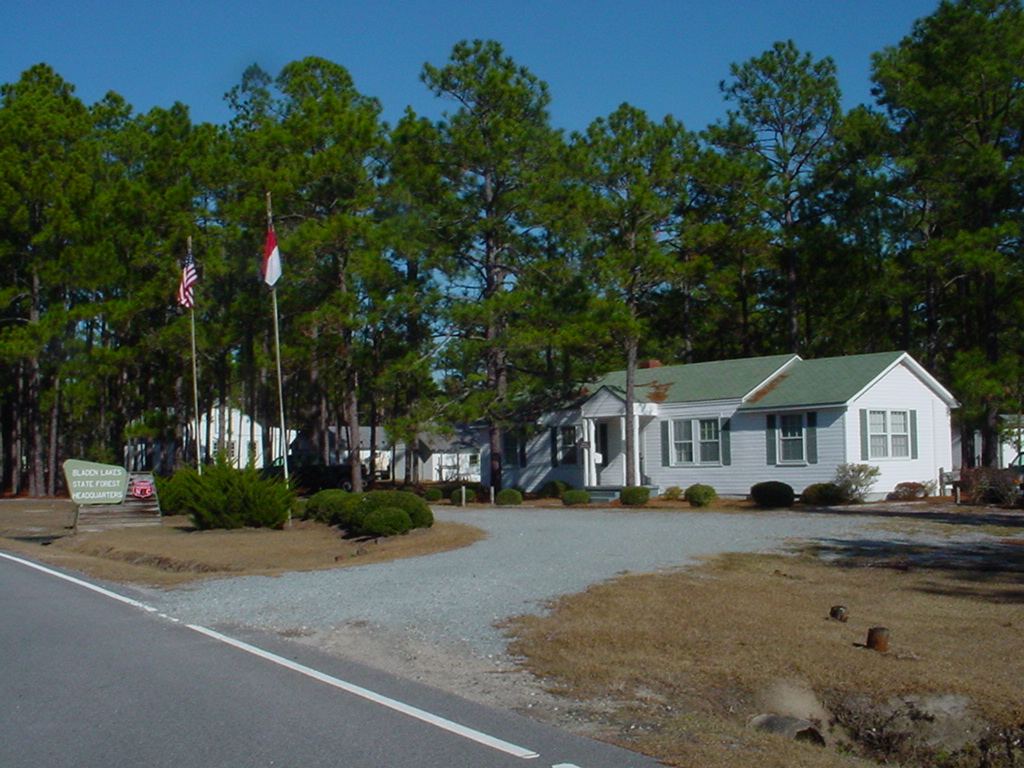
Bladen Lakes State Forest office

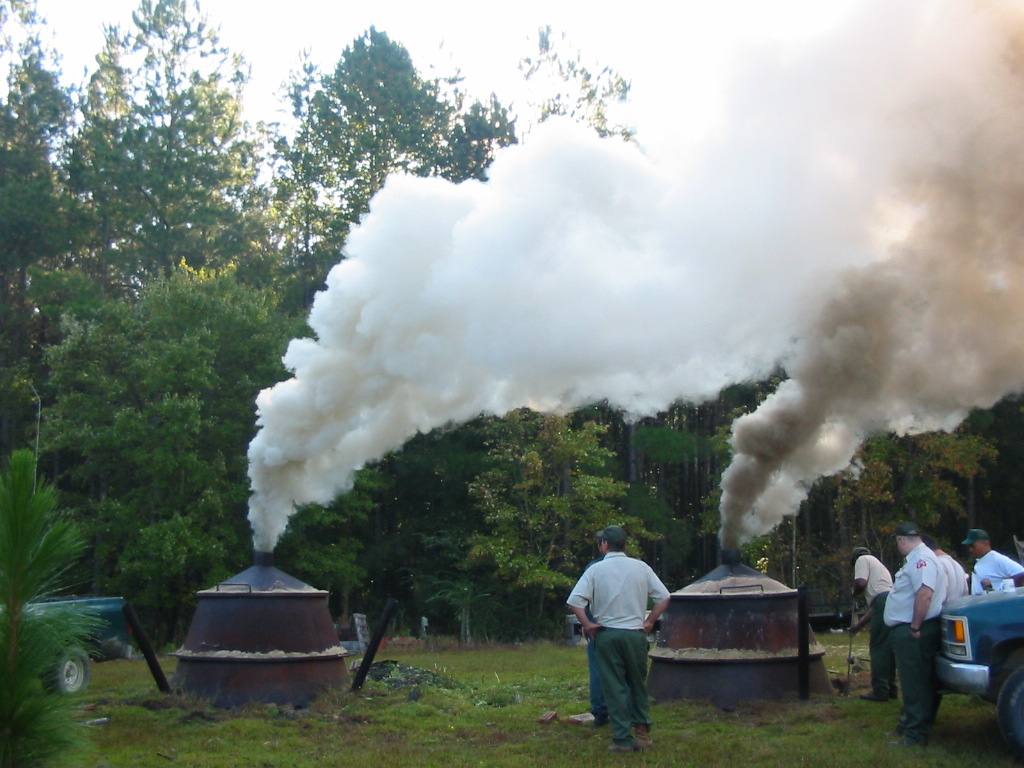
Charcoal cooking at Bladen Lakes State Forest

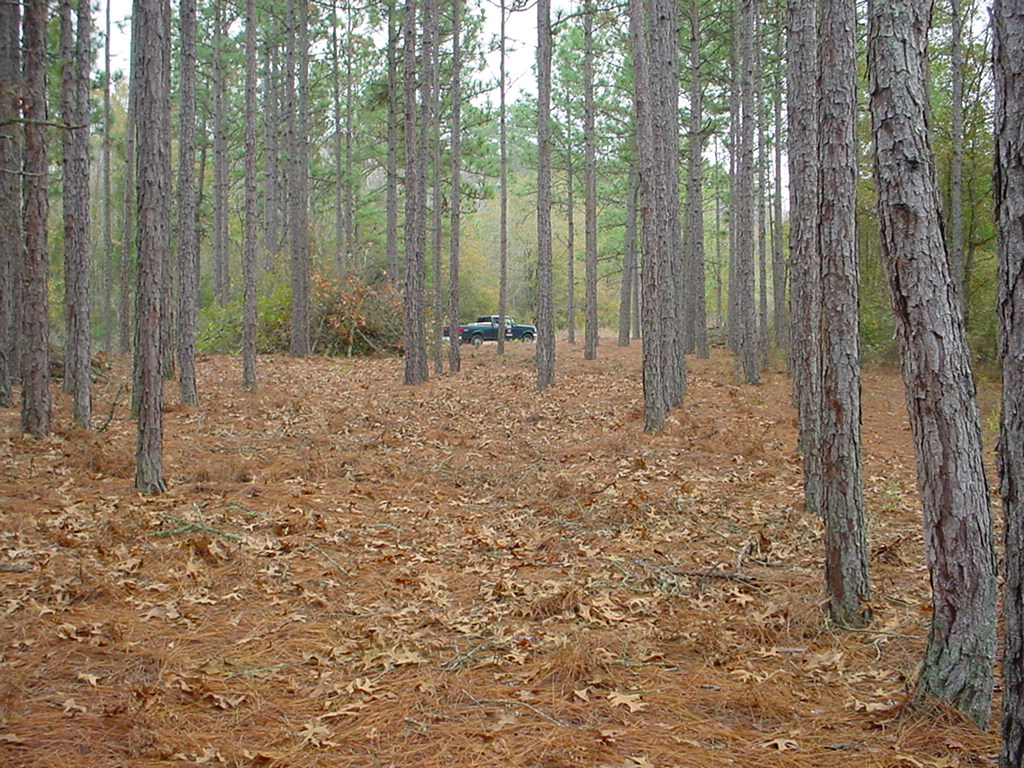
Longleaf pine stand at Bladen Lakes State Forest

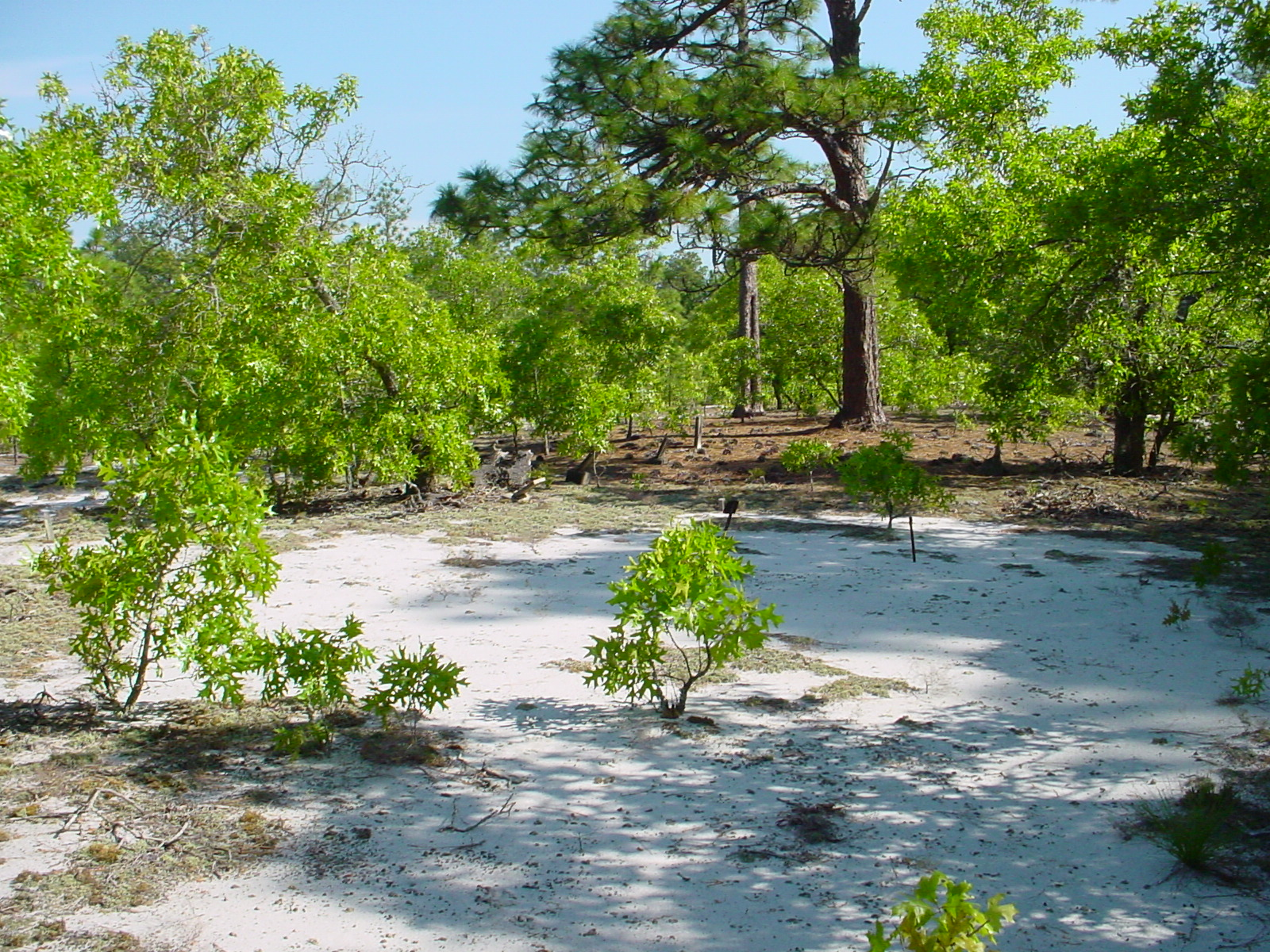
Old cemetery near the BLSF office

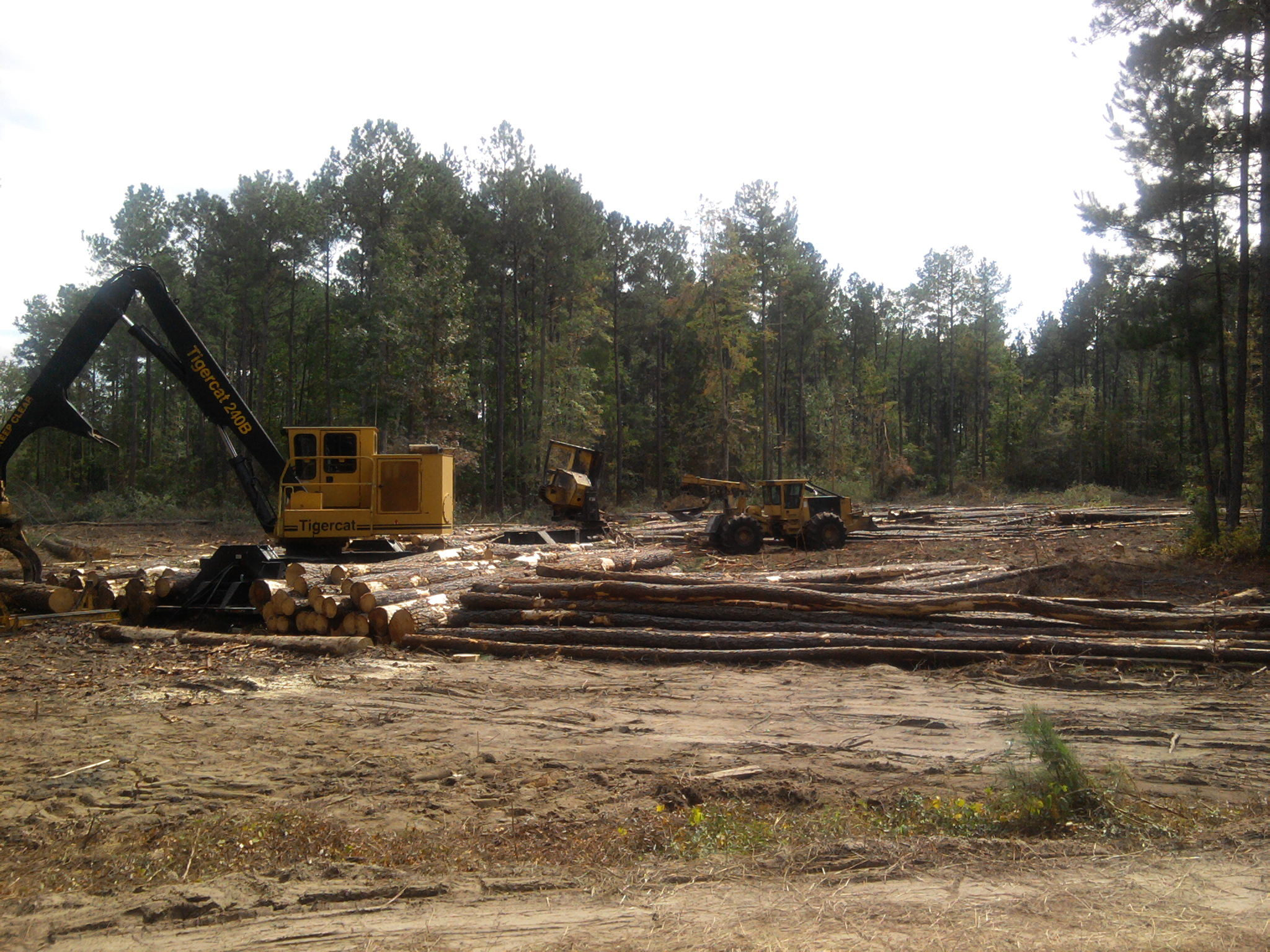
Logging operation at BLSF

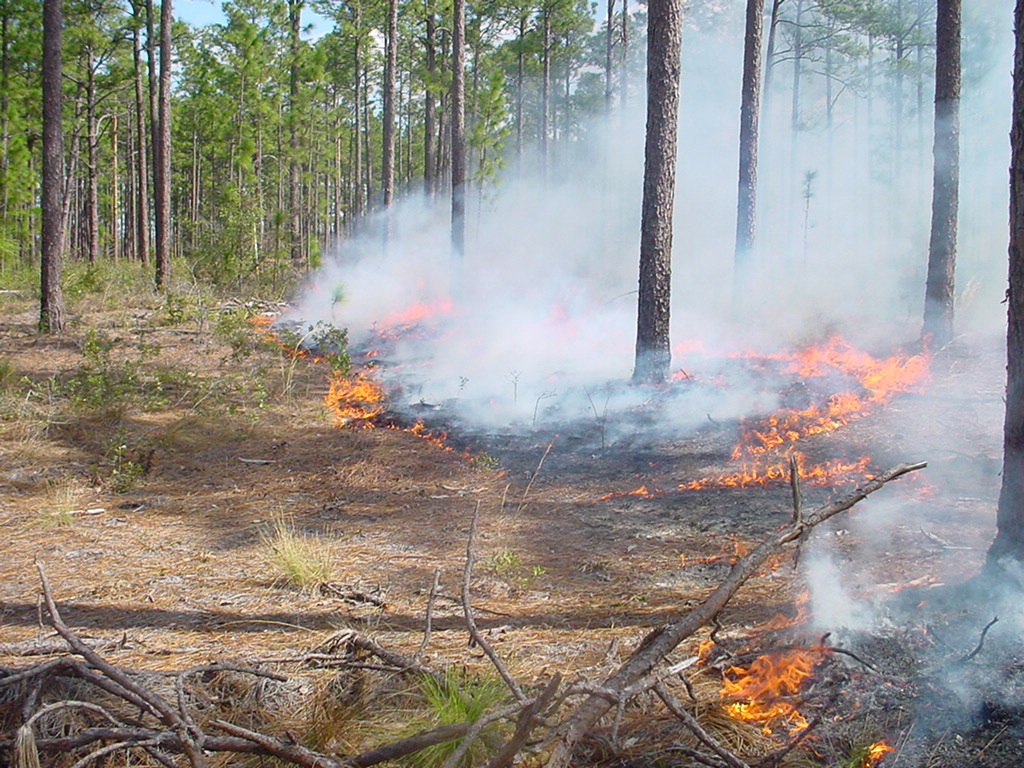
Prescribed burning on BLSF

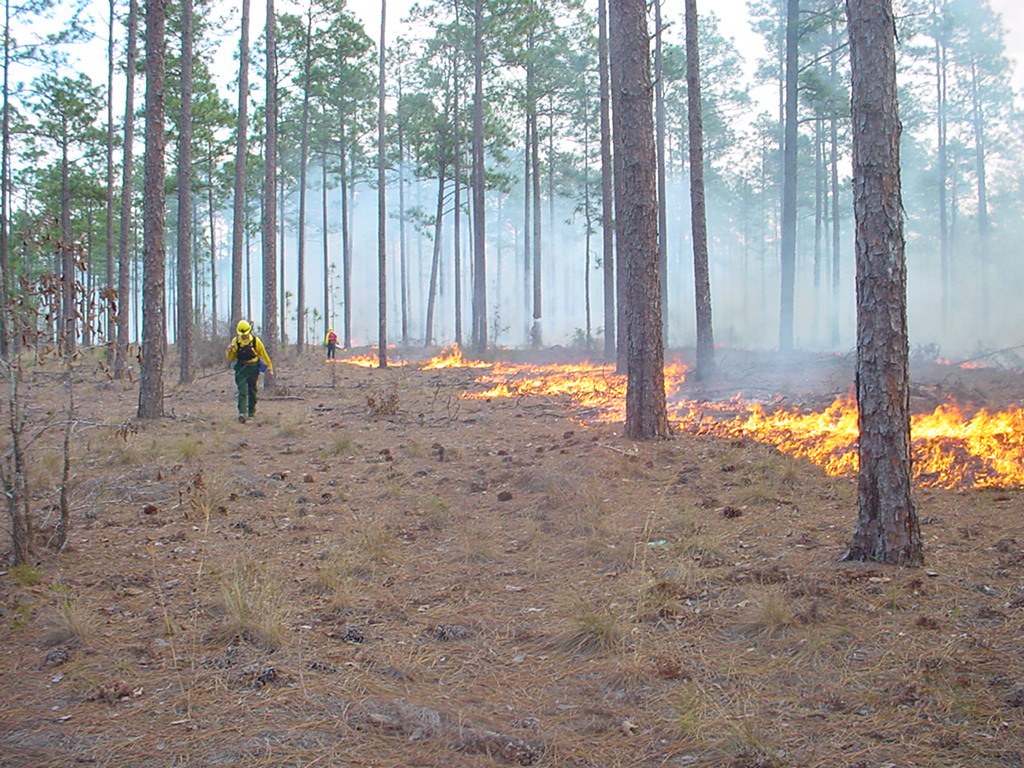
Prescribed burning on BLSF

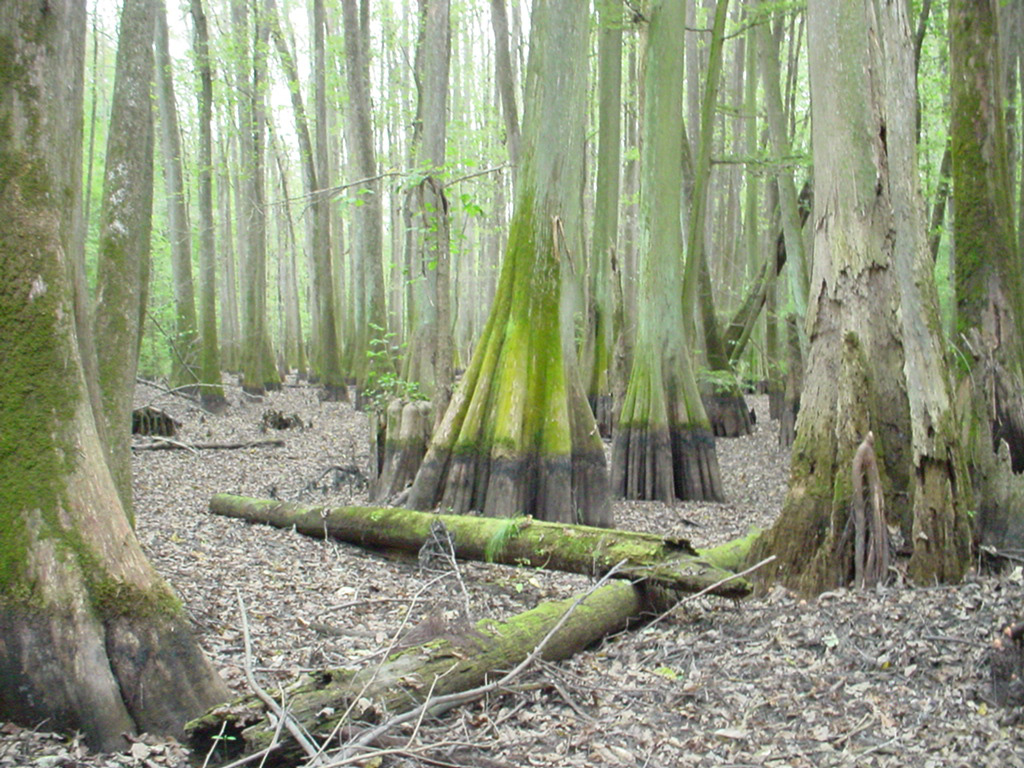
Cypress swamp on Bladen Lakes State Forest

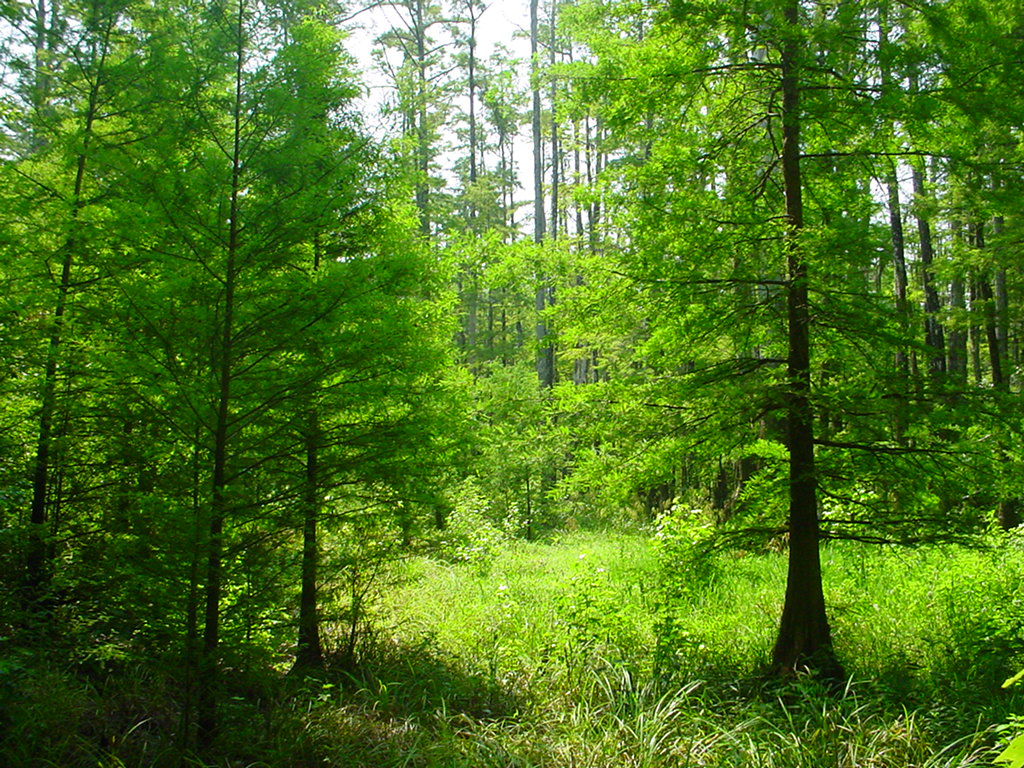
Cypress swamp on Bladen Lakes State Forest in early summer

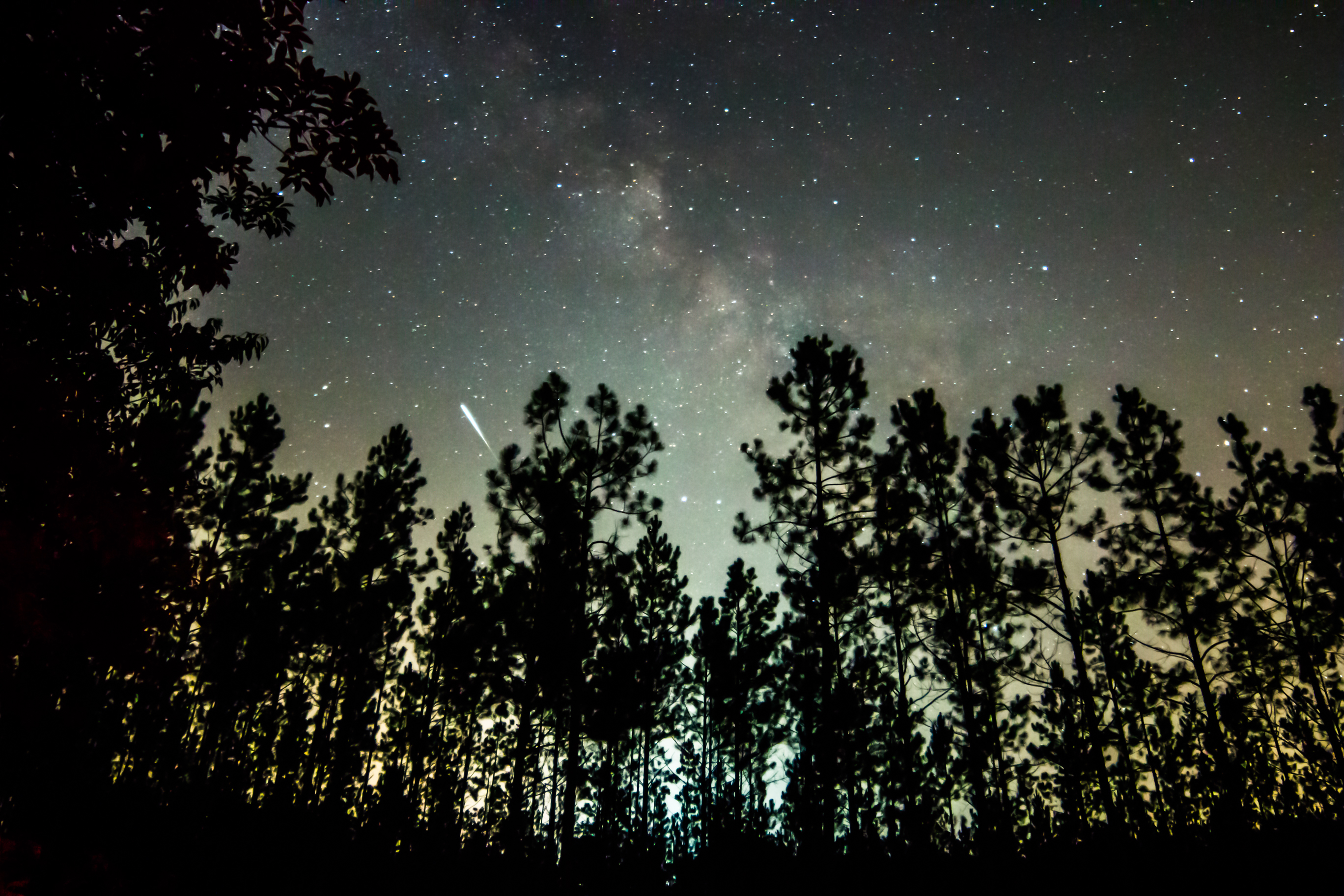
Picture taken during Perseids meteor shower event (August 14, 2015)
