= Clemmons Educational State Forest =

Protected area in North Carolina, United States

- IUCN category VI (protected area with sustainable use of natural resources)
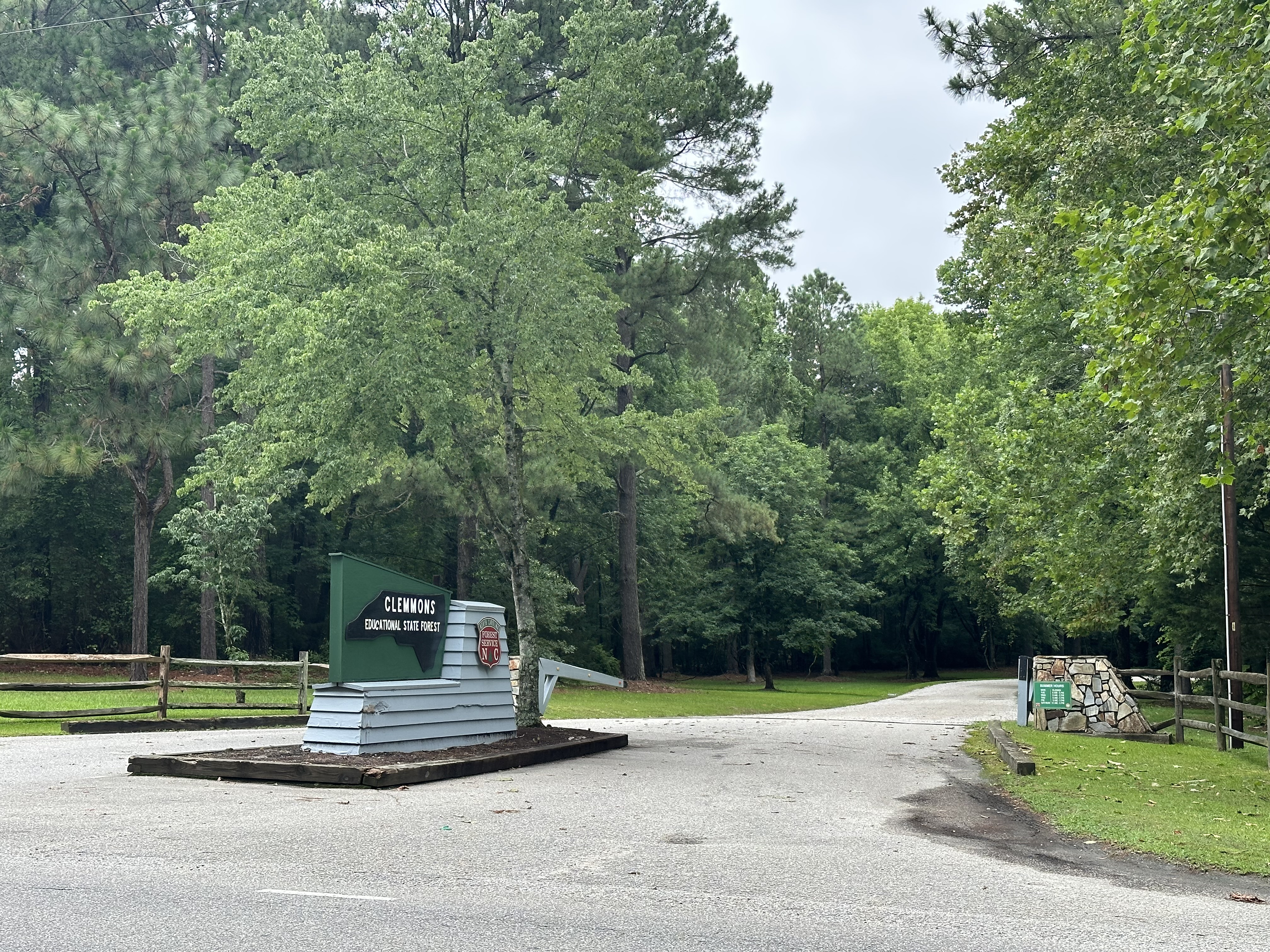

- Location within North Carolina
- Location: Johnston & Wake, North Carolina, United States
- Coordinates: 35°40′26″N 078°29′20″W
- Area: 825 acres (334 ha)
- Established: 1977
- Governing body: North Carolina Forest Service
- Website: Clemmons Educational State Forest

Clemmons Educational State Forest (CESF) is a 825-acre (3.34 km^{2}) North Carolina State Forest in Clayton. It is North Carolina's first educational state forest, and it is operated by the North Carolina Forest Service. The site features self-guided nature trails with audio exhibit stations, the Forestry Exhibit Center with interactive exhibits about the ecology of forests, soil, water, wildlife and the state's cultural history.

== Amenities ==
There are 4 main trails with 8 miles of hiking available. The two audio trails ("Talking Trees" trail and the "Talking Rocks" trail) feature recorded messages about the history of the forest and trees as well as geology of North Carolina. The Forest Demonstration trail shows actual forestry practices, while the Watershed Extension loop features streams, hills, and other interesting sites. There are picnic sites as well as a large covered picnic shelter available for the public to use. Another interesting feature is a large 40 feet by 24 feet deck overlooking a 3-acre pond with a large map of North Carolina showing all of the river basins in the state. Children and adults enjoy feeding the fish from the deck also. Forest rangers offer education programs for school groups.

== Geography ==
Clemmons Educational State Forest sits in a unique geographical location of North Carolina, bordering both the Piedmont and Innercoastal Plain regions. Thus, the forest shares key floral and faunal species from both regions.

== Habitat ==
Clemmons is primarily a coniferous woodland, which usually generate in dry, humid climates. The soil is commonly more acidic in nature, and is mixed with many rocks and sediments. The 3-acre pond farm helps with flood control due to the Forest's flat nature.

== Prominent Floral Species of the Piedmont/Inner Coastal Plain Regions of NC ==
=== Loblolly Pine (Pinus taeda) ===
The Loblolly pine is a coniferous tree that is native to both the Piedmont and Intercoastal Plain regions of North Carolina. It has yellow-green leaves and a brick-colored cone.

=== Longleaf Pine (Pinus palustris) ===
Similar to the Loblolly, the Longleaf Pine is a coniferous tree with red-brown cones. However, this tree prefers dry, sandy soil, which is found primarily in the Inner Coastal Plain region of NC. The Longleaf's cones are the biggest in the Eastern United States, ranging from six to ten inches in length. The needles are thick and bushy at the ends of the branches.

=== Sweetgum (Liquidambar styraciflua) ===
Sweetgums are abundant deciduous trees that grow all over North Carolina. They boast green, star like leaves and bright yellow flowers. They are fruit bearing, with spherical seeds and a "gumball" of fruit that is released once the seed drops.

== Prominent Faunal Species of the Piedmont/Inner Coastal Plain Regions of NC ==
=== Eastern Box Turtle (Terrapene carolina) ===
Ranging across the East Coast, the Eastern Box Turtle is found primarily in dry, sandy forests. In 1979, they were selected as the NC State reptile for being the only terrestrial turtle native to the area.They typically are identified by their yellow and black shells and their flat, round appearance. Their life expectancy is usually 25-30 years.

=== Largemouth Bass (Micropterus salmoides) ===
The Largemouth Bass is found in ponds and rivers across the State. They are the most sought after gamefish in the US. They belong to the general bass family, which have long lower jaws and a notched dorsal fin. They prefer water temperatures between seventy-seven and eighty-six degrees.
