= Turnbull Creek Educational State Forest =

Protected area in North Carolina, United States

- IUCN category VI (protected area with sustainable use of natural resources)
- Location within North Carolina
- Location: Bladen, North Carolina, United States
- Coordinates: 34°41′01″N 078°34′59″W
- Area: 890 acres (360 ha)
- Named for: Turnbull Creek
- Governing body: North Carolina Forest Service
- Website: Turnbull Creek Educational State Forest

Turnbull Creek Educational State Forest (TCESF) is a 890-acre (3.6 km^{2}) North Carolina State Forest in Elizabethtown, North Carolina. It is the only educational state forest located in North Carolina's coastal plain. Jones Lake State Park is adjacent to the forest, and both are surrounded by Bladen Lakes State Forest. The forest's primary purpose is public education of forestry practices.

Area map of Bladen Lakes State Forest in Elizabethtown
