= List of North Carolina state forests =

The State of North Carolina has a group of twelve protected areas known as state forests which are managed by the North Carolina Forest Service, an agency of the North Carolina Department of Agriculture and Consumer Services. Six of the state forests are known as State Educational Forests and they are primarily used to educate the public about the forest environment, forestry, and forest management. One state forest, DuPont, was designated as a State Recreational Forest in recognition of its high recreational value and use. Most of the state forests provide recreational facilities for hiking and picnicking.

== North Carolina state forests ==
Name	Region	Counties	Size	Public access
Backbone Ridge State Forest	Mountains	Caldwell	476 acres (1.93 km^{2})	No public access
Bladen Lakes State Forest	Coastal Plain	Bladen	32,700 acres (132 km^{2})	Open year-round via permit
Clemmons Educational State Forest	Piedmont	Johnston, Wake	825 acres (3.34 km^{2})	Open year-round
DuPont State Recreational Forest	Mountains	Henderson, Transylvania	10,473 acres (42.38 km^{2})	Open year-round
Gill State Forest	Mountains	Avery	474 acres (1.92 km^{2})	Not open to the general public
Headwaters State Forest	Mountains	Transylvania	6,730 acres (27.2 km^{2})	Open year-round
Holmes Educational State Forest	Mountains	Henderson	235 acres (0.95 km^{2})	Open year-roud
Jordan Lake Educational State Forest	Piedmont	Chatham	900 acres (3.6 km^{2})	Open year-round
Mountain Island Educational State Forest	Piedmont	Lincoln, Gaston	2,000 acres (8.1 km^{2})	Open year-round
Turnbull Creek Educational State Forest	Coastal Plain	Bladen	890 acres (3.6 km^{2})	Open year-round
Tuttle Educational State Forest	Mountains	Caldwell	288 acres (1.17 km^{2})	Open year-round

== See also ==
- List of national forests of the United States
- List of North Carolina state parks
