= Jordan Lake State Recreation Area =

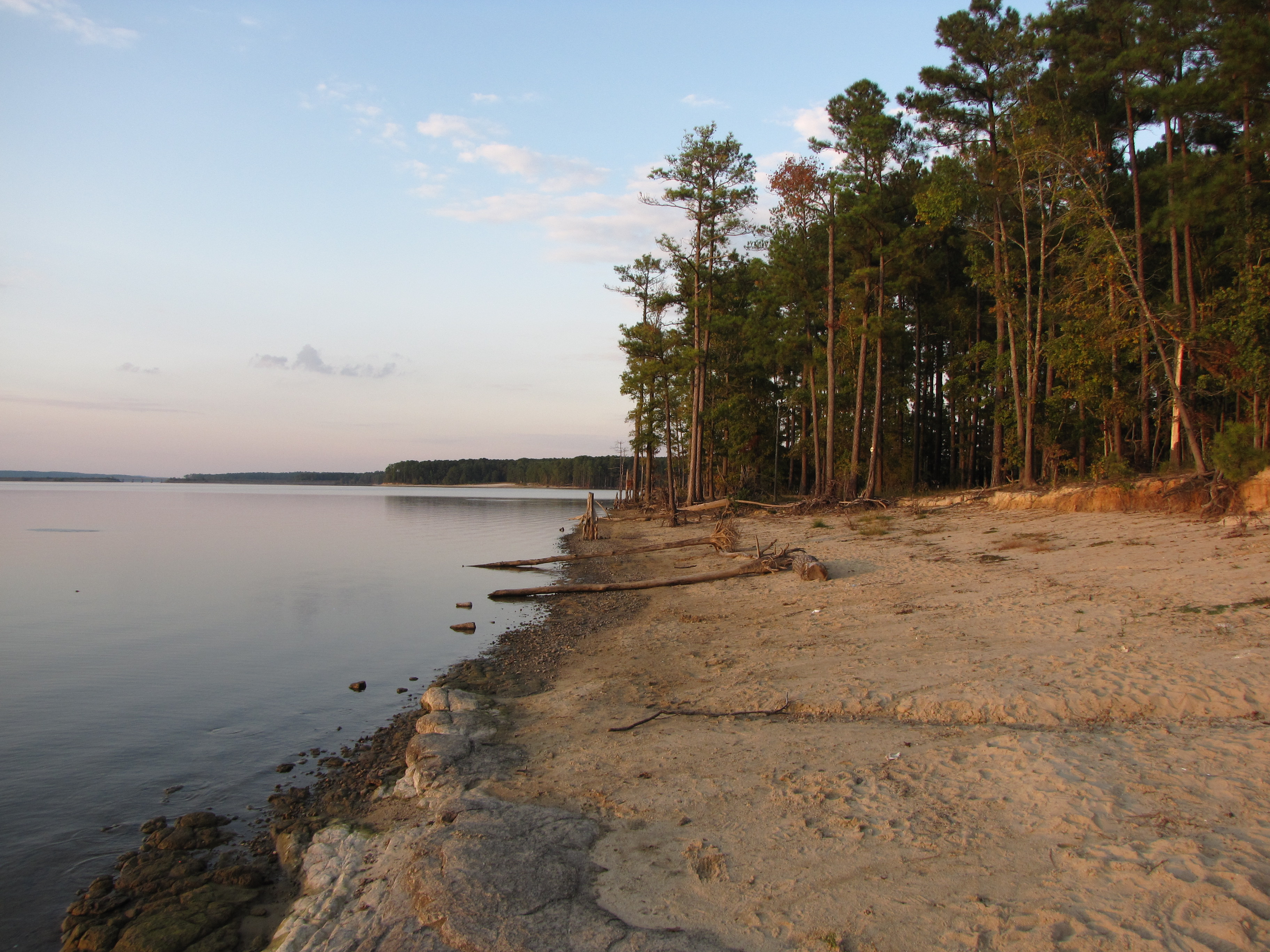
- View from Ebenezer Church shoreline

- Location within North Carolina Location within the United States
- Interactive map of Jordan Lake State Recreation Area
- Location: Chatham, and Wake counties, North Carolina, United States
- Coordinates: 35°44′13″N 79°01′01″W
- Area: 4,558 acres (1,845 ha)
- Elevation: 216 ft (66 m)
- Established: 1981
- Administrator: North Carolina Division of Parks and Recreation
- Named for: B. Everett Jordan
- Website: Official website

Jordan Lake State Recreation Area is a North Carolina state park spanning Chatham County, and Wake County, North Carolina. It comprises 4,558 acres (18.45 km^{2}) of woodlands along the shores of 13,940-acre (56 km^{2}) Jordan Lake.

== History ==
The New Hope River Valley, now home to the corporate world of Research Triangle Park, has been the site of a broad range of cultures for more than 10,000 years. Archaeologists have explored the remains of 450 prehistoric and historic sites in the area and have uncovered many Native American artifacts. The land was settled by Scottish Highlanders in the 1740s, and it saw action in both the Revolutionary and Civil wars.

Following a disastrous hurricane, which struck the Cape Fear River Basin in 1945, Congress directed the U.S. Army Corps of Engineers to undertake a comprehensive study of water resource needs in the area. The project, then known as New Hope Lake, was authorized in 1963 and construction began in 1967. In 1973, the name of the project was changed to B. Everett Jordan Dam and Lake in honor of the former senator from North Carolina.

Jordan Lake Park's 46,768 acres (18,926 ha) are not only a popular source of recreation, they also provide the water supply for surrounding cities, flood and water quality control, and fish and wildlife conservation.

== Recreational use ==
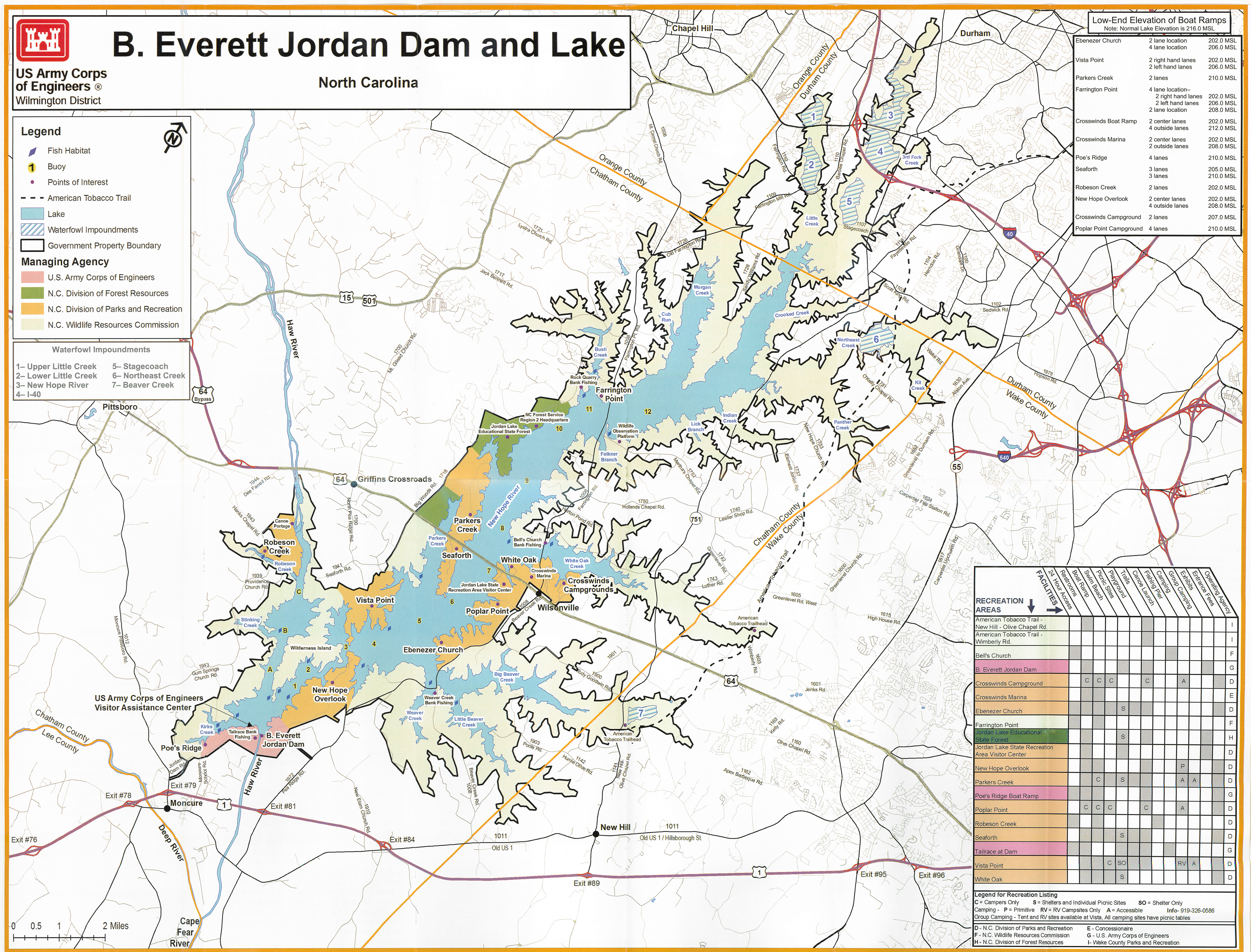
Recreational map of Jordan Lake. State park lands are depicted in tan.

The Jordan Lake State Recreation Area is divided into several smaller areas: Farrington Point, Crosswinds, White Oak, Poplar Point, Ebenezer Church, New Hope Overlook and Poes ridge along the eastern shoreline and Robeson Creek, Vista Point, Seaforth, Parkers Creek, and the Jordan Lake Educational State Forest along the western shore. Swimming, boating, hiking, fishing, hunting, birdwatching and picnicking are popular activities making up 3 Boat ramps, 1 canoe launch, 2 swim beaches, 2 play grounds, 3 fishing piers (including an ADA accessible one), a marina, and 5 campgrounds. Facilities are managed by North Carolina Division of Parks and Recreation, North Carolina Wildlife Resources Commission, North Carolina Division of Forest Resources, US Army Corps of Engineers, Wake County Parks and Recreation, and a privately managed marina.

Events held at the park include monthly skywatching sessions offered by park rangers, the Morehead Planetarium and Science Center in nearby Chapel Hill, and volunteer amateur astronomers from the Chapel Hill Astronomical and Observing Society at the Ebenezer Church Recreation Area in the park.

== See also ==
- Jordan Lake
- Jordan Lake Educational State Forest
