= Sassafras Mountain =

Highest point in South Carolina, United States

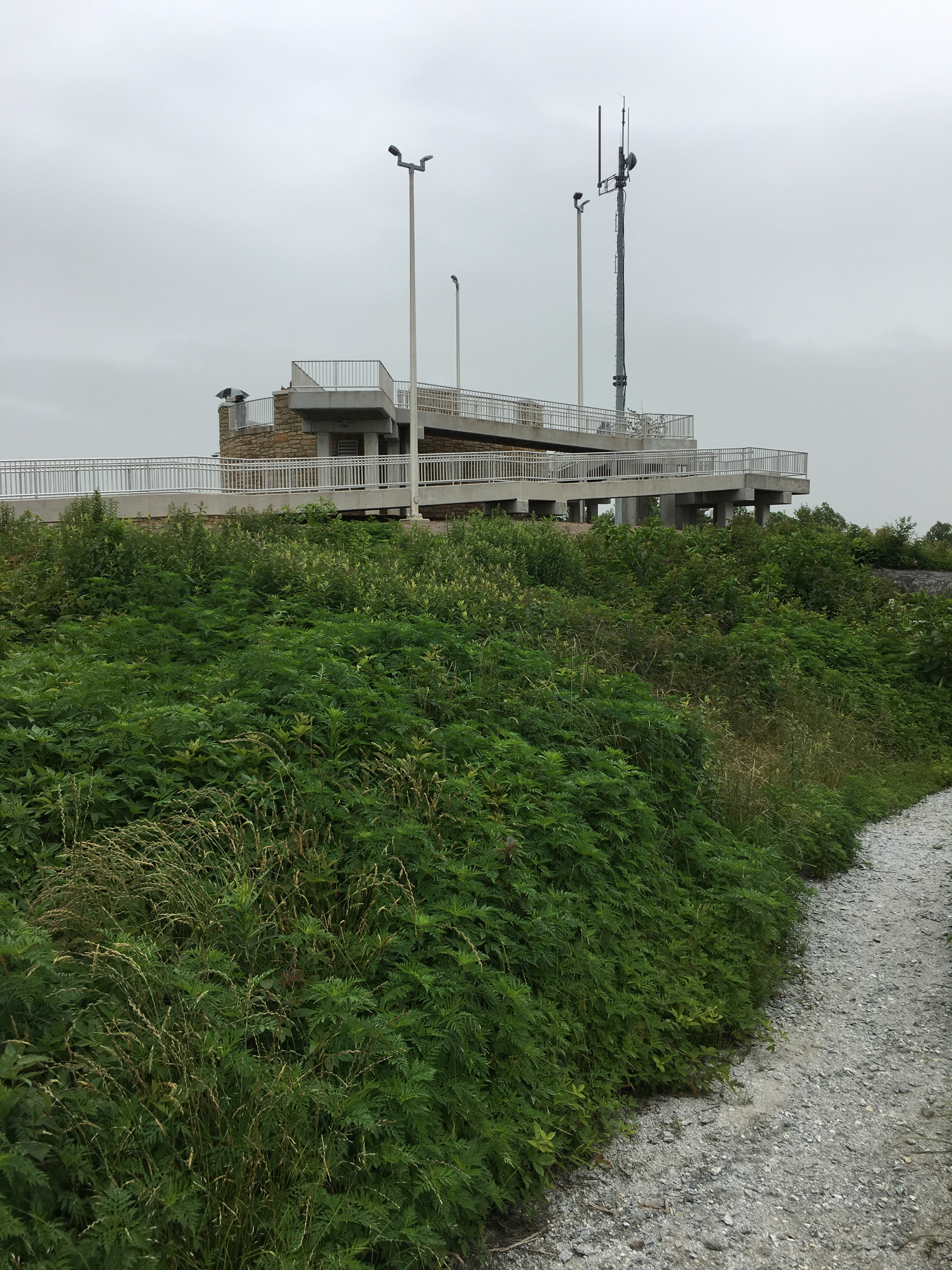
- Observation tower on the summit of Sassafras Mountain

Highest point
- Elevation: 3,554 ft (1,083 m)
- Listing: U.S. state high point 29th
- Coordinates: 35°03′53″N 82°46′38″W

Geography
- Location within South Carolina Location within the United States
- Location: Pickens County, South Carolina/Transylvania County, North Carolina, United States
- Parent range: Blue Ridge Mountains
- Topo map: USGS Eastatoe Gap

Sassafras Mountain is the highest point in the state of South Carolina, United States. It is in the Blue Ridge Mountains, part of the Appalachian Mountains. An observation tower opened on top of Sassafras Mountain in 2019.

== Location ==
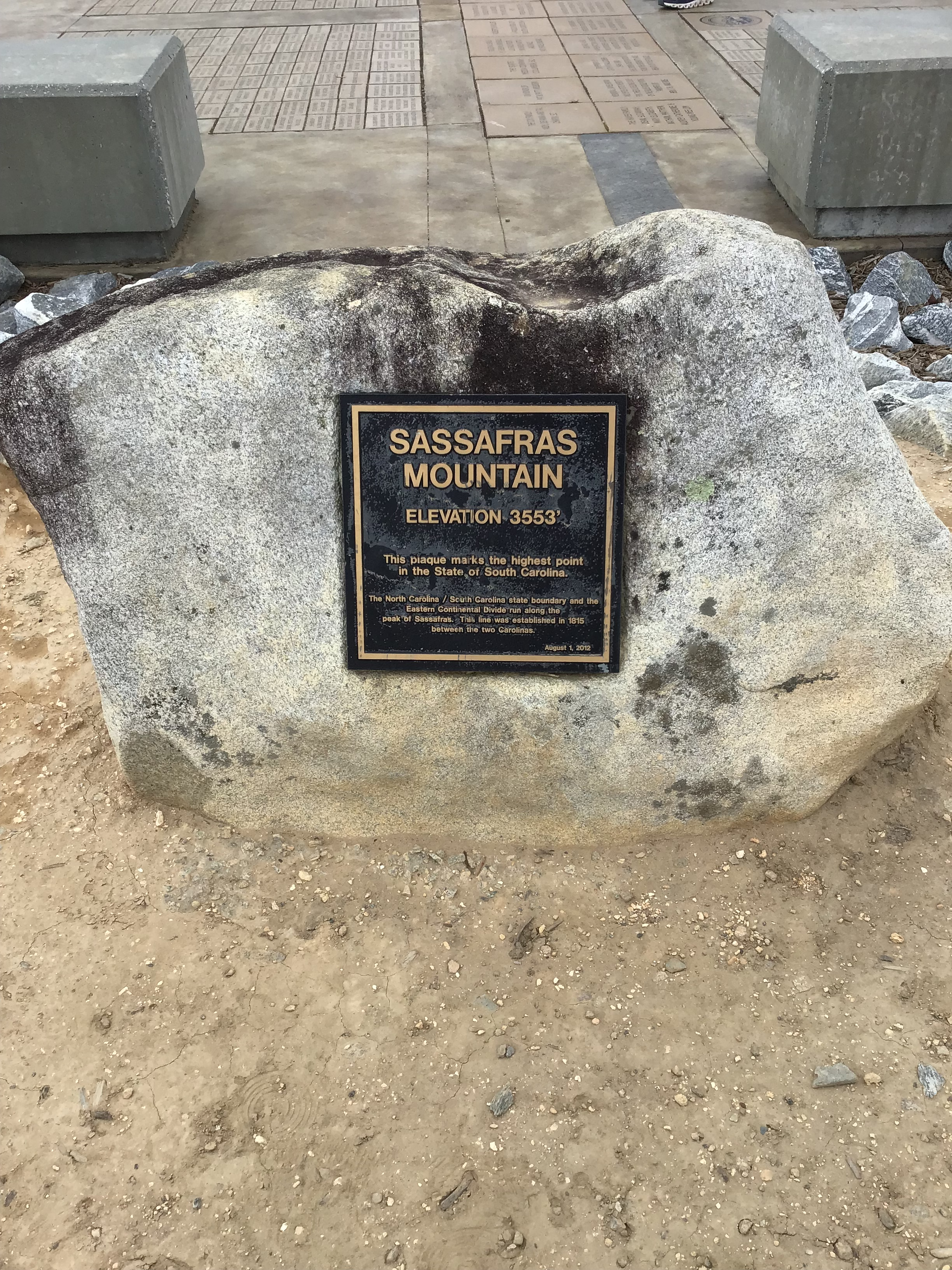
Plaque commemorating Sassafras Mountain

It is located along the South Carolina/North Carolina state line in northern Pickens County, South Carolina nearest to the town of Rosman, North Carolina. The summit is an easy 300 foot walk from the parking lot and is, by merit of not having stairs, wheelchair accessible, although the path is fairly steep.

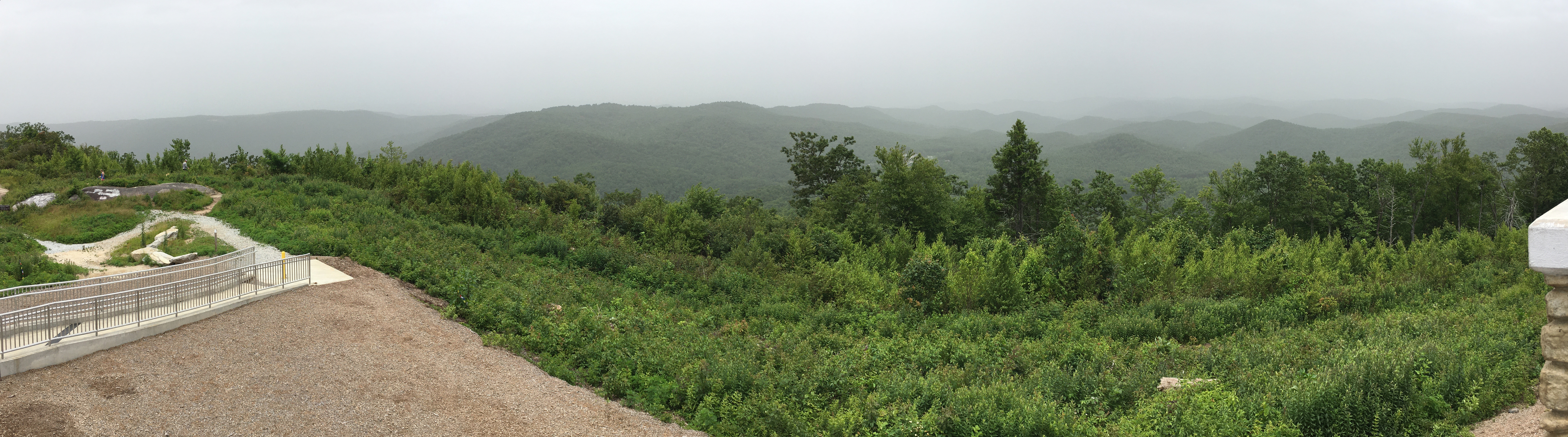
View from the observation tower

The North Carolina side of the mountain was owned by former Congressman Charles H. Taylor. In June 2010 he sold 8,000 acres (3,200 ha) to The Conservation Fund. The Fund has donated 4.8 acres (1.9 ha), at the top of the mountain, to the South Carolina Department of Natural Resources and conveyed a remaining 6,730 acres (2,720 ha) to the North Carolina Forest Service for Headwaters State Forest.

The Pisgah Quadrangle topographical map, revised 1904–1905, shows the long abandoned Sassafras Gap Road to be the preferred route through to Rosman, N.C. and Brevard, N.C. at the end of the 19th century and that the existing Highway 178 was then a secondary road. This abandoned road is a short distance from the summit and is crossed by the hiking trail to Caesars Head from Sassafras summit. Most people crossing this old roadbed in Sassafras Gap don't recognize it as a road, but it is easily recognized because of the short section of steps going down into the roadbed, and a similar section of short steps on the opposite side of the roadbed going up and the trail then continuing steeply up toward Caesars Head. A short hike South down the old Sassafras Gap Road will take you to Hickory Head Spring, the headwater of the South Saluda River. Hickory Head Spring is shown as a feature on the Mill's Atlas, 1825, Greenville District, South Carolina.

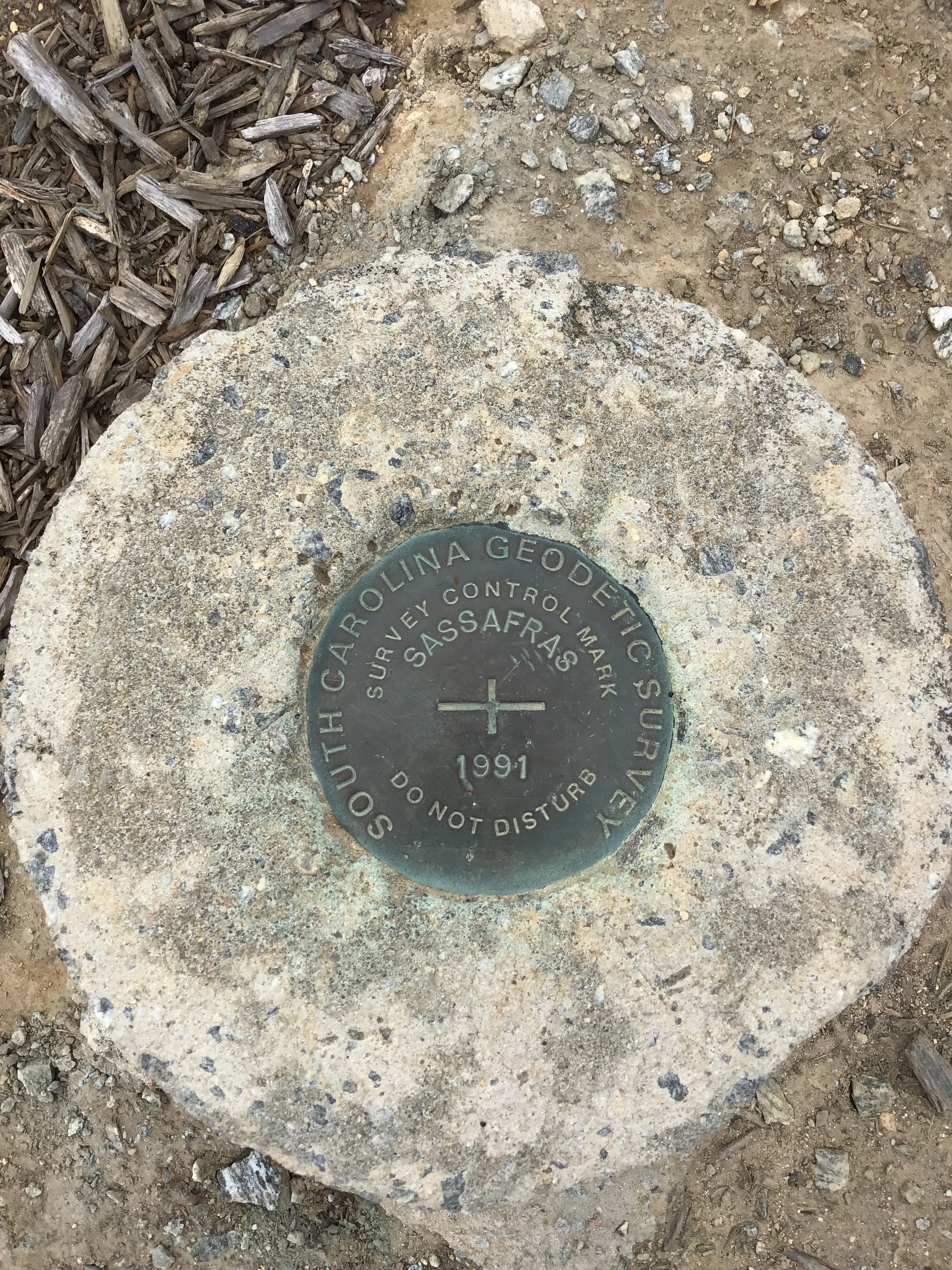
Sassafras Mountain survey marker

== Geology ==
The granite that originally formed Sassafras Mountain has metamorphosed into Henderson Gneiss, which is quartz, muscovite, and feldspar.

== See also ==
- Outline of South Carolina
- Index of South Carolina-related articles
- List of U.S. states by elevation
