= Pisgah View State Park =

State park in Buncombe and Haywood Counties, North Carolina

Pisgah View Mountain State Park
- Location within North Carolina Location within the United States
- Interactive map of Pisgah View Mountain State Park
- Location: Buncombe and Haywood counties, North Carolina, United States
- Coordinates: 35°28′7″N 82°46′8″W
- Area: 205 acres (83 ha)
- Elevation: 2,600 ft (790 m)
- Established: 2019
- Administrator: North Carolina Division of Parks and Recreation
- Website: Official website

Pisgah View State Park is a developing 205-acre (0.83 km^{2}) North Carolina state park in Buncombe and Haywood Counties, North Carolina, in the United States. The center piece of the park is the approximately 1,600-acre (6.5 km^{2}) Pisgah View Ranch, which has rental cabins, equestrian trails, a swimming pool, tennis courts and other amenities. The ranch has been privately owned by the Cogburn Family since the late 1700s, and the state acquired an option to purchase the property over a five-year period. The Southern Appalachian Highlands Conservancy has raised $1 million to aid with the purchase. The Cogburns will donate a portion of the land's value to the state.

== History ==
The North Carolina General Assembly authorized Pisgah View State Park on July 19, 2019. The first 205-acre (0.83 km^{2}) tract of the park was acquired in 2020.
