= North Carolina Forest Service =

Government agency of North Carolina

Agency overview
- Jurisdiction: State of North Carolina
- Parent department: North Carolina Department of Agriculture and Consumer Services
- Website: North Carolina Forest Service

The North Carolina Forest Service, formerly known as the North Carolina Division of Forest Resources, is a North Carolina state government agency responsible for providing land management assistance to landowners. The agency's primary responsibility is wildland fire control on all state and privately owned land in North Carolina, United States. The Service was a Division of the N.C. Department of Environment and Natural Resources until July 2011 and is now part of the North Carolina Department of Agriculture and Consumer Services.

== See also ==
- Government of North Carolina
