= Wetlands of North Carolina =

Wetlands in North Carolina cover over 5,000,000 acres (2,000,000 ha) of land, or about 17% of the state's area. Wetlands associated with palustrine, lacustrine, riverine, estuarine, and marine systems are all present in North Carolina and facilitate the conditions for numerous different wetland environments. About one-half of North Carolina's wetlands are bottomland hardwood forests, which are important for waterfowl breeding and fish spawning. Approximately 95% of all wetlands in North Carolina are located in the Coastal Plain of the state.

Wetlands are often waterlogged due to flooding. These unique hydrologic, geomorphic, and biologic conditions allow for wetlands to be incredibly productive ecosystems, playing major roles in the source, transport, and fate of various inorganic and organic materials. Wetlands have important roles in biogeochemical processes involving the carbon, nitrogen, oxygen, and sulfur cycles. They contribute to many critical ecosystem functions like water-quality protection, shoreline-erosion stabilization, storm protection, flood protection, and fish and wildlife habitat.

Wetlands used to cover over 10,000,000 acres (4,000,000 ha) of land in North Carolina, but have slowly been reduced to half due to anthropogenic activities such as agriculture, deforestation, and infrastructure. Conservation and restoration efforts have been made to try to prevent the continuous loss and degradation of these valuable ecosystems. Major anthropogenic impacts include draining/filling of salt marshes or wetlands, increased erosion, massive nutrient fluxes, and changing land use. Over the years, there have been significant wetland surface area losses, up to 50% by some estimates.

== Definitions and terminology ==
Wetlands are semi-aquatic ecosystems that serve as essential transitional zones between terrestrial and aquatic environments. The ecological definition specifies that wetlands have distinguishing characteristics based on three indicators: hydrology, soils, and vegetation. In the United States, the Clean Water Act legally defines wetlands as "those areas that are inundated or saturated by surface or groundwater at a frequency and duration sufficient to support, and that under normal circumstances do support, a prevalence of vegetation adapted for life in saturated soil conditions." The United States Fish and Wildlife Service National Wetlands Inventory classifies land as a wetland via three requirements: 1) the land primarily supports hydrophytic plants at least part of the year; 2) the soil is primarily hydric; and 3) the ground is saturated or covered by shallow water during at least part of the growing season annually.

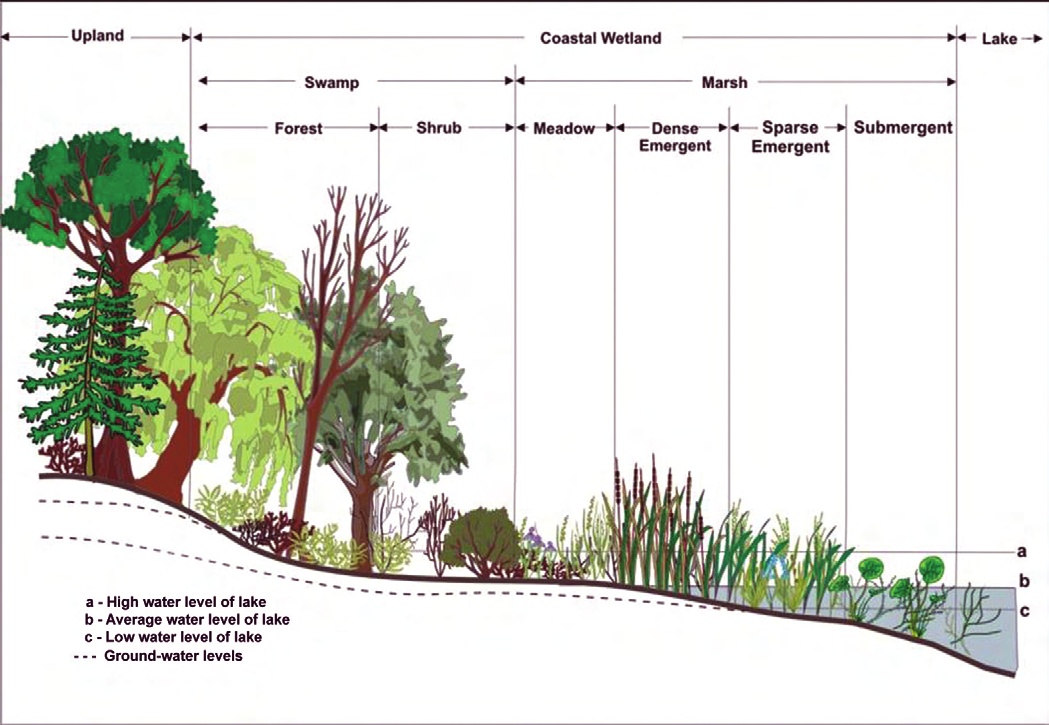
Profile of a typical coastal wetland

There are currently no wetlands in North Carolina that are designated as RAMSAR Wetlands of International Significance, but the Carolina Wetlands Association has submitted an application for Pocosin Lakes National Wildlife Refuge for this designation. North Carolina is a participant in the US Department of Agriculture Pilot Wetlands Reserve Program, which provides technical and financial assistance to private landowners and Tribes to restore, protect, and enhance wetlands in exchange for retiring eligible land from agricultural production.

Several federal and state policies have been put into place to protect wetlands in North Carolina and across the country, including Section 404 of the Clean Water Act, the Coastal Management Area Act (CAMA), and the North Carolina Wetland Program Plan. These aim to limit activities such as dredging, agricultural activity, and urban development from harming wetland ecosystems. Section 404 of the Clean Water Act aims to manage the dumping of discharge or "fill material" into watersheds. The Coastal Management Area Act allows for areas of environmental concern to be established and prevents development from destroying vulnerable coastal ecosystems. The North Carolina Wetland Program Plan compiles a list of goals to monitor and protect North Carolina's wetlands and distributes these objectives across different North Carolina Department of Environmental Quality divisions. Policies such as these aim to protect wetlands and maintain their physical, chemical, biological, and geological properties. North Carolina currently has programs and partnerships with the North Carolina Coastal Federation, such as the Large Scale Wetland Restoration project via the Natural Resource Conservation Service, Living with Water, Carolina Beach State Park Wetland Restoration, and Lumbee Wetland Restoration project to help rebuild and protect these valuable ecosystems.

== Types of Wetlands ==
There are approximately eleven major types of wetlands across the three physiographic regions of North Carolina (the Blue Ridge Mountains, the Piedmont, and the Coastal Plain). The different types of wetlands dominate in different areas due to variations in elevation, soil types, precipitation, and hydrologic sources, but most wetlands are found all across the state.

=== Wetlands in the Blue Ridge ===
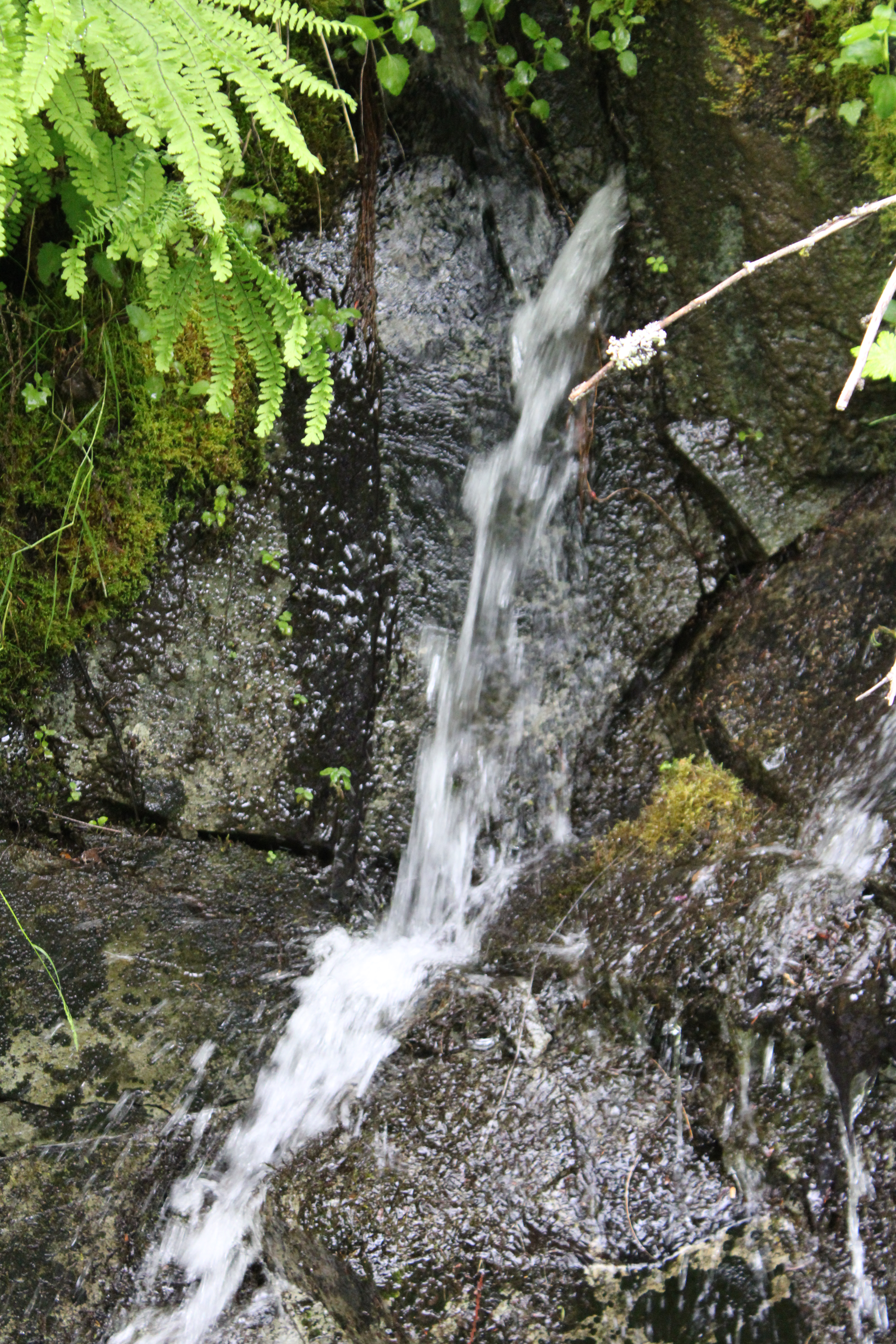
Seep with moving groundwater

The Blue Ridge Mountains are in western North Carolina, and they are dominated by mountain bogs, seeps, and headwater forest wetlands.

Mountain bogs are characterized by nutrient-poor, acidic, saturated soils and fed by groundwater near headwater streams. They are typically found in depressions or gentle slopes, mainly in Southern Appalachia. Sphagnum moss is one of the key species that occupies mountain bogs and plays a vital role in the acidity chemistry of the bog, as it regulates nutrient levels and pH. Mountain bogs also serve as a natural water purification system and work as flood control for the region. Conserving mountain bogs is a key step in recovering the bog turtle, the smallest turtle found in North America. Only 20% of North Carolina’s prehistoric bogs still exist in their unaltered condition because many have been filled for farming.

Seeps are characterized by the presence of slow-moving groundwater at the surface that cannot permeate the underlying ground and usually occupy small areas on sloping hill sides leading down to a floodplain. Seeps can be found all over North Carolina, therefore the vegetation can change between ecoregions. For instance, in western North Carolina; the Eller Seep is the state's only site for green pitcher plants. Seeps play a key role in water cycling, acting as a recharge for groundwater; they also lead to nutrient loading and flushing and are vital to nutrient cycling in the area.

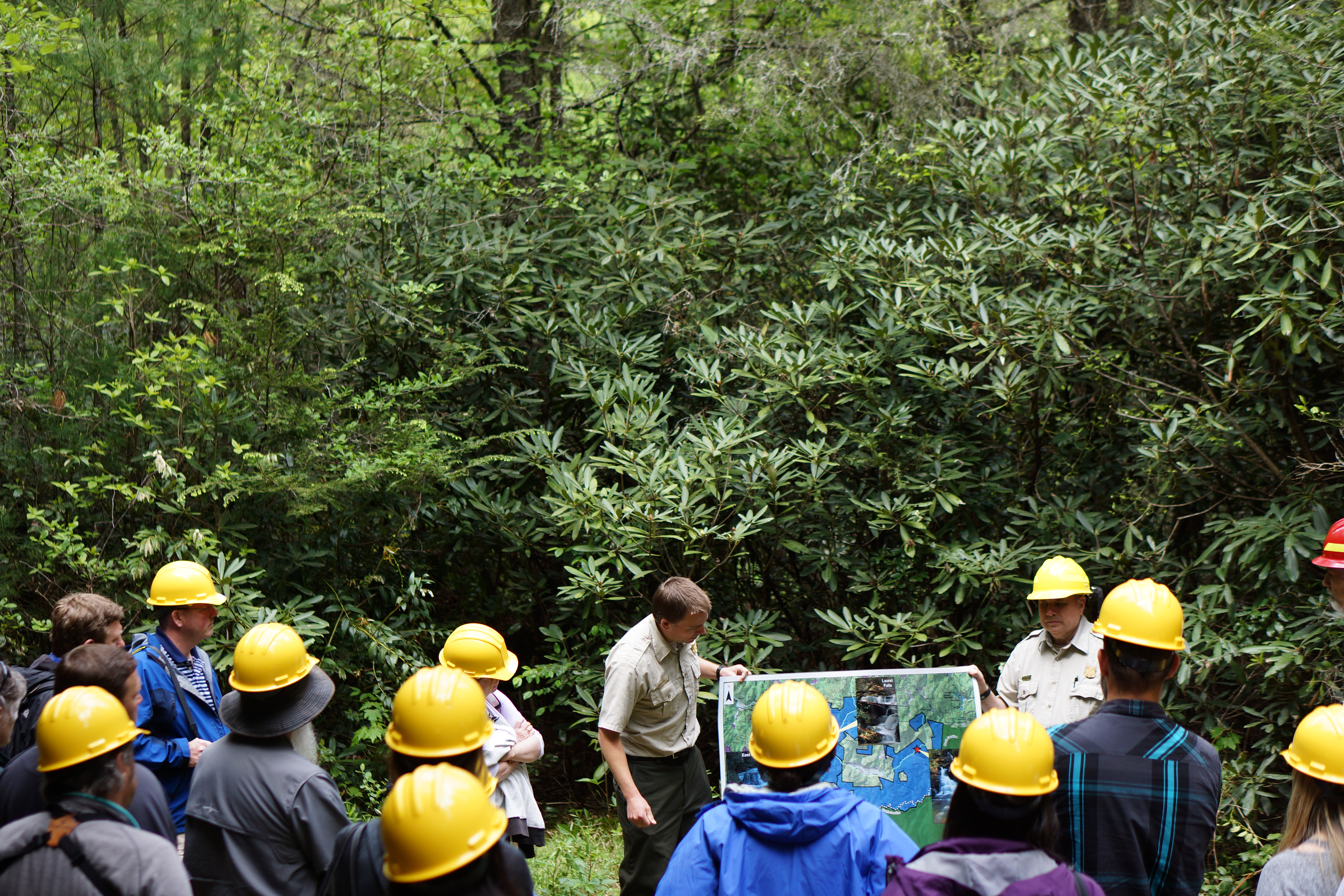
North Carolina forest staff in a headwater forest

Headwater forest wetlands are located at the highest points of a watershed and drain into small streams, acting as a natural drainage feature for the area and being vital to water quality and circulation as well as nutrient cycling. Headwater forest wetlands are usually fairly flat and hold water temporarily and provide habitats for various biodiversity, including salamanders. Fifty-nine percent of the state's palustrine wetlands are headwater wetlands, and these wetlands are found in all three physiographic regions of the state. Most organic matter is introduced to streams from terrestrial sources in headwater areas.

=== Wetlands in the Piedmont ===
The Piedmont, which is located between the Blue Ridge Mountains and the Coastal Plain, is dominated by headwater forests, seeps, riverine swamp forests, bottomland flat forests, and floodplain pool (ephemeral) wetlands.

Riverine swamp forests are mainly found along the wettest region of large river floodplains and can range in size from small strips of land to hundreds of acres. Swamps mainly receive water from flooding, but water may also be sourced from rain, runoff, and groundwater. Riverine swamps can drain mineral or organic soils and are vital to maintaining water quality in the region due to their filtration system. They also remove sediments, inorganic nutrients, and significant amounts of dissolved organic carbon from the water, maintaining the water quality. In the Piedmont, the vegetation is most often water-loving tree species such as Overcup Oak, Ashes, and American Elm.

Bottomland flat forests are typically found in the floodplains of other streams and generally flood for only part of the year. These flats have a wide range of biodiversity that depends on the size of the wetland and its location. However, these types of wetlands are typically dominated by broad-leaf deciduous trees such as swamp chestnut, laurel, willow, water oaks, tulip poplar, sweet gum, American elm, red maple, and black gum.

Floodplain pool wetlands are found in the floodplains of creeks and rivers, often at the base of the slope of oxbow lakes. They are generally small in size, flood for most of the year, and typically occur on mineral soils. Floodplain Pools are fed by rain, groundwater, and occasional flooding from a nearby river or stream. Trees commonly grow around the edge of the pool rather than inside the pool, where a variety of ferns, sedges, and other herbaceous plants can be found. Floodplain pools tend to dry out in the summer months and provide important breeding habitat for amphibians.

=== Wetlands in the Coastal Plain ===
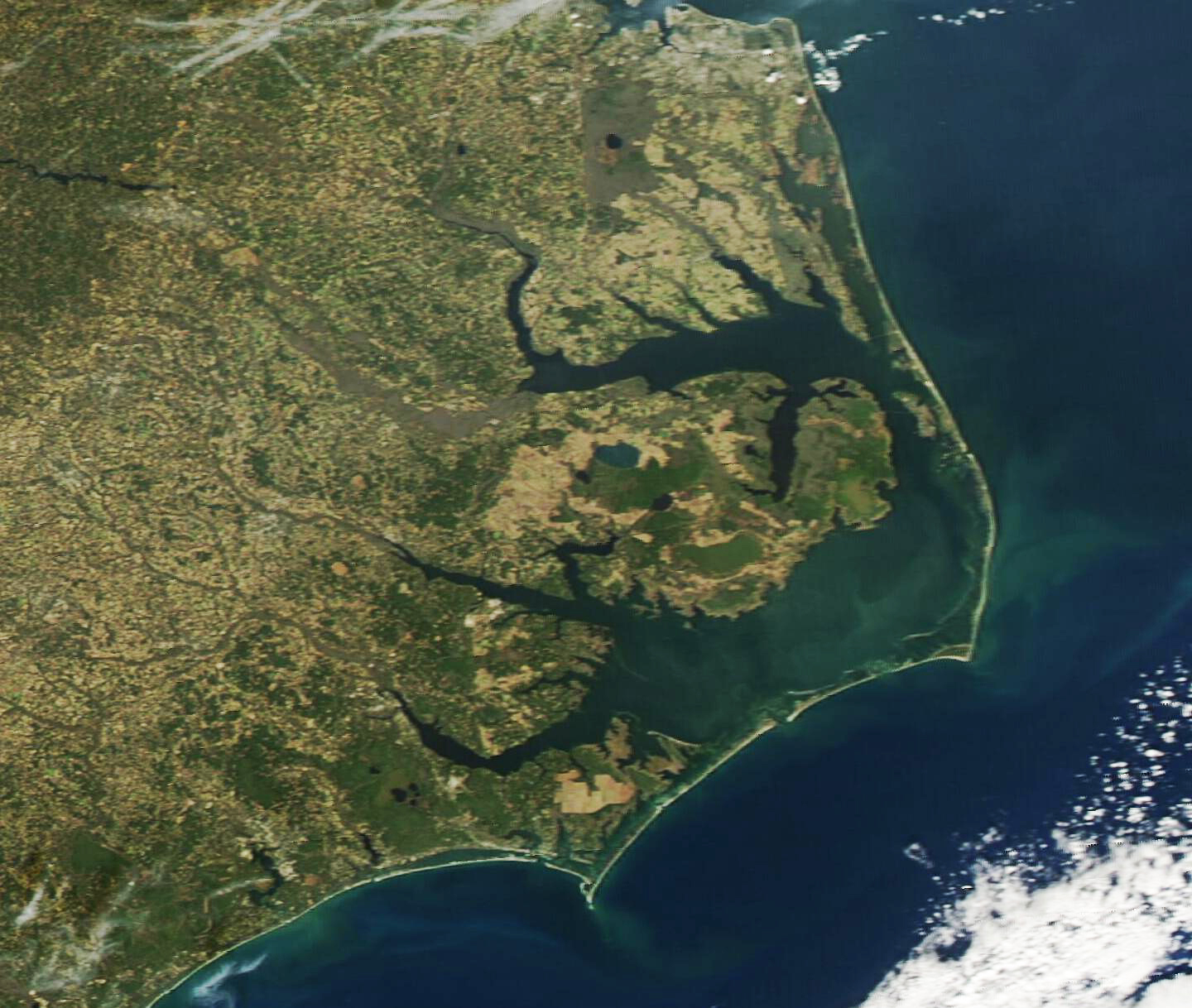
North Carolina's Coastal Plain

The Coastal Plain is the region with the most wetlands in North Carolina. The Coastal Plain drains from the Fall Line to the Intracoastal Atlantic Waterway and eventually the Atlantic Ocean. This physiographic region is dominated by riverine swamp forests, salt/brackish marshes, estuarine woods, tidal freshwater marshes, pocosins, pine savanna, pine flats, non-tidal freshwater marshes, and non-riverine swamp forests.

Salt and brackish marshes help absorb wave energy during storms and act as important nurseries for fish and shellfish. Salt marshes (salinity 0.5 to 30 parts per trillion) experience a higher degree of saltwater flooding from the ocean than brackish marshes (salinity greater than 30 parts per trillion), due to high tides twice a day. Salt marshes are a haven for species like salt cordgrass and oyster grass. Brackish marshes are not directly connected to the ocean, they have a wider range of plant species, dominated by black needle rush. The influx of freshwater to brackish marshes brings fine-grained silt, which accumulates on the ground surface known as "pluff mud".

Estuarine woods are found at the edges of estuaries or salt marshes, and their water levels are unpredictable because they are impacted by wind tides and are occasionally flooded with salt or brackish tide water, often during storm surges. They have >50% woody vegetation like trees and large shrubs, which are adaptable to water level changes and chemical variation due to saltwater influence, like the loblolly pine, red maple, sweet gum, cedars, wax myrtle, saltbush, and marsh elder.

Tidal freshwater marshes are only found in the Coastal Plain in areas that experience flooding during lunar and wind tides, as well as during strong storms. These marshes usually have salinity levels < 0.5 parts per trillion and support large amounts of diversity of herbaceous plants and some woody plants. These types of marshes are particularly vulnerable to sea level rise.

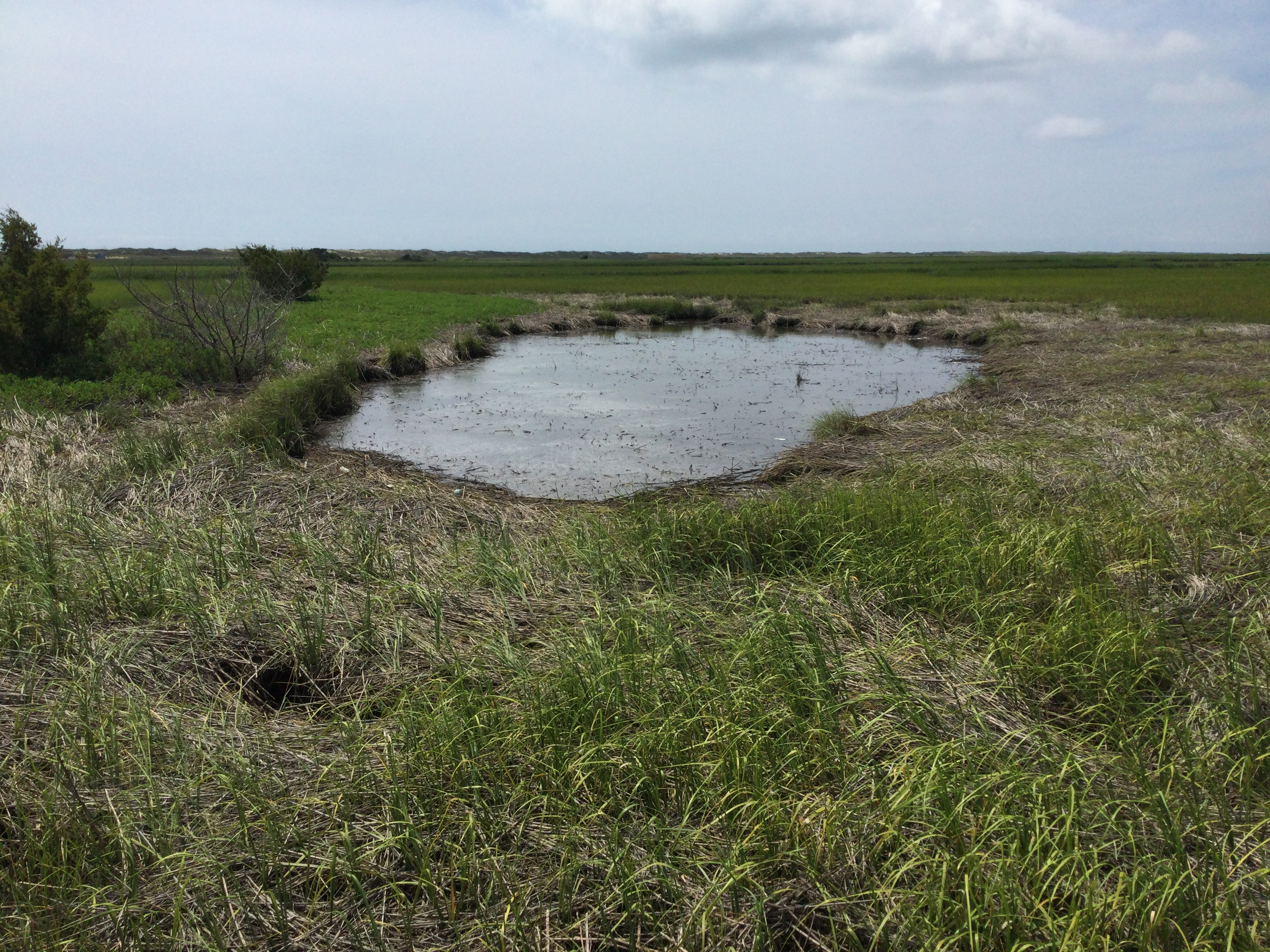
Salt marsh at Fort Fisher, North Carolina

Pocosins are unique wetlands that develop in areas where ancient river valleys were filled with sand, silt, and clay from eroding Appalachian Mountains and have thousands of years of deep, built-up layers of peat. The name “pocosin” is an Eastern Algonquin word for “swamp-on-a-hill”. Because of their landscape position, they do not have any natural water inflow from streams but instead have streams flowing out They are characterized by acidic water, low nutrient availability, and are only replenished by precipitation or groundwater input. Very few types of trees can live in a true pocosin, such as evergreen shrubs and the gnarly pond pine. Pocosins once covered much of the eastern third of North Carolina, but many of them have been converted to agricultural land by removing water through ditching, which is when standing water is drained and the water table is lowered.

Pine Wetlands are found scattered throughout the Coastal Plain and include Wet Pine Flatwoods, Pine Savanna, and Sandhill Seep. These ecosystems naturally experience frequent, low to moderate intensity surface fires, which strongly impact the vegetation type. In the absence of fire, herb density and diversity decreases because shrubs present in the adjacent habitat or understory may invade and may become the dominant species. Water table levels in these wetlands stay close enough to the surface of the ground. Pine savannas are dominated by longleaf pine over grass and herbaceous plants, including pond pine trees, bays, fetterbush, gallberry, wax myrtle, sedges, orchids, and lilies. Longleaf pines have been extensively logged in North Carolina. Pine wetlands are home to the North Carolina Venus flytrap. Additionally, pine savannas provide habitat for the endangered red-cockaded woodpecker.

Non-tidal freshwater marshes are found in the floodplains of rivers and streams and along the edges of large lakes. They can vary in size depending on their landscape location and are typically flooded with freshwater for most of the year. Notably, non-tidal freshwater marshes may develop in areas of anthropogenic disturbances, such as urbanization, landscape modification, or agricultural activity.

Non-riverine swamp forests primarily occur on poorly drained flatlands free of streams, rivers, or estuaries, fed mostly by groundwater discharge, overland runoff, and precipitation. They have generally flat topography and are characterized by hummocky ground that makes for good water storage, mucky mineral or organic soils. Their forests house various tree species, including the bald cypress, black gum, and Atlantic white cedar.

== Biogeochemical Cycling ==
=== Carbon ===
Wetlands and salt marshes are a significant carbon reservoir in North Carolina biogeochemistry. Carbon sequestered in these environments is often referred to as blue carbon. Due to the significant amount of primary production that is then buried in oxygen-poor (suboxic) or oxygen-depleted (anoxic) saturated soils, these ecosystems are prominent sites of carbon burial. Plants like Spartina alterniflora and Spartina patens are especially important for blue carbon. The sediment trapped in the vegetation of wetlands also sequesters carbon by trapping organic matter. Perturbations to these ecosystems may cause buried organic carbon to be oxidized and released as carbon dioxide into surrounding coastal waters.

Major pathways of carbon cycling include photosynthesis, respiration, fermentation, methanogenesis, and methane oxidation (aerobic and anaerobic). In freshwater wetlands, the major portion of carbon fixed by autotrophs is removed via methanogenesis.

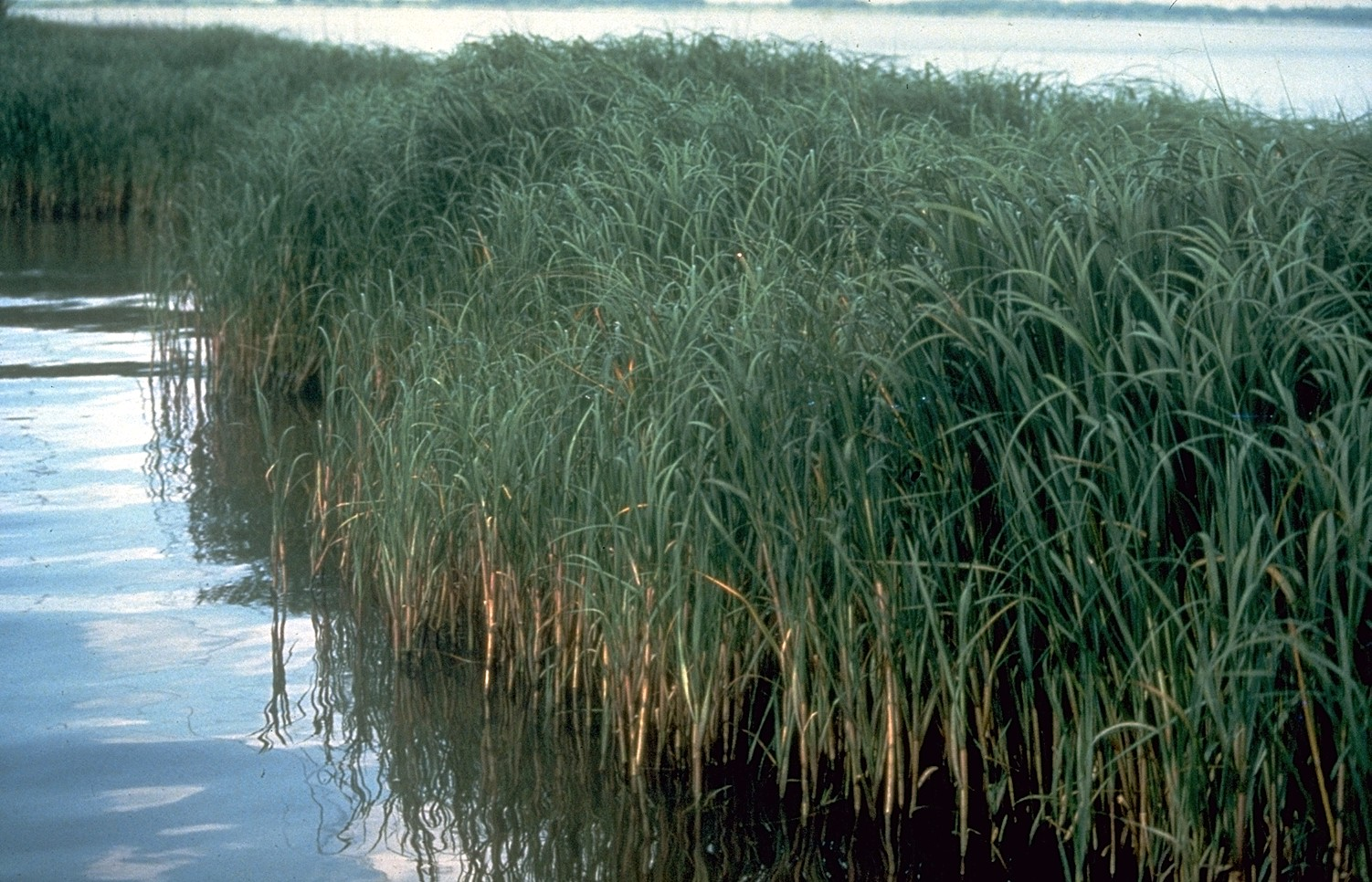
Spartina atlernifora, a species of grass that is common in North Carolina wetlands. It is key to sustaining many biogeochemical processes in wetlands.

=== Nitrogen ===
The primary form of mineralized nitrogen in most flooded wetland soils is NH_{4}^{+}. Up to 90% of nitrogen that enters wetlands is removed by denitrification in North Carolina wetlands. However, N_{2}O is often emitted from wetlands due to the partial inefficiency of nitrification and denitrification.

Nitrogen abundance in wetlands in North Carolina has been increasing in recent years due to anthropogenic activity. Activities such as fossil fuel combustion and fertilizer production release N compounds to the atmosphere for use in biogeochemical cycles and processes. If wetlands are located near an agricultural area, they evolve to become heavily relied upon for the recycling of nitrogen. The main form of nitrogen present from agriculture is NO_{3}^{-}. Eutrophication and hypoxia are two consequences of excess inorganic nitrogen observed in inland and coastal waters in North Carolina.

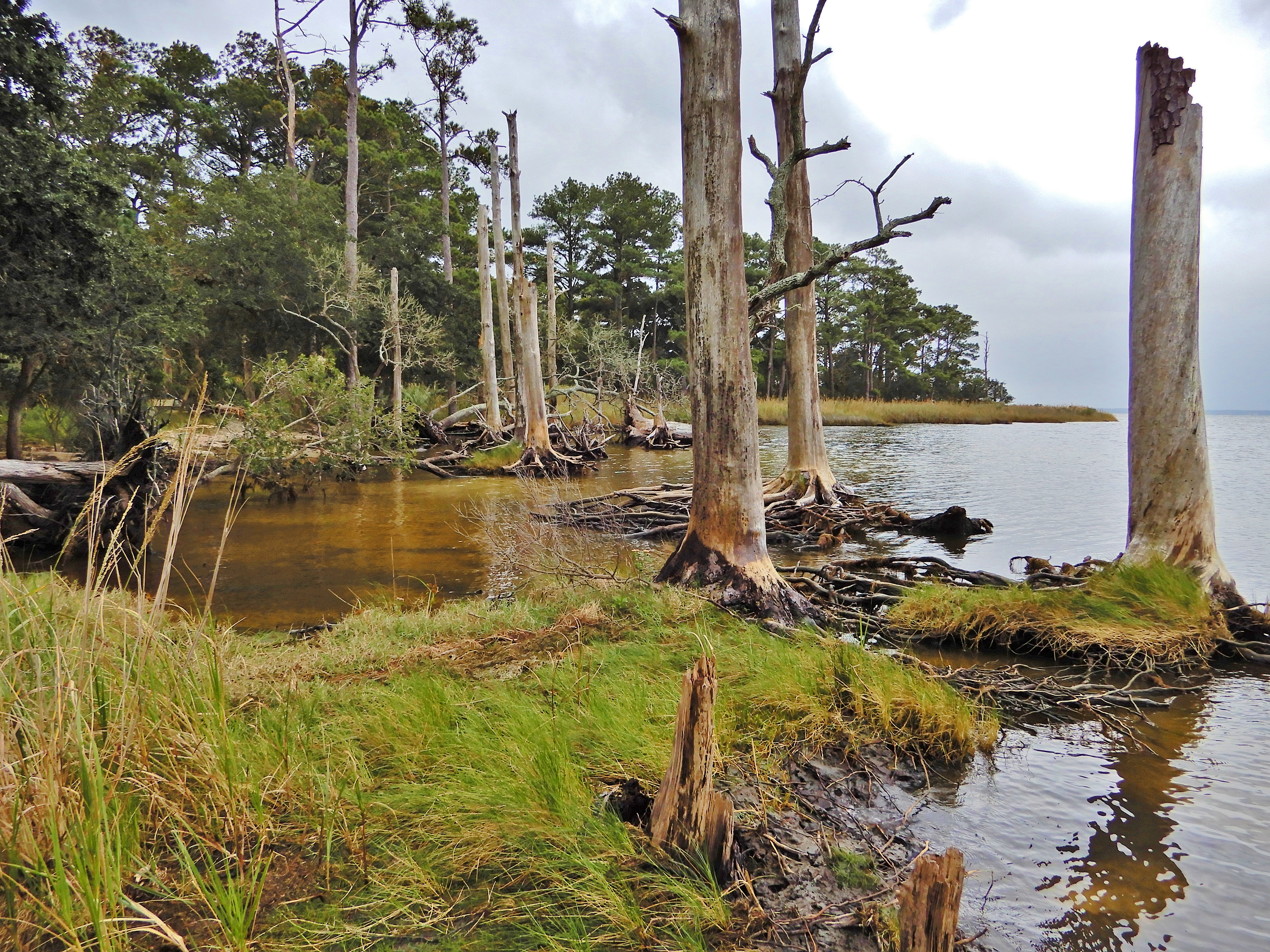
Ghost forest section of wetlands; the bald cypress trees are dead due to saltwater intrusion from anthropogenic activity.

Major pathways of nitrogen cycling include nitrogen fixation, nitrogen mineralization (ammonification), volatilization, nitrification, denitrification, dissimilatory nitrate reduction to ammonia (DNRA), and anammox (anaerobic ammonium oxidation).

=== Phosphorus ===
Phosphorus is a major limiting nutrient in bogs, freshwater marshes, and deepwater swamps, including those in North Carolina. The predominant form depends on the pH, and phosphorus may adsorb onto clay complexes.

=== Sulfur ===
Sulfate reduction with the substate produced from fermentation is often the dominant form of organic carbon degradation in salt marshes because sulfate impedes methanogenesis. Hydrogen sulfide produced from sulfate reduction is often released when wetland sediments are disrupted. Sulfide oxidation may also occur in North Carolina wetlands, in addition to assimilatory sulfate reduction.
