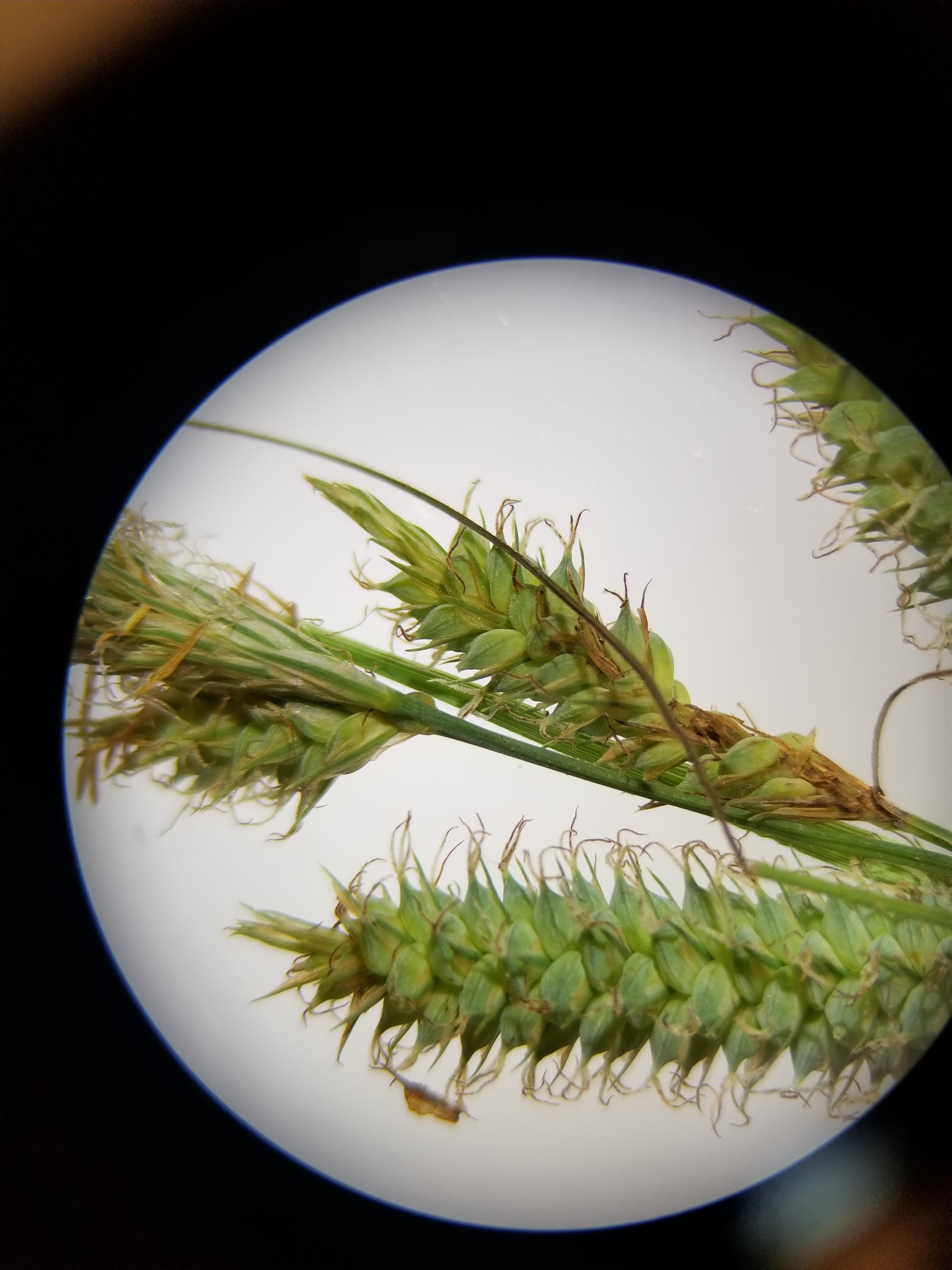

Scientific classification
- Kingdom: Plantae
- Clade: Tracheophytes
- Clade: Angiosperms
- Clade: Monocots
- Clade: Commelinids
- Order: Poales
- Family: Cyperaceae
- Genus: Carex
- Species: C. glaucescens

Binomial name
- Carex glaucescens Elliott

= Carex glaucescens =

Species of grass-like plant

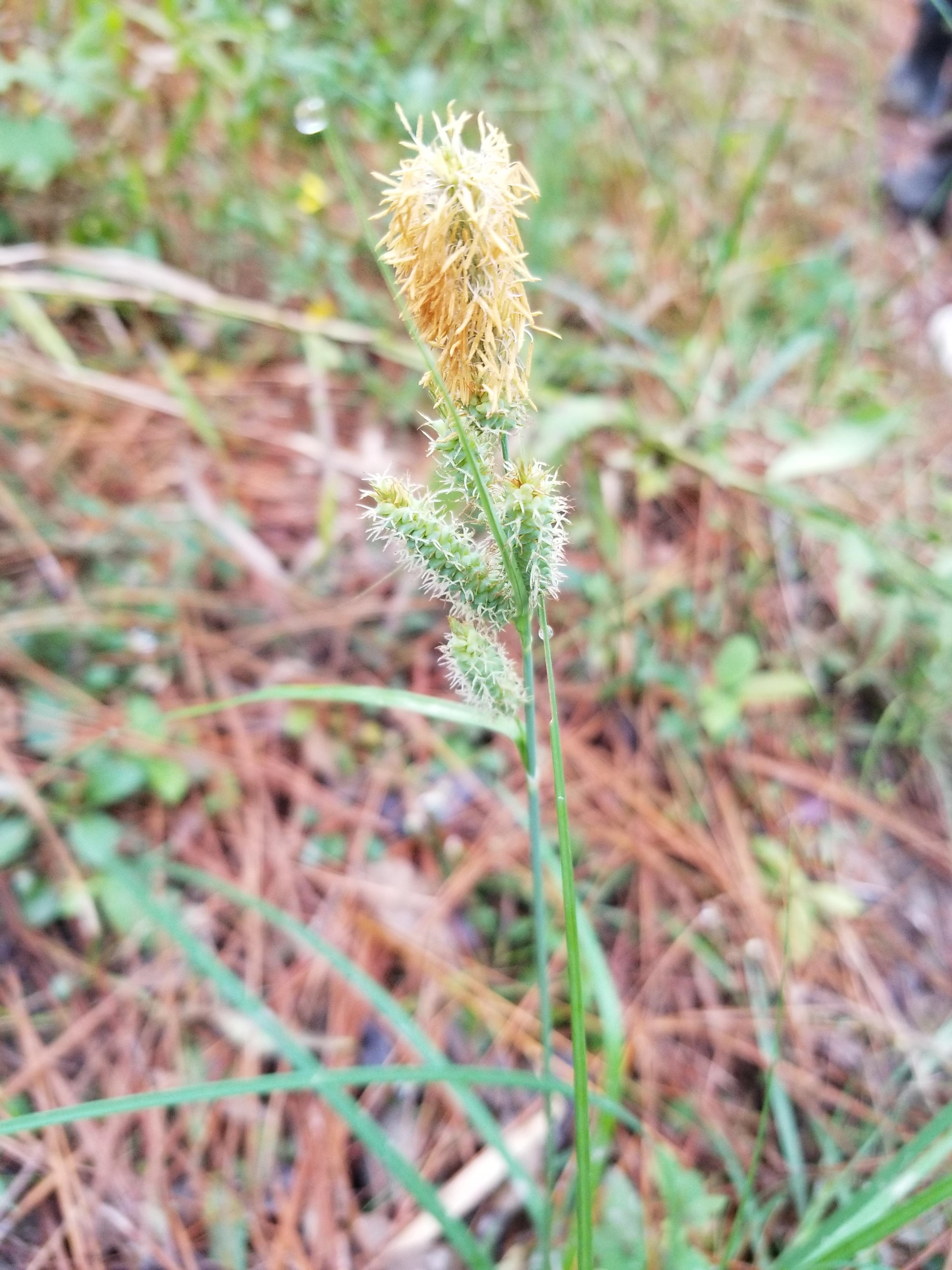
Carex glaucescens in its natural habitat

Carex glaucescens is a perennial sedge that belongs to the family Cyperaceae. The common name of this sedge is the southern waxy sedge due to the blue-grey, waxy appearance of the sheaths and fruits. The term "glaucous" means "gleaming" or "grey" in Latin; the specific epithet of C. glaucescens is derived from this term. Carex glaucescens is a native plant in North America and is an obligate wetland species in the Atlantic and Gulf Coastal Plains, Eastern Mountains and Piedmont, and the Great Plains.

== Description ==
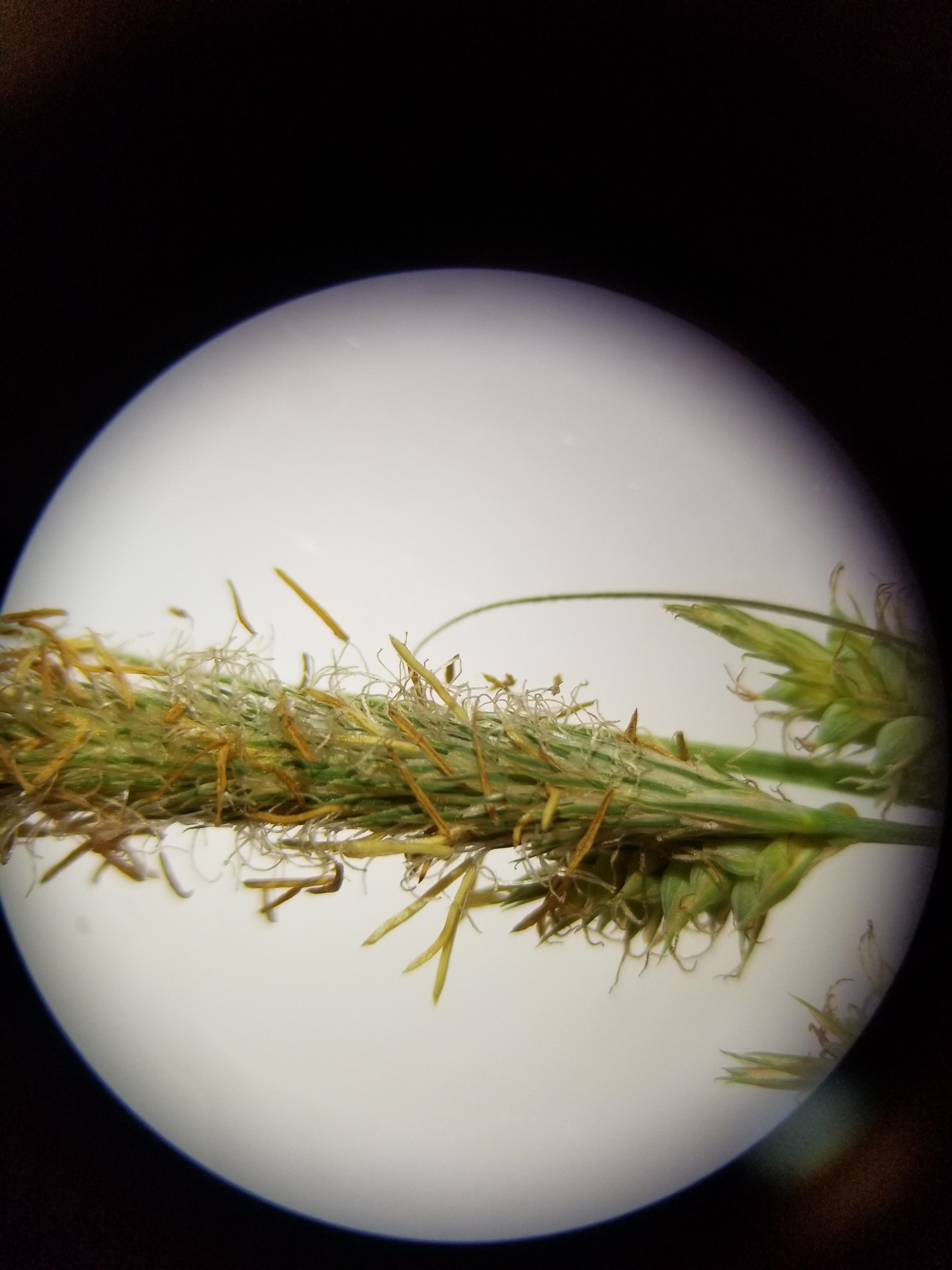
Staminate spikelet which fertilizes the pistillate spikelet

Carex glaucescens is a graminoid, meaning they have a grass-like appearance. This species begins blooming in the early summer months, and begins developing fruits into the late summer months around July and August. Carex glaucescens features a staminate spikelet at the top of the plant which fertilizes the pistillate spikelets below it. The fruits are born on pendulous pistillate spikelets which are covered by translucent papilla, which gives the fruit sac its glaucous appearance. Inside the fruit sac are ellipsoid achenes, the seed of the plant.

== Habitat ==
C. glaucescens may be found in acidic or peaty habitats, such as depression ponds, wet pine savannas, seepage bogs, and pocosins. It often acts as an indicator species in wetland environments.
