= Cedar Island National Wildlife Refuge =

National Wildlife Refuge in North Carolina, United States

- IUCN category IV (habitat/species management area)
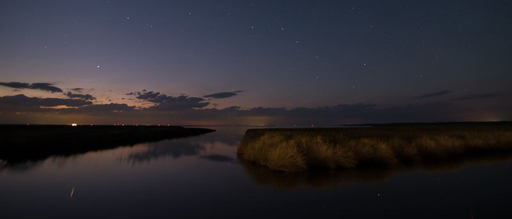

- Location within the United States Location within North Carolina
- Location: Carteret County, North Carolina, United States
- Nearest city: Beaufort, North Carolina
- Coordinates: 34°57′N 76°20′W
- Area: 14,480 acres (58.6 km^{2})
- Established: 1964
- Governing body: U.S. Fish and Wildlife Service
- Website: Cedar Island National Wildlife Refuge

Cedar Island National Wildlife Refuge, located in Carteret County, North Carolina, is on the end of a peninsula marking the southern end of Pamlico Sound. The refuge lies five miles (8 km) east of the Atlantic Ocean and about 40 miles (64 km) northeast of Beaufort, North Carolina. Established in 1964, the refuge consists of approximately 11,000 acres (45 km^{2}) of irregularly flooded, brackish marsh and 3,480 acres (14.1 km^{2}) of pocosin and woodland habitat. The dominant marsh plants include black needlerush, saltmarsh cordgrass, saltmeadow hay, and saltgrass. The woodland areas are dominated by loblolly, longleaf and pond pine. Live oak is also abundant on some upland sites. The marsh and surrounding waters provide wintering habitat for thousands of ducks and nesting habitat for colonial waterbirds.

Mammalian species that inhabit this refuge are gray squirrel, marsh rabbit, white-tailed deer, red fox, raccoon, bobcat, gray fox, nutria, beaver, muskrat, river otter, mink and opossum.
