= Black needlerush =

Black Needlerush is a common name for several rushes in the genus Juncus and may refer to:

- Juncus gerardii, native to northern North America and Europe
- Juncus roemerianus, native to the southeastern United States and the Caribbean
