= Pocosin =

Kind of wetland of the Atlantic plain

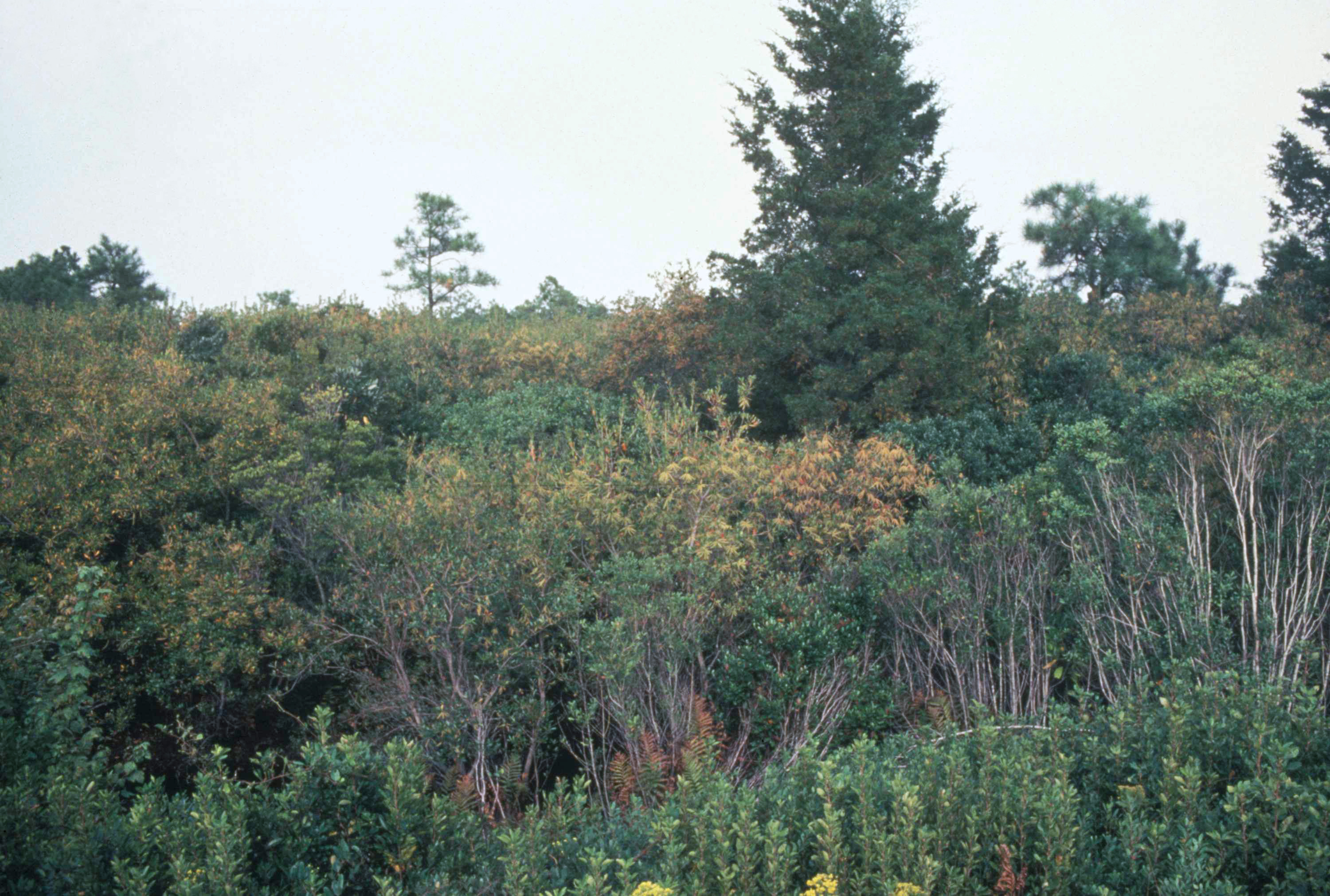
Pocosin wetland in North Carolina

Pocosin is a type of palustrine wetland with deep, acidic, sandy, peat soils. Groundwater saturates the soil except during brief seasonal dry spells and during prolonged droughts. Pocosin soils are nutrient-deficient (oligotrophic), especially in phosphorus.

Pocosins occur in the southern portions of the Atlantic coastal plain of North America, spanning from southeastern Virginia, through North Carolina, and into South Carolina. The majority of pocosins are found in North Carolina. The Alligator River National Wildlife Refuge was created in 1984 to help preserve pocosin wetlands. The nearby Cedar Island National Wildlife Refuge also protects pocosin habitat.

== Characteristics ==
Pocosins occupy poorly drained higher ground between streams and floodplains. Seeps cause the inundation. There are often perched water tables underlying pocosins.

Shrub vegetation is common in a pocosin ecosystem. Pocosins are sometimes called shrub bogs. Pond pines (Pinus serotina) dominate pocosin forests, but loblolly pine (Pinus taeda) and longleaf pine (Pinus palustris) are also associated with pocosins. Additionally, pocosins are home to rare and threatened plant species including Venus flytrap (Dionaea muscipula) and sweet pitcher plant (Sarracenia rubra).

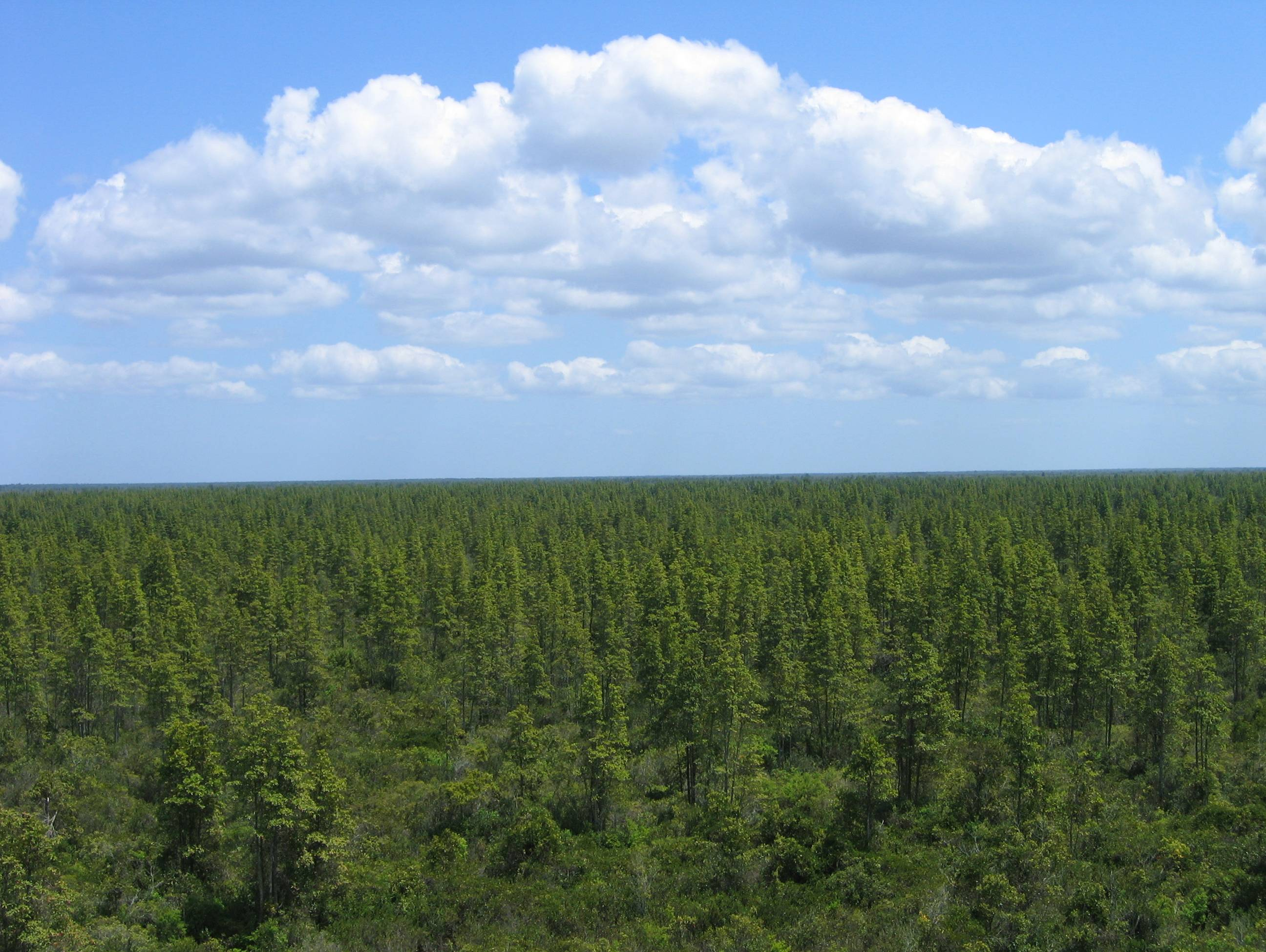
Pocosin forested by pond pines and white cedars

A distinction is sometimes made between short pocosins, which have shorter trees (less than 20 feet (6.1 m)), deeper peat, and fewer soil nutrients, and tall pocosins, which have taller trees (greater than 20 feet (6.1 m)), shallow peat, and more nutrient-rich soil. Where soil saturation is less frequent and peat depths shallower, pocosins transition into pine flatwoods. A loose definition of "pocosin" can include all shrub and forest bogs, as well as stands of Atlantic white cedar (Chamaecyparis thyoides) and loblolly pine on the Atlantic coastal plain.

Pocosins are formed by the accumulation of organic matter, resembling black muck, that is built up over thousands of years. This accumulation of material causes the area to be highly acidic and nutrient-deficient. The thickness of the organic buildup varies depending on one's location within the pocosin. Near the edges the buildup can be several inches thick but toward the center it can be up to several feet thick. Vegetation on the pocosin varies throughout. At the edges more pond pine is found with an abundance of titi, zenobia (a shrub unique to pocosins), and greenbrier vines. Closer to the center, thin stunted trees are typically found and fewer shrubs and vines are present.

Pocosins are important to migratory birds due to the abundance of various types of berries.

Pocosin ecosystems are fire-adapted (pyrophytic). Pond pines exhibit serotiny, such that wildfire can create a pond pine seedbed in the soil. Wildfires in pocosins tend to be intense, sometimes burning deep into the peat, resulting in small lakes and ponds.

Wildfires occurring about once a decade tend to cause pond pines to dominate over other trees, and cane (Arundinaria) rather than shrubs to dominate the understory. More frequent fires result in a pyrophytic shrub understory. Annual fires prevent shrub growth and thin the pond pine forest cover, creating a flooded savanna with grass, sedge, and herb groundcover.

== Etymology ==
The word pocosin has Eastern Algonquian roots. Sources have long attested that the term translates into English as "swamp-on-a-hill," but evidence for this precise translation is lacking. The city of Poquoson, Virginia, located in the coastal plain of Virginia (see Tidewater region of Virginia) derives its name from this geographic feature.
