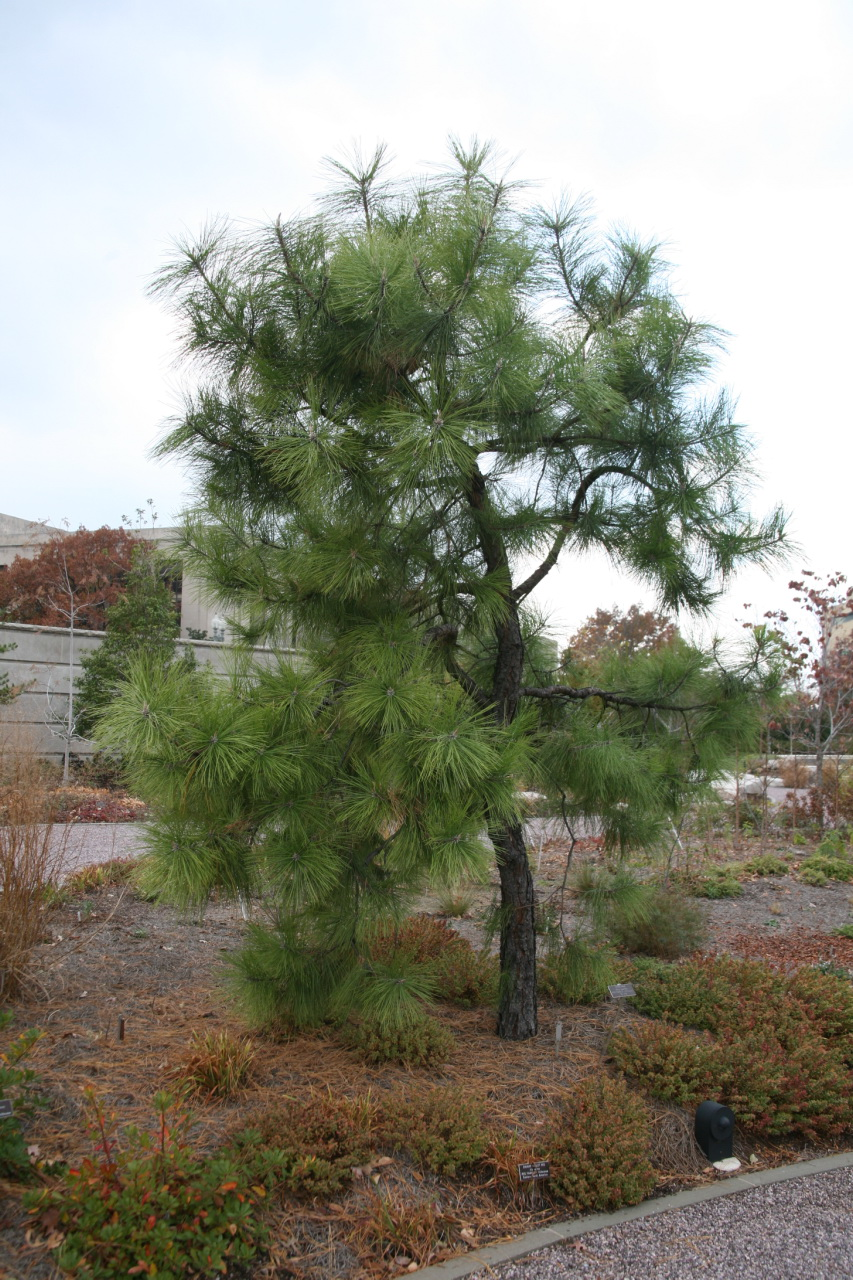

Conservation status
- Least Concern (IUCN 3.1)

Scientific classification
- Kingdom: Plantae
- Clade: Tracheophytes
- Clade: Gymnosperms
- Division: Pinophyta
- Class: Pinopsida
- Order: Pinales
- Family: Pinaceae
- Genus: Pinus
- Subgenus: P. subg. Pinus
- Section: P. sect. Trifoliae
- Subsection: P. subsect. Australes
- Species: P. serotina

Binomial name
- Pinus serotina Michx.
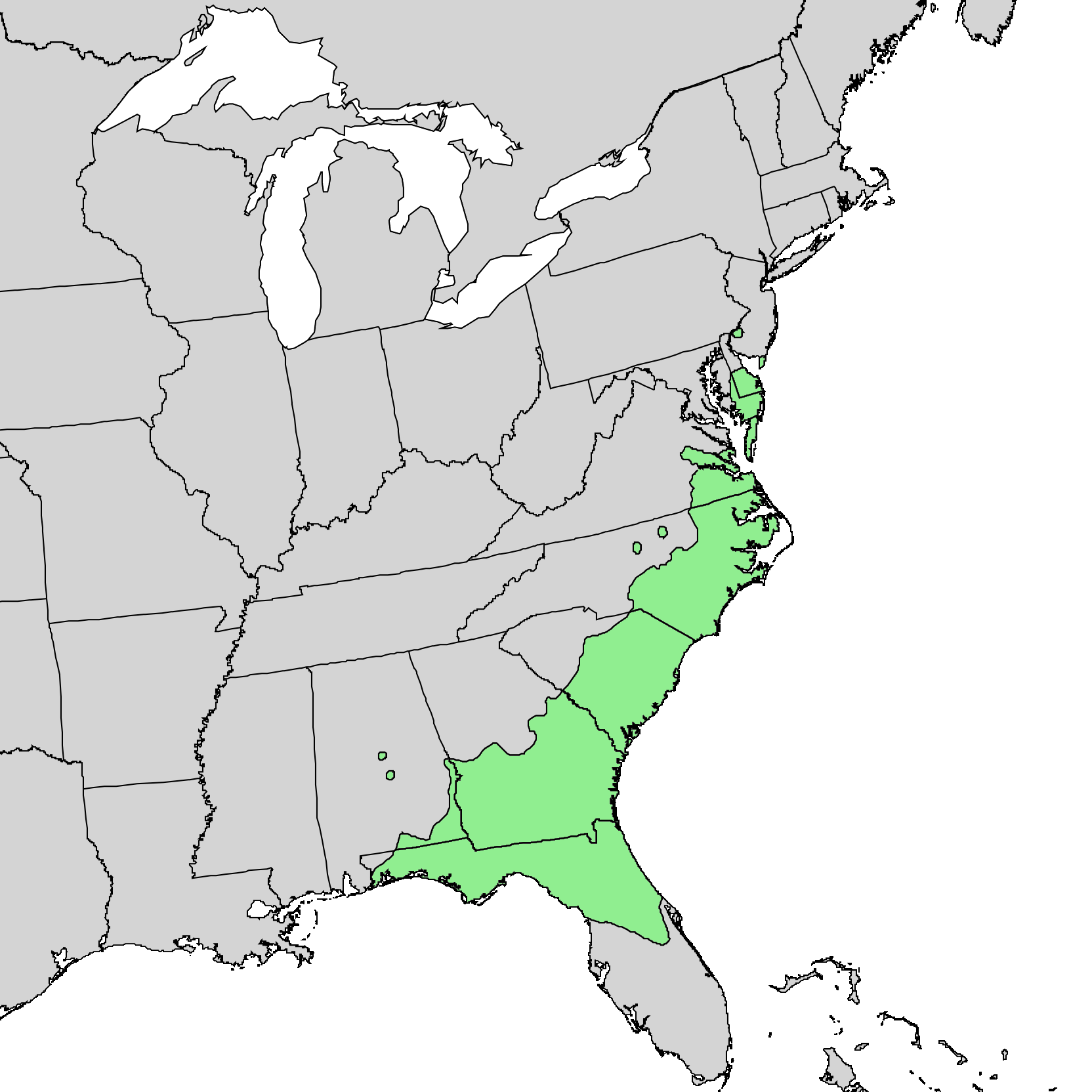
- Natural range

= Pinus serotina =

Pond pine

Species of conifer

Pinus serotina, the pond pine, black bark pine, bay pine, marsh pine, or pocosin pine, is a species of pine found in the southeastern United States.

== Description ==
This pine often has a crooked growth pattern and an irregular top and grows up to 21 metres (69 feet) high, rarely to 29 m (95 ft). The needles are in bundles of three or four, and 15–20 centimetres (6–8 inches) long. Pinus serotina will grow needles and little branches directly from the trunk. The bark of the pond pine forms rough plates. They are a brownish-red color. The pond pines are not as cold hardy as the loblolly and pitch pines. It takes 18 years for the pond pine to reach full maturity.

The almost round cones are 5–8 cm (2–3 1/4 in) long with small prickles on the scales. Its cones are usually serotinous, requiring fire to open. The pollen cones are cylinder-shaped with a yellow, brownish color, and are up to 1.8 inches long. Seed cones need two years to mature after pollination. In some cases, they will drop their seeds, but in most P. serotina, they will persist and hold their seeds. The color of the seed cones and seed scales is red-brown in color. The foliar sheaths measure 1–2 cm (1/2–3/4 in) with long bases. The seeds are ovule in shape, being between 0.5 and 0.6 cm (1/4 and 1/4 in) in length, and have an angled tip colored a pale brown. For seeds to be used for regeneration, seed trees that are 23–25 cm (9–10 in) in diameter at breast height and 30 years old are expected to produce 5,000 seeds.

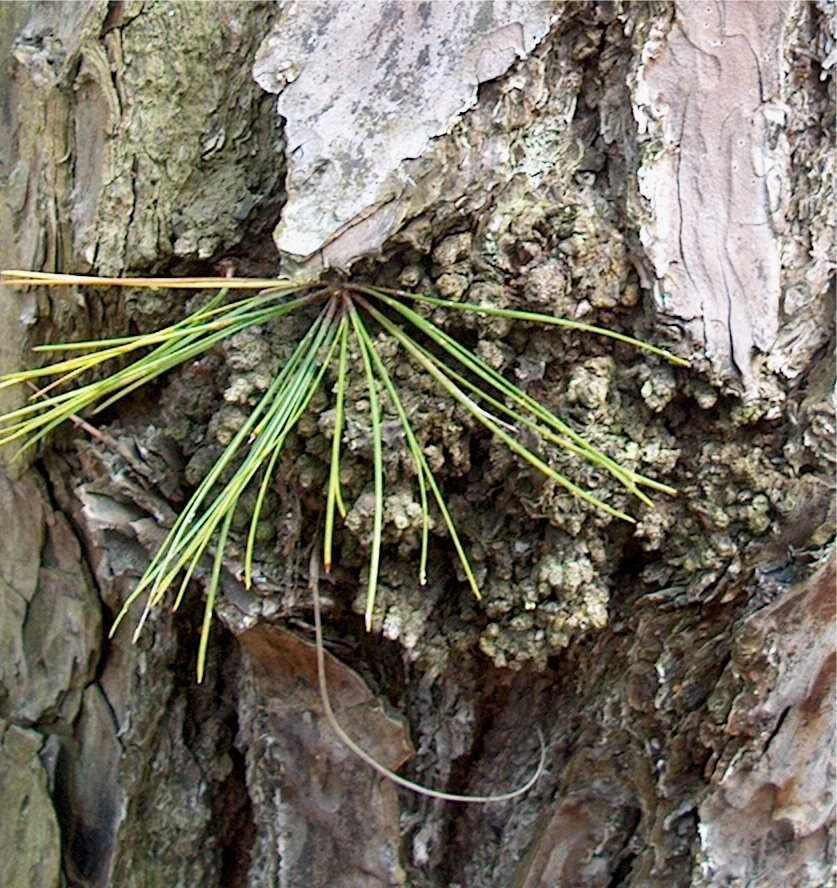
Needles growing from the trunk

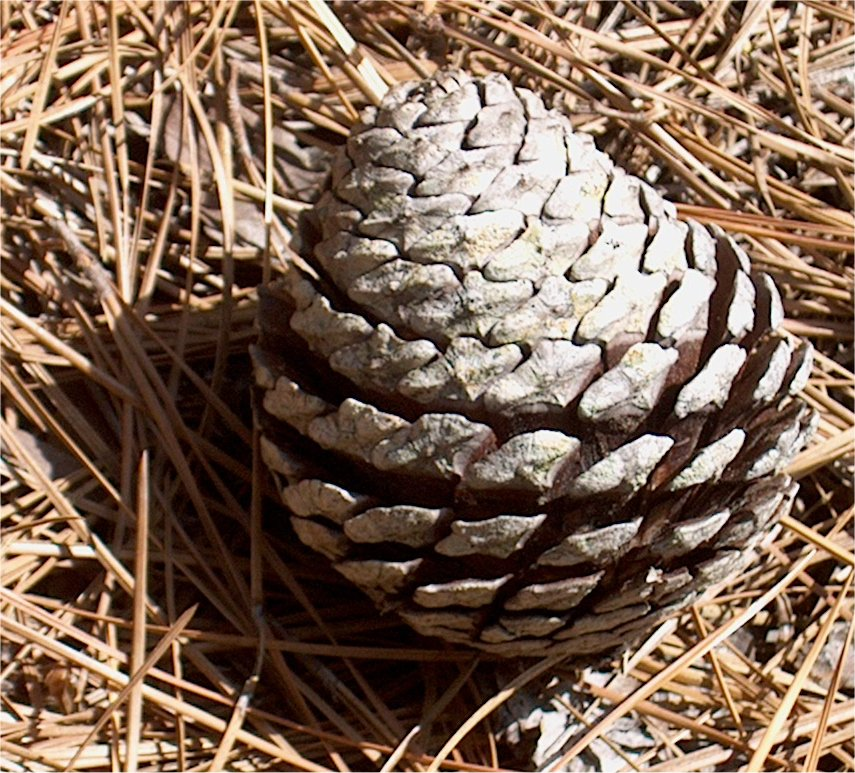
Cone

=== Similar species ===
Pinus rigida (pitch pine) similarly produces needles and little branches directly from the trunk, but pitch pine only grows in drier areas. P. serotina can be distinguished from the common P. taeda (loblolly pine) by its ability to grow needles directly from the trunk and its female cones, which are as broad as they are long, with weak prickles.

== Taxonomy ==
Pinus serotina was described in 1803 by André Michaux. Pinus is a large genus of evergreen conifer trees. The species name serotina is derived from their cones being serotinous, meaning they may remain closed for several years before they release their seeds. Historically, this species has been viewed as a subspecies of Pinus taeda and Pinus rigida (in 1880).

== Distribution and habitat ==
Pinus serotina is found in the southeastern portion of the Atlantic Plain of the United States, from southern New Jersey south to Florida and west to southern Alabama. It may be starting to spread west towards Mississippi and Tennessee.

The species is primarily found in wet and poorly drained sites, most commonly in or near swamps, ponds, bays, marshes, and pocosins. It is often associated with long-leaf pine, Pinus palustris, due to similar requirements for frequent fire. Pond pines need fire to germinate. Pinus serotina is commonly found in wet and poorly drained sites, but it will grow very well in mineral soils. It thrives in flatwoods, flatwoods bogs, savannas, and barrens.

At the north end of its range, pond pine intergrades and hybridizes with pitch pine (P. rigida); it is distinguished from that species by longer needles and on average slightly larger cones. Some botanists treat pond pine as a subspecies of pitch pine. Pinus serotina habitat includes mild and humid climates. The average temperature ranges from 45 to 80 °F (7 to 27 °C). The more extreme temperature ranges recorded for P. serotina are −10 and 110 °F (−23 and 43 °C). The average annual precipitation in the range of P. serotina is between 1,100 and 1,400 millimetres (44 and 55 in).

== Ecology ==
Pinus serotina stands provide habitat and support for many wildlife species, particularly for birds and mammals in wetlands and flatland environments. The pond pine is intolerant of shade. In order for reproduction to occur, P. serotina needs fire in the form of intense scorching or defoliation. The buds are dormant and protected by the tree's thick bark. When parts of the tree are top killed by fire, epicortical buds can resume growth. Fifteen to twenty seed trees are needed per hectare (6 to 8 per acre) for the sufficient seed set after fire. Without the heat from a fire the seed fall is limited by the serotinous cones of pond pine. Pond pine seedling growth is often limited by the moisture in the soil, lack of nutrients, and competition. Under poor growing conditions pond pine seedlings grow can as little as 30 cm (12 inches) or less per year.

The species is very useful in preventing erosion and improving water quality.

=== Diseases and other issues ===
Several species of bark beetles attack southern pines including pond pine, the beetles include the Southern pine beetle, three species of the Ips engraver beetles, and the black turpentine beetle. These beetle species grind through conducting tissues of their hosts. Phloem damage leads pine needles fading from green, to light green, and death of the tree. These trees also face the eastern pine weevil and are susceptible to wind damage. Pinus serotina also faces red heart disease (Phellinus pini), a fungal disease of pines.

== Conservation status ==
The primary threat to P. serotina is habitat loss of wet flatlands, peat-rich soils, sandy wet flatlands, and pocosins. Pinus serotina allows for trees to regenerate by coppicing. Thus disturbances (e.g. fire) are required for this species to persist and recruit. Pinus serotina is listed by the IUCN Red List as a species of Least Concern for extinction.

== Uses ==
Even though the Pinus serotina has poor form and relatively slow growth, it can produce economically valuable tree stands of for pulpwood and saw timber where other trees will not grow. Tan or green dyes can be obtained from the needles of P. serotina. A vanillin flavoring is obtained from the byproducts of the pulpwood's resins. It is suggested that P. serotina might be a valuable remedy to treat the kidney, and can be administered as a rub or in a steam bath. Pinus serotina may be useful in treating diseases of the mucous membrane and respiratory complaints.
