= Doe Hill Mountain =

Mountain in North Carolina, United States

- Location within North Carolina

Highest point
- Elevation: 4,035 ft (1,230 m)
- Coordinates: 35°58′16″N 81°58′24″W

Geography
- Location: Avery County, North Carolina, U.S.
- Parent range: Blue Ridge Mountains
- Topo map: USGS Linville Falls

Doe Hill Mountain is a mountain in the North Carolina High Country, located northwest of Linville Falls. Though the mountain itself is undeveloped, it is flanked on all sides by tree farms and the following roads: US 221 to the east, NC 194 to the north, US 19E to the west and Brushy Creek Road (SR-1101) to the south. Pink Ridge form from the northern side of the mountain.

The mountain generates feeder streams to the North Toe River.
