= Special routes of U.S. Route 421 =

Special routes of U.S. Route 421

Highway system
- United States Numbered Highway System; List; Special; Divided

Several special routes of U.S. Route 421 exist. In order from south to north they are as follows.

== North Carolina ==
=== Wilmington truck route ===
U.S. Highway 421 Truck
- Location: Wilmington, North Carolina
- Length: 1.0 mi (1.6 km)
- Existed: 2009–present

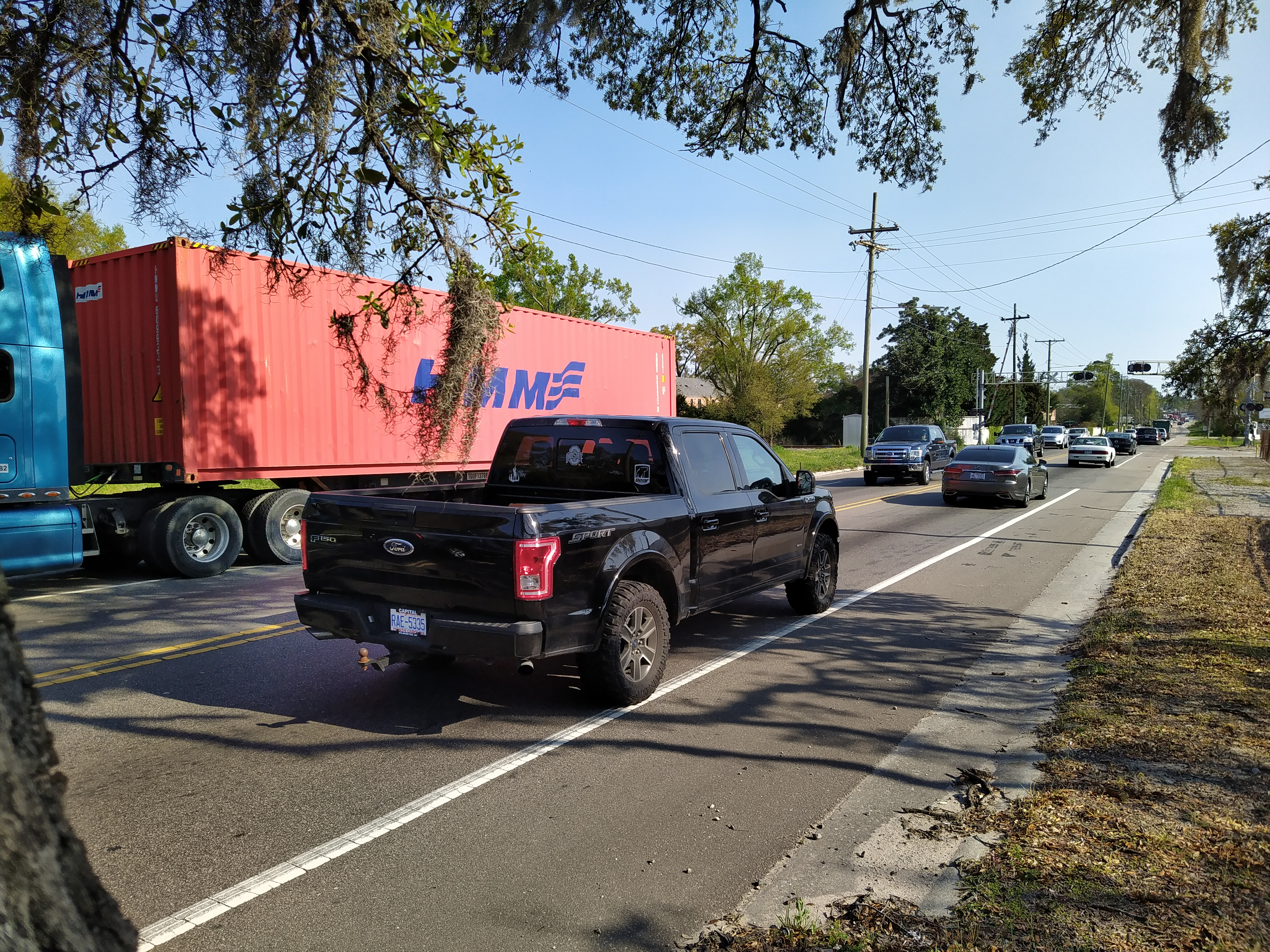
South Front Street looking south as it passes by the Wilmington Terminal tank farm.

U.S. Route 421 Truck (US 421 Truck), established in March 2009, is a truck route along Front Street from US 421 (Burnett Boulevard) to the Cape Fear Memorial Bridge.

The entire route is in Wilmington, New Hanover County.

mi	km	Destinations	Notes
0.0	0.0	US 421 (Burnett Boulevard) – Carolina Beach	US 421 Truck begins
1.0	1.6	US 76 west / US 421 north / US 17 Bus. south – Leland, Whiteville, Clinton	US 421 Truck ends
1.000 mi = 1.609 km; 1.000 km = 0.621 mi

=== Sanford business loop ===
U.S. Highway 421 Business
- Location: Sanford, North Carolina
- Length: 9.9 mi (15.9 km)
- Existed: 2015–present

U.S. Route 421 Business (US 421 Bus) is a 9.9-mile (15.9 km) multi-lane business loop along Horner Boulevard, through downtown Sanford. Approved by AASHTO on May 3, 2013, its official establishment is dependent on the completion of the Sanford bypass, which mainline US 421 will be rerouted along, sharing with already established NC 87 Bypass.

The entire route is in Lee County.

Location	mi	km	Destinations	Notes
Sanford	0.0	0.0	US 421 / NC 87 Byp. – Greensboro, Fayetteville	
Sanford	0.7	1.1	NC 87 south – Fayetteville	South end of NC 87 overlap
Sanford	1.8	2.9	NC 42 east / NC 78 west (Main Street) – Fuquay-Varina	East end of NC 42 overlap
Sanford	4.4	7.1	US 1 Bus. / NC 42 west (Carthage Street)	West end of NC 42 overlap
Sanford	5.8	9.3	US 1 / US 15 / US 501 / NC 87 north – Raleigh, Southern Pines	North end of NC 87 overlap
	9.9	15.9	US 421 – Fayetteville, Greensboro	
1.000 mi = 1.609 km; 1.000 km = 0.621 mi: Concurrency terminus

=== North Wilkesboro business loop ===
U.S. Highway 421 Business
- Location: North Wilkesboro, North Carolina
- Length: 6.2 mi (10.0 km)
- Existed: 1969–present

U.S. Route 421 Business (US 421 Bus) was established in November 1969 as a renumbering of all US 421A and part of mainline US 421. The 6.2 miles (10.0 km) route begins along Statesville Avenue heading into downtown North Wilkesboro, where it follows along Main Street, 6th Street, and D Street. It reconnects with mainline US 421 in Wilkesboro.

The entire route is in Wilkes County.

Location	mi	km	Destinations	Notes
	0.0	0.0	US 421 / NC 115 south – Winston-Salem, Boone, Statesville	South end of NC 115 overlap
North Wilkesboro	3.0	4.8	NC 18 north / NC 268 east – Sparta, Elkin	North end of NC 18/NC 115 and east end of NC 268 overlap
North Wilkesboro	3.5	5.6	NC 18 south / NC 268 west – Wilkesboro	South end of NC 18 and west end of NC 268 overlap
Wilkesboro	6.2	10.0	US 421 / NC 16 – Winston-Salem, Boone, Jefferson	
1.000 mi = 1.609 km; 1.000 km = 0.621 mi: Concurrency terminus

=== Boone truck route ===
U.S. Highway 421 Truck
- Location: Boone, North Carolina
- Length: 4.8 mi (7.7 km)

U.S. Route 421 Truck (US 421 Truck), is an alternate route for trucks in Boone, which are not allowed to go through the downtown area. The route starts south on NC 105 from US 421 King Street to NC Highway 105 Bypass, then back to US 421 west of Boone. US 221 Truck and US 321 Truck also overlap along the route.

The entire route is in Boone, Watauga County.

mi	km	Destinations	Notes
0.0	0.0	US 221 north / US 421 / NC 194 (Kings Street) – Todd, West Jefferson, Wilkesboro	North end of US 221 and NC 105 overlap
0.8	1.3	US 221 south / US 321 (Blowing Rock Road) – Blowing Rock, ASU	South end of US 221 overlap
3.0	4.8	NC 105 south – Linville, Banner Elk	South end of NC 105 overlap
4.8	7.7	US 321 / US 421 / NC 194 – Mountain City, Boone	
1.000 mi = 1.609 km; 1.000 km = 0.621 mi: Concurrency terminus

== Virginia ==
=== Gate City business loop ===
U.S. Route 421 Business
- Location: Gate City, Virginia
- Length: 2.65 mi (4.26 km)

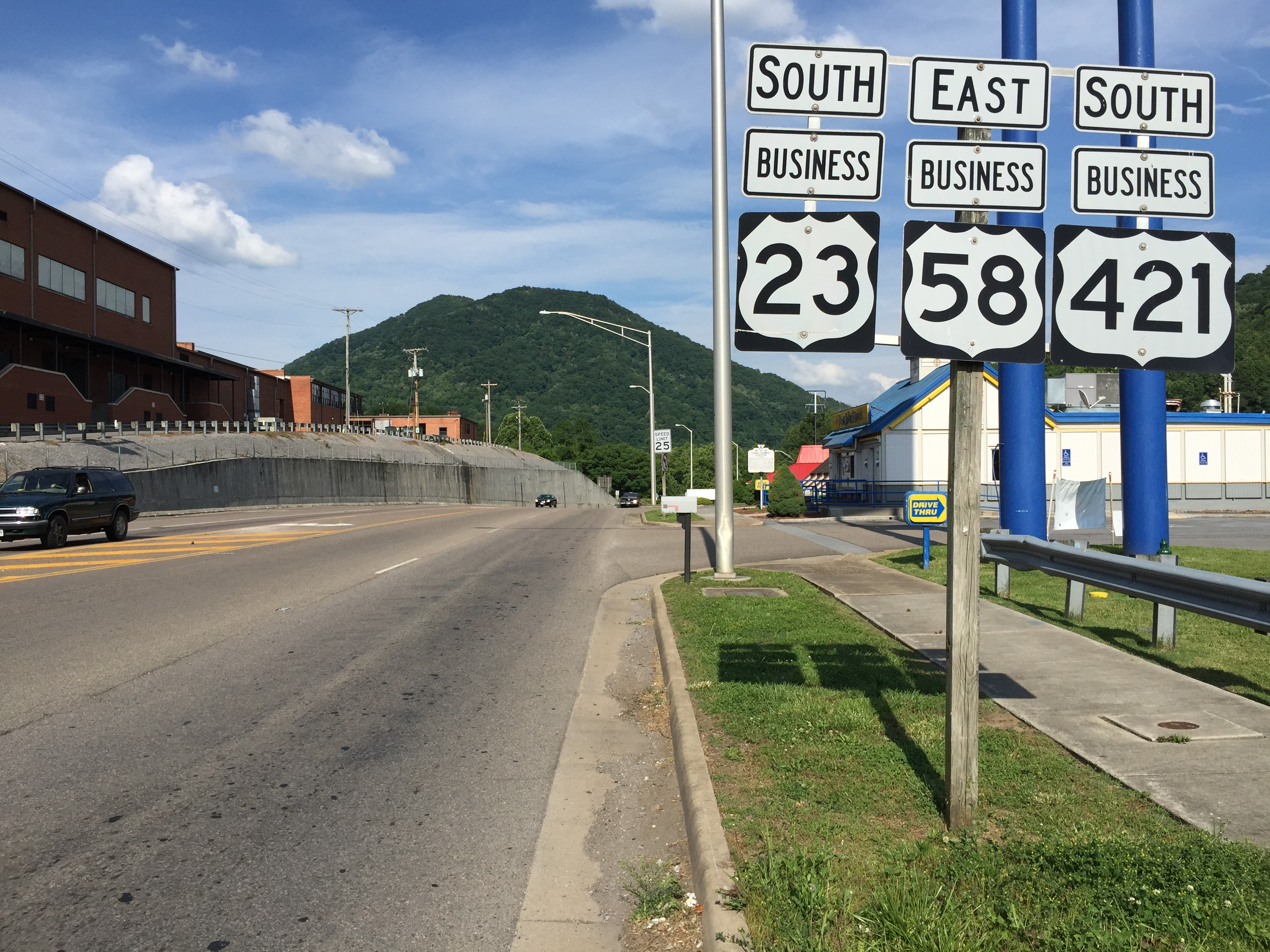
US 23 Bus./US 58 Bus./US 421 Bus. in Gate City

U.S. Route 421 Business (US 421 Bus) is a business route of US 421 in Scott County. The business route is co-existent with US 23 Business and US 58 Business through Gate City. US 421 Business begins at the east end of the town at an intersection with US 421, US 23 and US 58. The business route heads west along Kane Street, which crosses Norfolk Southern Railway's Appalachia Division rail line on its way to the downtown area, where the route meets the southern end of SR 71 (Jackson Street). US 421 Business turns west onto Jackson Street and parallels the rail line to the business route's western end at an interchange with US 421, US 23, and US 58 just west of the western town limit of Gate City.

== Former ==
=== Wilmington business loop ===
U.S. Highway 421 Business
- Location: Wilmington, North Carolina
- Length: 2.4 mi (3.9 km)
- Existed: 1970–1979

U.S. Route 421 Business (US 421 Bus) was established by 1970 as a renumbering of mainline US 421 along Third Street to the Isabel Stellings Holmes Bridge. The business loop was decommissioned by 1979.

=== Clinton alternate route ===
U.S. Highway 421A
- Location: Clinton, North Carolina
- Existed: 1952–1960

U.S. Route 421 Alternate (US 421A), was established by 1952 when mainline US 421 was bypassed west. It followed Lisbon Street and McKay Streets, with a partial overlap with US 701A. In 1960, the route was renumbered as US 421 Business.

=== Clinton business loop ===
U.S. Highway 421 Business
- Location: Clinton, North Carolina
- Existed: 1960–1963

U.S. Route 421 Business (US 421 Bus) was established in 1960 as a renumbering of US 421A through downtown Clinton, via Lisbon Street and McKoy Streets. By 1963 it was decommissioned.

=== North Wilkesboro alternate route ===
U.S. Highway 421A
- Location: North Wilkesboro, North Carolina
- Length: 4.3 mi (6.9 km)
- Existed: 1957–1969

U.S. Route 421 Alternate (US 421A), was established in 1957 when mainline US 421 was bypassed south through Wilkesboro; the old alignment continued to go through downtown North Wilkesboro via D Street. On November, 1969, it was renumbered as part of US 421 Business.

== See also ==
- List of special routes of the United States Numbered Highway System
