= U.S. Route 421 in North Carolina =

Highway in North Carolina

U.S. Highway 421
- US 421 highlighted in red

Route information
- Auxiliary route of US 21
- Maintained by NCDOT
- Length: 328 mi (528 km)
- Existed: 1931–present
- Tourist routes: Cape Fear Historic Byway; U.S. 421 Scenic Byway

Major junctions
- South end: NC 211 / Fort Fisher-Southport Ferry at Fort Fisher
- I-140 near Wilmington; I-95 in Dunn; US 1 / US 15 / US 501 / NC 87 in Sanford; US 64 in Siler City; I-85 near Pleasant Garden; I-73 / US 220 in Greensboro; I-40 / I-840 in Greensboro; I-74 in Kernersville; US 52 / NC 8 in Winston-Salem; I-77 near Brooks Crossroads
- North end: US 421 / SR 34 at the Tennessee state line near Trade, TN

Location
- Country: United States
- State: North Carolina
- Counties: New Hanover, Brunswick, Pender, Sampson, Duplin, Harnett, Lee, Chatham, Randolph, Guilford, Forsyth, Yadkin, Wilkes, Watauga

Highway system
- United States Numbered Highway System; List; Special; Divided; North Carolina Highway System; Interstate; US; State; Scenic
← NC 417	→ I-440

U.S. Route 421 (US 421) is part of the United States Numbered Highway System that runs from Fort Fisher, North Carolina to Michigan City, Indiana. In the U.S. state of North Carolina, US 421 travels 328 miles (528 km) from its southern terminus at Fort Fisher to the Tennessee state line near the community of Zionville, North Carolina. US 421 traverses the state from east to west travelling from the coastal plains to Appalachian Mountains. It provides an important connection between the cities of Wilmington, Sanford, Greensboro, Winston-Salem, and Boone. Despite being signed as north–south, much of the routing of US 421 in North Carolina runs in an east–west direction, particularly between Greensboro and the Tennessee state line. Portions of US 421 have been upgraded to freeway standards including the majority of its routing between Sanford and North Wilkesboro.

US 421 was established in 1931 between Greensboro and Boone, North Carolina replacing North Carolina Highway 60 (NC 60). In 1932, the highway was extended northwest through Sugar Grove to Mountain City, Tennessee, and southeast along NC 60 to Wilmington. US 421 was extended south from Wilmington to Fort Fisher in 1936, replacing NC 40. Since 1936, the highway has been upgraded and readjusted throughout North Carolina.

A majority of the highway is part of the North Carolina Strategic Highway Corridors system. Because of this designation, the state has made numerous changes converting a rural two-lane highway into a major freeway/expressway with 4 or more lanes. Numerous former segments of the highway named "Old U.S. Route 421" are found along the entire route.

== Route description ==
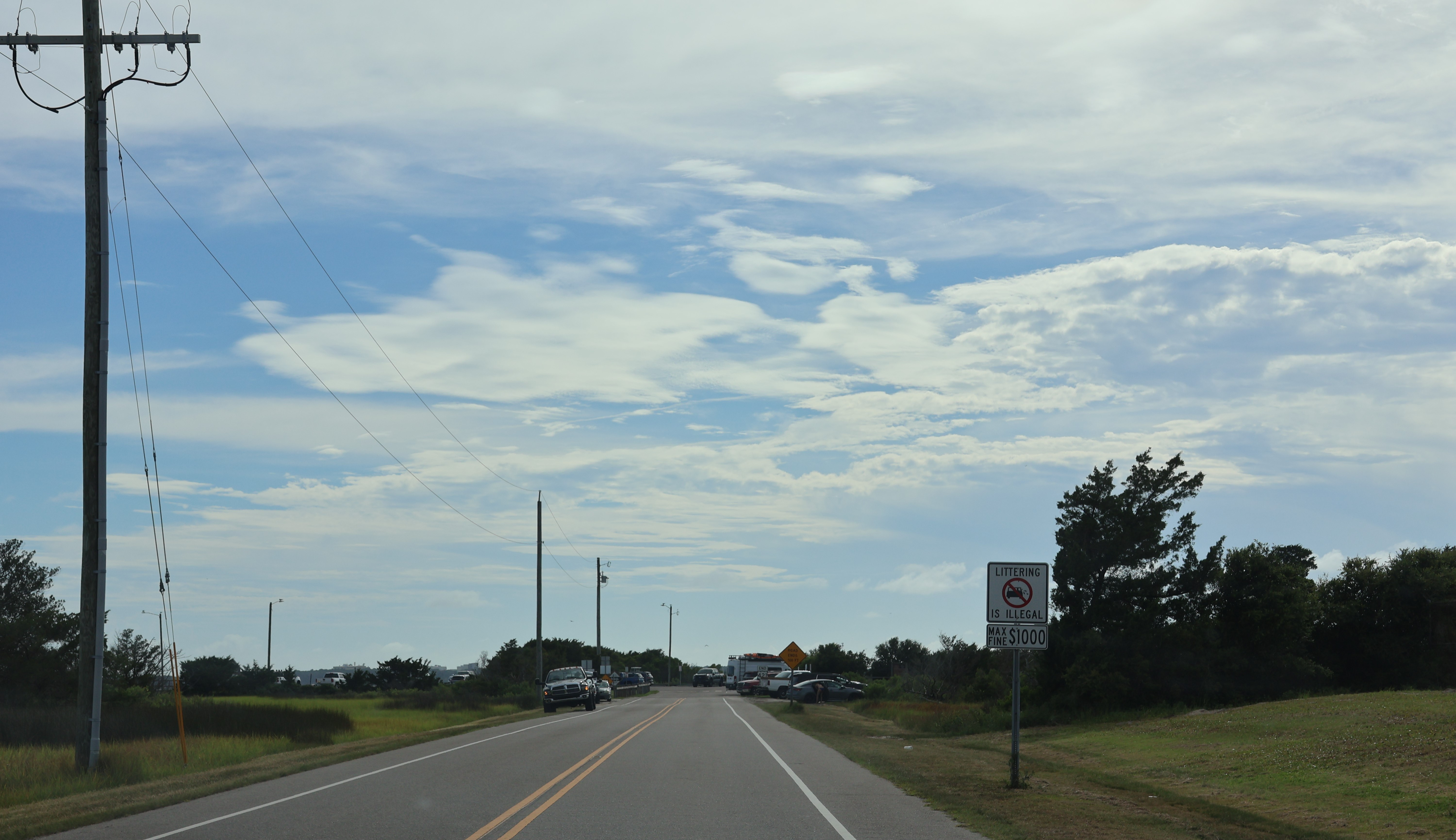
Southern terminus of US 421 near Fort Fisher State Recreation Area

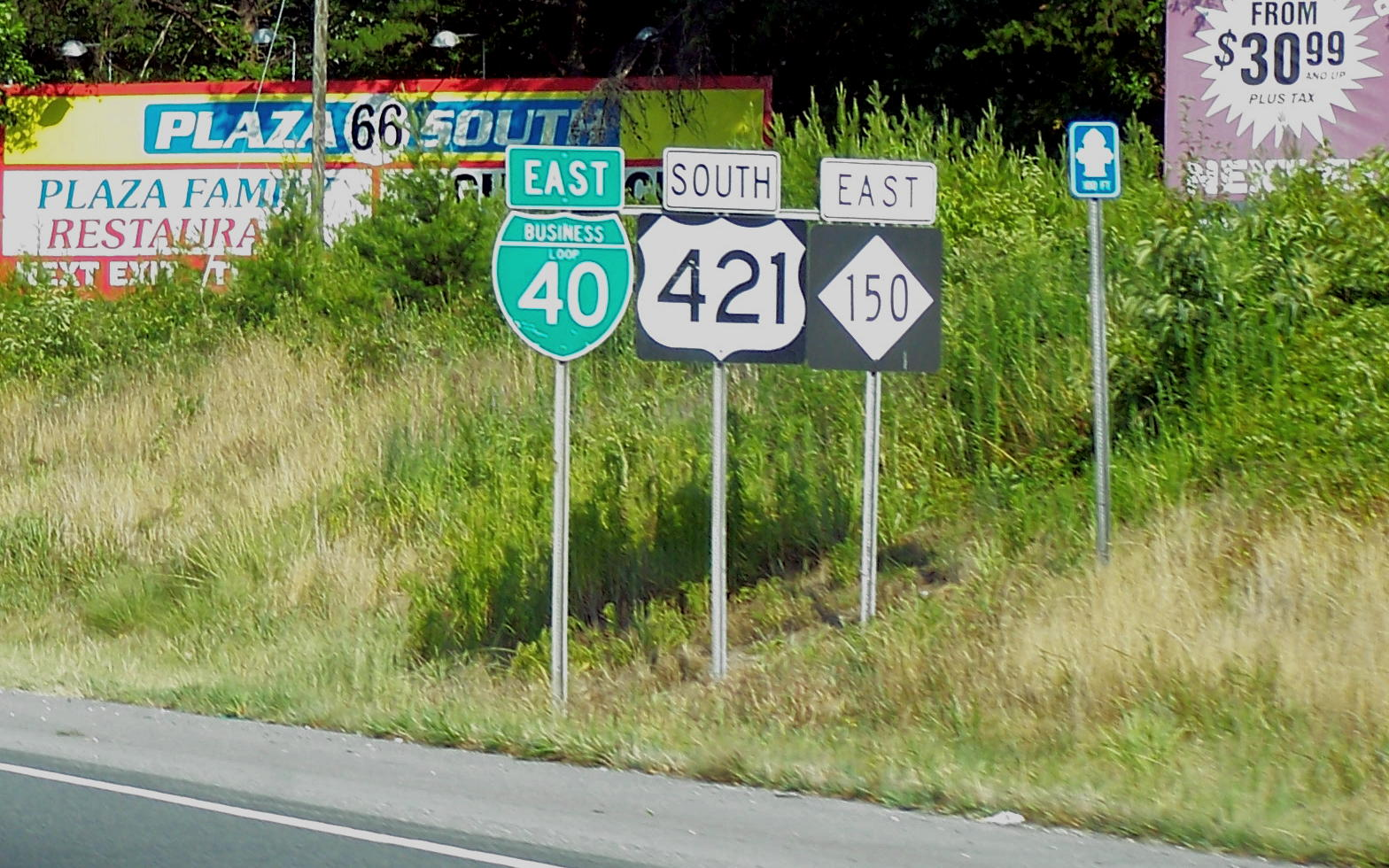
I-40 BUS/US 421/NC 150 near Kernersville. I-40 Business has since been decommissioned.

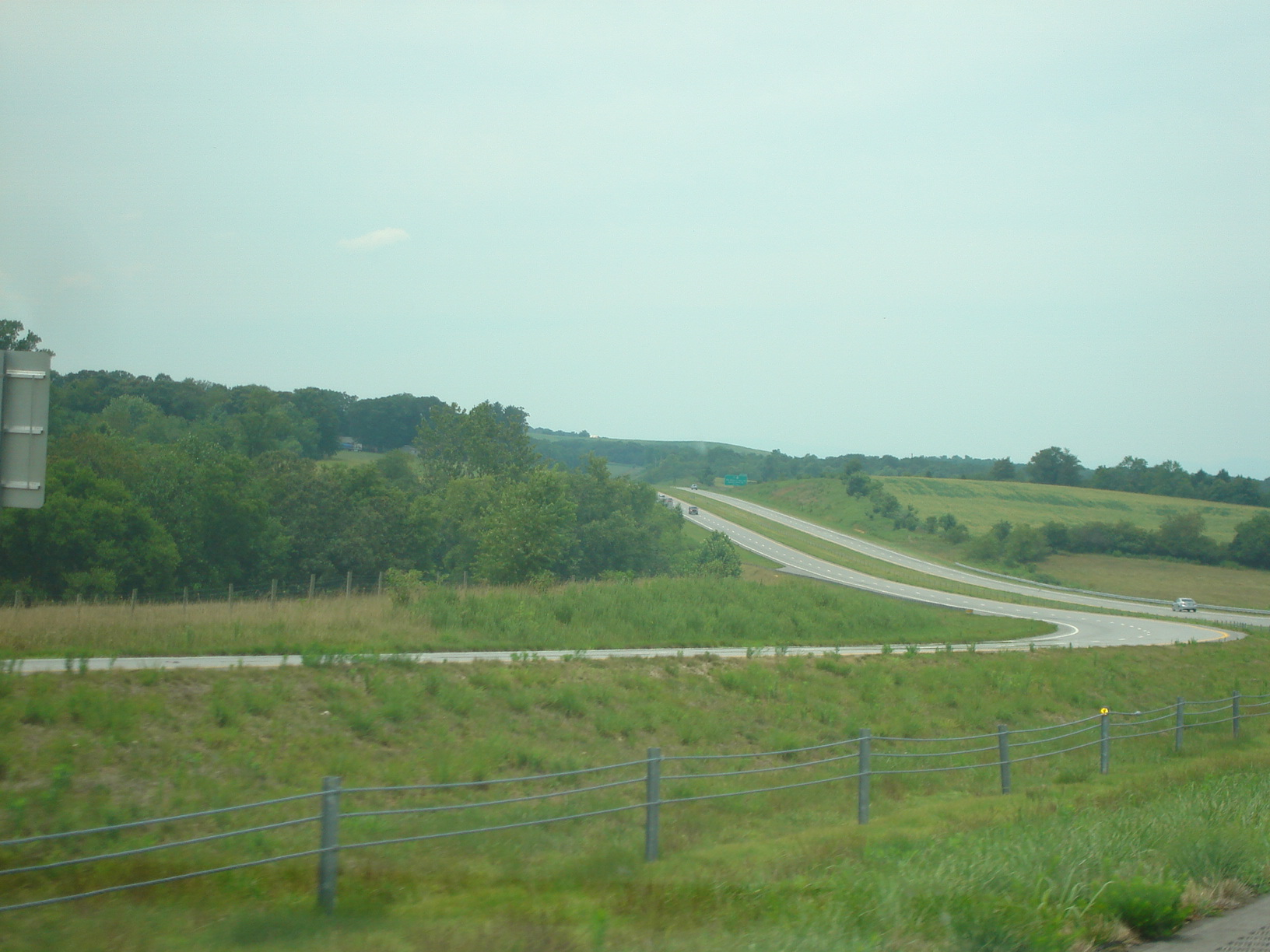
US 421 South near the Red White and Blue Road (exit 276) in eastern Wilkes County

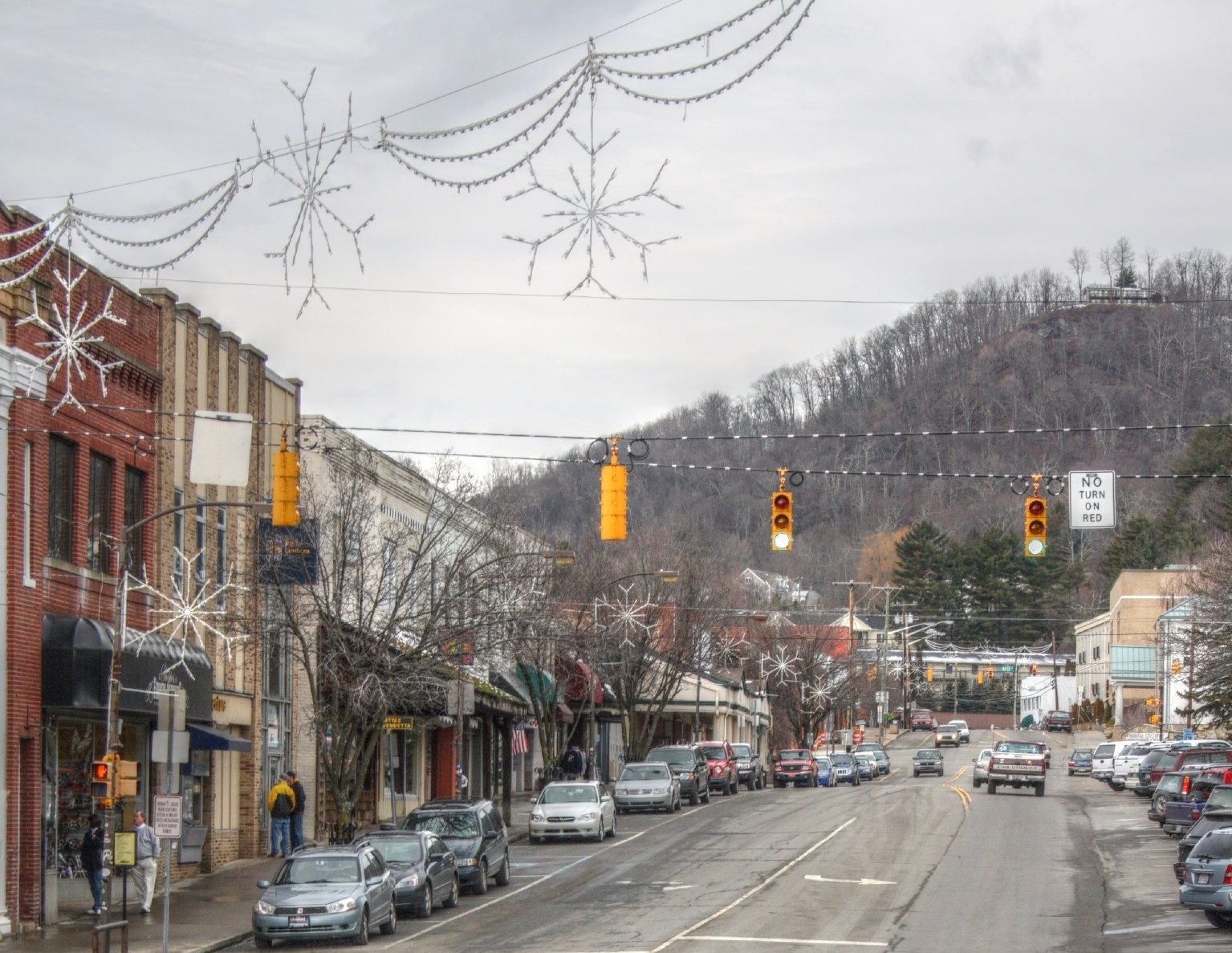
King Street (US 421), going through downtown Boone

US 421 starts at a parking/dock area on the Cape Fear side of Pleasure Island. Within one-quarter mile (0.40 km), US 421 passes through its unsigned junction with NC 211 and the approach to the Fort Fisher Ferry Terminal, where travelers can board to cross the Cape Fear River toward Southport. Immediately after the ferry terminal is Fort Fisher State Recreation Area, where the first and second battles of Fort Fisher took place.

The highway continues north, going through popular tourist destinations in New Hanover county: Kure Beach, and Carolina Beach. Eventually, US 421 crosses the Cape Fear River and enters downtown Wilmington.

At Wooster Street, it goes west, overlapping with several other highways and funnels through Brunswick County before returning in northwestern New Hanover County; there it links with Interstate 140 (I-140) before continuing north towards Clinton.

From about three miles (4.8 km) north of the I-140 interchange, the road remains a four-lane divided highway for another ten miles (16 km). After its intersection with NC 210, it becomes a rural two-lane highway for much of its remainder until Dunn. The exception is in Clinton, where it follows Faircloth Freeway to bypass the city, running concurrent to US 701 for about four miles (6.4 km). There is one rest area located just north of Delway. US 421 meets I-95 in Dunn. From Wilmington to Dunn, the route parallels I-40 approximately ten miles (16 km) to US 421's east.

After crossing downtown Dunn and Erwin immediately to the west, US 421 becomes a four-lane divided highway again until reaching Lillington, with a short segment in Buies Creek containing a center lane and reduced speed limit as it crosses Campbell University. Upon reaching the junction with US 401, NC 27, and NC 210, all four routes collect onto a thoroughfare heading south over the Cape Fear River into downtown Lillington. US 421 then splits off to the west, following two-lane Front Street until Sanford (though speed limit never actually increases).

Upon reaching Sanford, US 421 formerly followed Horner Boulevard with NC 87 to cross downtown, but it is now rerouted onto the recently completed Sanford Bypass, the entirety of which is freeway. It runs concurrent with NC 87 Bypass until the US 1/US 15/US 501/NC 87 interchange, from which it continues until the end of the bypass near Cumnock.

For the rest of its route until Wilkesboro, US 421 remains almost entirely free-flowing. It is an expressway from Sanford to just south of Siler City, bypassing Goldston, Bear Creek, and Siler City. From here to the Greensboro Urban Loop, US 421 becomes a freeway, bypassing the center of Staley, Liberty, and Julian.

Near Pleasant Garden, US 421 joins I-85 on the Greensboro Urban Loop, staying with the loop as I-85 leaves and I-73 joins it. Another six miles (9.7 km) later, US 421 leaves the Greensboro Urban Loop and merges I-40 westward. The concurrency continues west of Greensboro, where US 421 diverges with Interstate 40, and traverses along Salem Parkway inside Downtown Kernersville. The parkway comes to a junction with the Winston-Salem Northern Beltway (I-74) before entering enter the center of Downtown Winston-Salem. Salem Parkway uses the exit numbers of the mileage of US 421 in its entire stretch.

Salem Parkway exits the center of Downtown Winston-Salem and comes to the parclo interchange with Stratford Road (US 158 westward), which gives access to Thruway Center. This occurs before US 421 comes to the diamond interchange with Knollwood Street, cloverleaf interchange with the Silas Creek Parkway (NC 67), and the four-level stack/cloverleaf with I-40 and the Proposed I-777. US 421 exits Salem parkway at the junction with I-40, and continues northwest onto the Proposed I-777. US 421 also continues the Mall District, with exits to Jonestown Road (Hanes Mall Boulevard directly connects to southbound US 421), Peace Haven Road, and Lewisville-Clemmons Road, before it continues west, and enters into the town of Lewisville. US 421 crosses the Yadkin River, and enters into Yadkinville, before to a cloverleaf junction with I-77, west of the town. US 421 continues near North Wilkesboro, where it also goes near North Wilkesboro Speedway (access to the speedway is via exit 282), alongside coming near the visitor center built in 2009, serving the first environmentally friendly rest area in the state, located at mile marker 283. As US 421 enters Wilkesboro city limits, it downgrades to an expressway. It is also this area, where the western terminus to the Proposed I-777 is located.

As it leaves Wilkesboro, US 421 begins a gradual climb in elevation, until approximately five miles (8.0 km) from Deep Gap, where it climbs up the steep escarpment along the eastern edge of the Blue Ridge Mountains. Access to the Blue Ridge Parkway is located at Deep Gap, as US 421 continues on towards Boone.

As US 421 approaches Boone, the expressway comes to an end just before an intersection with Old US 421. The road continues into Boone as four lane boulevard, becoming two lanes at the intersection with US 321. US 321 north, US 421 north, and NC 194 south all run concurrent through the downtown area via King Street. After leaving Boone, US 421 continues on as a two-lane road to the Tennessee state line, heading on to Mountain City.

== Designations ==
US 421 overlaps with two state scenic byways: the Cape Fear Historic Byway, in downtown Wilmington, and the U.S. 421 Scenic Byway, between Deep Gap and Boone. Two of North Carolina's Bicycle Routes run concurrent for portions of US 421. North Carolina Bicycle Route 5 is concurrent from US 421's southern terminus at Fort Fisher to north of Snows Cut, through downtown Wilmington to Blueberry Road near Montague, North Carolina, and a short portion near Coats. A small part of North Carolina Bicycle Route 3 is concurrent with US 421 in downtown Wilmington.

== History ==
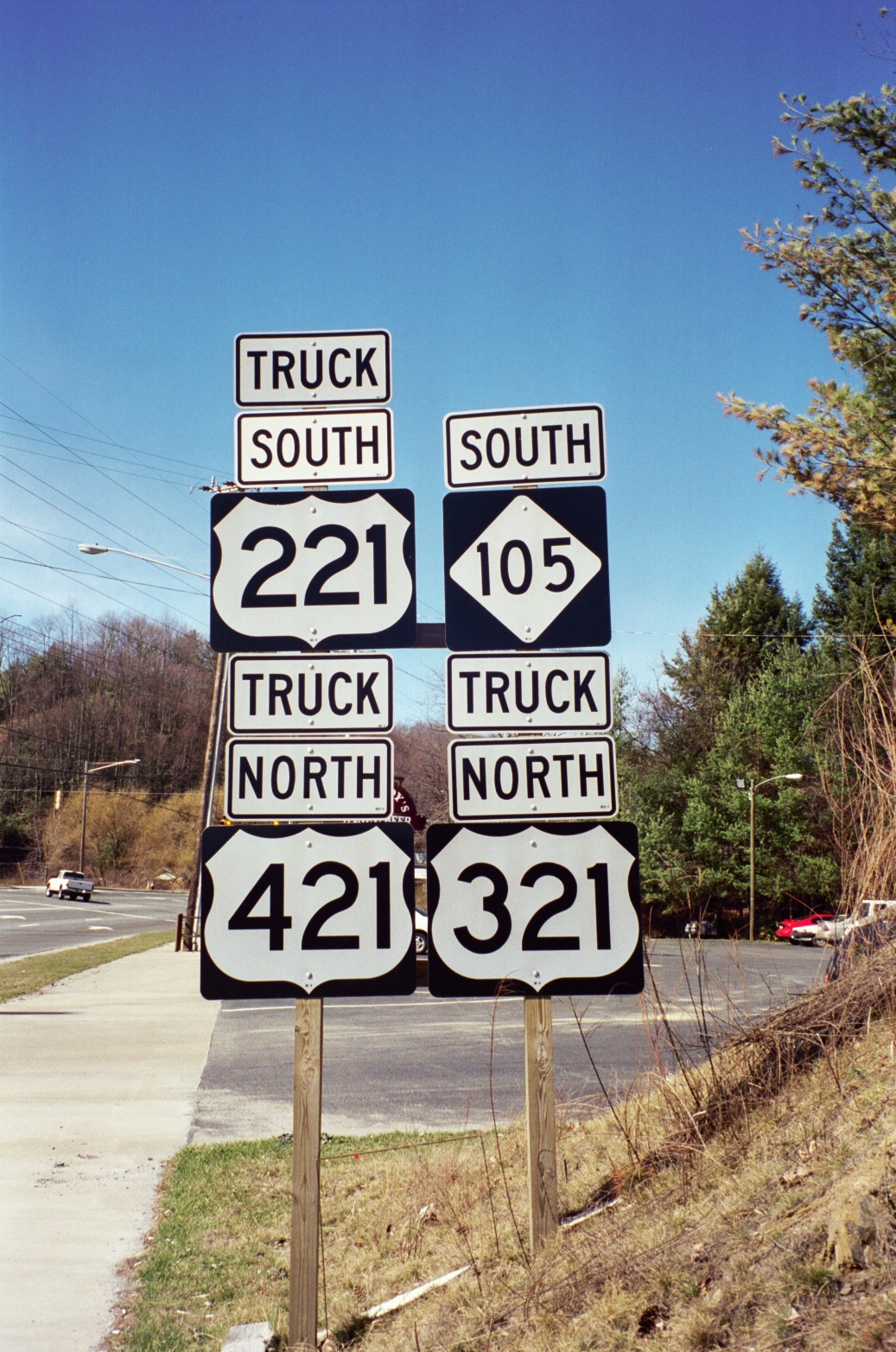
Overlapping US 221, US 321, and US 421. Truck routes along NC 105 in Boone

In 1931, US 421 officially began appearing on highway maps starting from Winston-Salem (junction with US 70/170) to Boone at King/Hardin Street intersection (junction with US 221/321). It was solely within the state of North Carolina and was completely overlapped with NC 60. US 421 was extended both north and south in 1932. North from Boone, it extended to Sugar Grove where it then replaced US 321 heading towards Mountain City, Tennessee; US 321 was redirected towards Elizabethton, Tennessee. From Winston-Salem, the highway was routed to Wilmington following NC 60. In 1933, the highway was realigned around Boone (using a straighter alignment) and in Greensboro (Market Street). NC 60 was completely removed from its original route in 1934, leaving US 421. The NC 60 designation was reused on a short highway in Cherokee County, where it continues to this day. US 421 was extended south from Wilmington to Carolina Beach, Kure Beach, and Fort Fisher, replacing NC 40, in 1936.

Between 1951 and 1952, US 421 was rerouted around Clinton (on what would be today's Faircloth Freeway). The Wilkesboro segment was realigned through town to North Wilkesboro. In 1954–1955, US 421 was rerouted going west out of Wilmington via US 17/74/76, then north following NC 133. In 1957–1958, US 421 was realigned onto a straighter routing between Deep Gap and Wilkesboro. US 421 was redirected out of North Wilkesboro, old routing was renumbered as US 421-A (Now US 421 Business). US 421 was placed onto one-way streets within Winston-Salem (using 4th and 5th streets), it was also rerouted in Greensboro going from Market Street to the freeway O. Henry Blvd. Between Erwin and Dunn, US 421 was realigned onto a new four-lane expressway.

From 1962 to 1963, US 421 was realigned onto a new road near Sugar Grove and Zionville, leaving the communities of Amantha and Mabel. Between Yadkinville and Winston-Salem, US 421 was given its current alignment, expanding to a freeway after the Yadkin River to I-40; it then overlapped with I-40 (later called Business 40) through downtown Winston-Salem. In Harnett County, US 421 was moved north, avoiding the community of Mamers, and enters Lillington via Front Street. US 421 was straightened out through Harrells. Between 1964 and 1968, US 421 was routed onto one-way streets through downtown Greensboro (Market Street and Madison/Gaston Avenues). US 421 was also rerouted onto the new Faircloth Freeway in Clinton. In 1969–1970, US 421 was rerouted onto the new Cape Fear Bridge in Wilmington. US 421 was also realigned around Bonlee and Bear Creek.

The bypass around Wilkesboro was completed between 1971 and 1984. The segment between Greensboro and Staley was upgraded to expressway standards (Joseph M. Hunt Jr Expressway) and bypassed the communities of Pleasant Garden, Climax, Julian, and Liberty. US 421 was rerouted in Sanford, avoiding the community of Broadway. The Siler City bypass was completed in 1987–1990. US 421 was rerouted going north around Greensboro then going south on Henry Boulevard (US 29). From 1994 to 1999, US 421 was removed from all surface roads from Kernersville to Greensboro, following I-40 to Joseph M. Hunt Jr Expressway.

Between 2000 and 2003, US 421 was realigned and widened to 4-lane freeway between Yadkinville to Wilkesboro and a 4-lane expressway between Wilkesboro to Boone (though some parts already pre-existed for before 2000). This completed US 421 as a 4-lane (or more) highway from Sanford to Boone. US 421 was realigned in Greensboro during 2008 to follow the new southern loop, overlapping with I-73 and I-85 to Joseph M. Hunt Jr Expressway. This was done to give drivers a direct route to Winston-Salem; I-40 returned to its original routing nearly one year on the southern loop. A 1.1-mile (1.8 km) section in Boone, known as King Street, was widened from four to six lanes with a raised concrete median from US 321 (Hardin Street) to east of NC 194 (Jefferson Road) in 2012. The project cost $16.2 million.

=== Project reconstruction of highway in Winston-Salem ===
In Winston-Salem, a 1-mile (1.6 km) section from west of Fourth Street to east of Church Street was reconstructed between 2018 and 2020 to completely upgrade and streamline. The project included removing the existing pavement and replacing it with new concrete pavement, upgrade and modernize entrance and exit ramps, and replace most of the bridges on and over the freeway. Work began on this rehabilitation in 2018 with the closure of several miles of U.S. 421. The closed section was reopened earlier than expected in early February 2020. Concurrent with the rehabilitation of the route, the Interstate 40 Business designation was dropped from the entire route, with the route remaining U.S. 421, exits renumbered to US 421 mileage, and the highway taking on a new name, The Salem Parkway.

== Future ==
=== Future Interstate 685 ===
Future Interstate 685
- Location: Greensboro–Dunn

In September 2019, the Greensboro Urban Area Transportation Advisory Committee (GUATAC) passed a resolution in support of giving US 421 interstate designation between I-40 in Greensboro and I-95 near Fayetteville and bringing it up to interstate standards. The resolution noted that an interstate along US 421 would provide a “valuable alternate route for military and freight traffic” as well as “additional evacuation routes and relief and recovery routes to the region.” The resolution also stated that US 421 becoming an interstate would “support economic development, including the four designated megasites in the Carolina Core.” The resolution states that the North Carolina Board of Transportation has already passed a resolution in support of the future interstate designation for US 421.

The passage of the Infrastructure Investment and Jobs Act in November 2021, proposed to upgrade US 421 to Interstate status, possibly as I-685. The new Interstate designation would overlay the existing freeway from I-85 south of Greensboro to the east side of Sanford, and then follow a new alignment from Sanford to I-95 near current exit 70. The bill contains language designating the US 421 corridor as High Priority Corridor 92 between I-85 and I-95. Seven counties along the proposed route have explicitly endorsed the new Interstate designation. In May 2022, AASHTO approved the designation of the corridor as Future I-685.

In June 2022, the Wilmington Metropolitan Planning Organization (WMPO) passed a resolution asking NCDOT to extend the planned southern terminus of Future I-685 from Dunn to Wilmington, suggesting the corridor would improve connections to large population centers, military bases, and the Port of Wilmington; provide an improved coastal evacuation route; and enhance the economy of the region. But concerns were also raised on how the route would be relatively parallel with I-40, which also goes through the region. Currently, no plans to implement the resolution have been made by NCDOT.

=== Proposed Piedmont Triad Interstate spur ===
In August 2022, the Piedmont Triad Partnership proposed upgrading the existing US 421 to an Interstate from Winston-Salem to Wilkesboro. The western terminus would be in the central areas of Wilkesboro, while the eastern terminus would be inside Winston-Salem. The Wilkes County commissioners approved a resolution supporting action that is part of the process of getting US 421 designated an interstate the same month. In November 2022, the Forsyth County Board of Commissioners passed a resolution also in favor of the effort. In April 2024, a local organization, called Carolina Core, made the recommendation to designate the spur route as I-777.

=== Cape Fear Skyway ===
In New Hanover and Brunswick counties, the Cape Fear Skyway has begun its project development studies (since 2007) to build a toll road and bridge that will bypass Wilmington. Early estimates range from $950 million to $1.1 billion. The environmental impact study was completed in 2014, a record of decision and a complete financial feasibility was done in 2015. The project has been re-prioritized and delayed numerous times. In 2018, NCDOT stated that construction would not start before 2029. While in August 2019, NCDOT halted design and planning of the bridge, putting the project on hold indefinitely.

== Junction list ==
County	Location	mi	km	Exit	Destinations	Notes
New Hanover	Fort Fisher	0.2	0.32		NC 211 north – Southport	US 421 begins .2 miles (0.32 km) south of terminal; Fort Fisher–Southport Ferry
New Hanover	Myrtle Grove	13.5	21.7		NC 132 north (College Road) – Wilmington	Southern terminus of NC 132
New Hanover	Wilmington	15	24		US 117 (Shipyard Boulevard) – Wilmington, State Port	
New Hanover	Wilmington	18	29		US 76 east / US 17 Bus. north (3rd Street) – Wrightsville Beach, Downtown Wilmington	East end of US 76 overlap, north end of US 17 Business overlap
New Hanover	Wilmington	19	31		Front Street	Partial interchange
Brunswick		21	34		US 17 / NC 133 south / US 74 / US 76 west – Bolivia, Southport, Whiteville	South end of US 17/US 17 Business/NC 133 overlap, west end of US 74/76 overlap
New Hanover		22	35		U.S.S. North Carolina Road/Battleship Road	To the N.C. Battleship
New Hanover		24	39		US 74 east / NC 133 north – Wrightsville Beach, Hightsville	East end of US 74 overlap, north end of NC 133 overlap
New Hanover		25.5	41.0		I-140 – Jacksonville, Myrtle Beach	I-140 exit 14
Pender	Long Creek	38.5	62.0		NC 210 – Rocky Point, Currie	Also to Moores Creek National Battlefield on west NC 210
Pender	Malpass Corner	44	71		NC 11 south / NC 53 – Atkinson, Burgaw	South end of NC 11 overlap
Pender		52	84		NC 11 north – Penderlea, Willard	North end of NC 11 overlap
Sampson	Harrells	60	97		NC 41 (Tomahawk Highway/Wallace Highway) – Tomahawk, Wallace	
Duplin	No major junctions					
Sampson	Delway	65	105		NC 903 (Magnolia-Lisbon Road) – Magnolia, Kenansville	
Sampson	Clinton	79	127		US 701 south (Garland Highway) / US 701 Bus. north (Sunset Boulevard) – Garland, Clinton	South end of US 701 overlap
Sampson	Clinton	80	130		To NC 24 east (Tam Road) – Warsaw	
Sampson	Clinton	81	130		NC 24 east (Southwest Boulevard) – Warsaw	Southbound entrance and northbound exit, east end of NC 24 overlap
Sampson	Clinton	82	132		NC 24 west (Sunset Avenue) – Roseboro, Fayetteville	West end of NC 24 overlap
Sampson	Clinton	83	134		US 701 north (Faircloth Freeway) – Newton Grove	North end of US 701 overlap
Sampson		95	153		NC 242 south (Salemburg Highway) – Salemburg, Roseboro	South end of NC 242 overlap
Sampson	Spivey's Corner	99	159		US 13 (Fayetteville Highway/Newton Grove Highway) – Fayetteville, Newton Grove	
Sampson	Spivey's Corner	100	160		NC 242 north (Benson Highway) – Benson	North end of NC 242 overlap
Harnett	Dunn	109	175		I-95 / NC 55 east – Fayetteville, Benson, Newton Grove	East end of NC 55 overlap
Harnett	Dunn	110	180		US 301 (Clinton Avenue) – Fayetteville, Benson	
Harnett	Erwin	114	183		NC 55 north / NC 82 south / NC 217 south (13th Street) – Erwin, Coats	West end of NC 55 overlap
Harnett		119	192		NC 27 east – Coats	East end of NC 27 overlap; Harnett County Airport at intersection
Harnett	Lillington	124	200		US 401 north (Cornelius Harnett Boulevard) / NC 210 north (Main Street) – Fuquay-Varina	North end of US 401 and NC 210 overlap
Harnett	Lillington	125	201		US 401 south / NC 27 east / NC 210 south (Main Street)	South end of US 401/NC 210 overlap, east end of NC 27 overlap
Lee	Sanford	143	230	143	US 421 Bus. north / NC 87 Byp. south – Sanford, Fayetteville	South end of NC 87 Bypass overlap. Signed as exits 143A (south) and 143B (north) southbound.
Lee	Sanford	144	232	144	NC 42 (Broadway Road) – Fuquay-Varina	
Lee	Sanford	145	233	145	Kelly Drive	
Lee	Sanford	148	238	148	Colon Road	
Lee		149	240	149	US 1 / US 15 / US 501 / NC 87 – Raleigh, Southern Pines	Signed as exits 149A (north) and 149B (south); US 1 exit 70, north end of NC 87 Bypass overlap
Lee		153	246	153	US 421 Bus. south (Cumnock Road) – Sanford	
Chatham	Goldston	159	256	159	Pittsboro-Goldston Road	
Chatham		163	262		NC 902 – Pittsboro	
Chatham		168	270	168	Sam Fields Road – Siler City	
Chatham	Siler City	171	275	171	US 64 – Siler City, Pittsboro	
Chatham		174	280	174	Piney Grove Church Road	
Randolph	Staley	180	290	180	Old US Highway 421 – Liberty, Staley	
Randolph	Liberty	181	291	181	NC 49 – Liberty, Ramseur	
Randolph	Liberty	184	296	183	Old Liberty Road – Liberty	
Randolph	Liberty			186	Shiloh Road / Starmount Road	
Randolph	Liberty			187	Julian Airport Road / Dogwood Way	
Randolph	Liberty			188	Colonial Trading Path / Shiloh Road	Under Construction; Conversion to interchanges as a part of the Toyota Greensboro-Randolph Megasite
Guilford	Julian	190	310	190	NC 62 – High Point, Burlington	
Guilford		194.3	312.7	194	Woody Mill Road / Company Mill Road – Climax	
Guilford		196	315	196	Neeley Road / Williams Dairy Road – Climax	
Guilford		197	317	197	I-85 north to I-40 – Durham, Raleigh	North end of I-85 overlap
US 421 overlaps with Interstate 85 (exits 126 to 121), Interstate 73 (exits 97 to 103), and Interstate 40 (exits 212 to 206)
Guilford	Colfax			—	I-40 – Greensboro	Western end of overlap with I-40
Forsyth	Kernersville			221	NC 150 east (Macy Grove Road)	East end of NC 150 overlap
Forsyth	Kernersville			222	NC 66 – Kernersville, Walkertown	
Forsyth	Kernersville			224	South Main Street – Kernersville	
Forsyth	Kernersville			227	I-74 – Wytheville, High Point	Signed as Exits 227A (east) [Opened on September 19, 2026] and 227B (west) [Opened on September 5, 2020]
Forsyth	Winston-Salem			228	Linville Road	
Forsyth	Winston-Salem			230	US 158 east (Reidsville Road) – Walkertown, Reidsville	East end of US 158 overlap; eastbound exit and westbound entrance
Forsyth	Winston-Salem			231	Lowery Street / Fifth Street	Eastbound Lowery Street, westbound Fifth Street
Forsyth	Winston-Salem			232A	Martin Luther King Jr. Drive	To Winston-Salem State University
Forsyth	Winston-Salem			232B-C	US 52 / NC 8 (John Gold Memorial Expressway) – Lexington, Mount Airy, Airport, Salem College, Old Salem	Signed as Exits 232B (north) and 232C (south). US 52 exits 109A-B
Forsyth	Winston-Salem			233A	Main Street / First Street – Old Salem, Salem College	
Forsyth	Winston-Salem			233B	Cherry Street – Convention Center	
Forsyth	Winston-Salem			234A	NC 150 west (Peters Creek Parkway) – Truist Stadium	West end of NC 150 overlap
Forsyth	Winston-Salem			234B	West First Street / Hawthorne Road	Westbound exit and eastbound entrance
Forsyth	Winston-Salem			234C	Cloverdale Avenue	
Forsyth	Winston-Salem			235	US 158 west (Stratford Road)	West end of US 158 overlap. Signed as Exits 235A (north) and 235B (south) northbound.
Forsyth	Winston-Salem			236	Knollwood Street	
Forsyth	Winston-Salem			237	NC 67 (Silas Creek Parkway) – Wake Forest University, LJVM Coliseum, Forsyth Tech	Signed as Exits 237A (west) and 237B (east). Southbound divided by Collector-Distributor Lane
Forsyth	Winston-Salem	234	377	238	I-40 – Greensboro, Statesville	No access to I-40 west from US 421 south.
Forsyth	Winston-Salem	235	378	239	Jonestown Road / Hanes Mall Boulevard	
Forsyth	Winston-Salem	236	380	240	Peace Haven Road	
Forsyth	Lewisville	238	383	242	Lewisville-Clemmons Road – Lewisville, Clemmons	
Forsyth	Lewisville	240	390	244	Williams Road – Lewisville	
Forsyth		242	389	246	Shallowford Road	
Forsyth	Yadkin		245	394	249	Dinkins Bottoms Road/Baltimore Road
	Yadkin	247	398	251	Speer Bridge Road	
	Yadkin	249	401	253	Shacktown Road/Old Stage Road	
	Yadkin	252	406	256	Unifi Industrial Road	
Yadkinville	Yadkin	253	407	257	US 601 (State Street) – Yadkinville, Mocksville	
	Yadkin	255	410	259	Reavis Road	
Brooks Crossroads	Yadkin	259	417	263	US 21 – Jonesville	
Brooks Crossroads	Yadkin	260	420	264	Asbury Church Road	
	Yadkin	262	422	265	I-77 – Elkin, Statesville, Charlotte	Signed as Exits 265A (North) and 265B (South)
	Yadkin	264	425	267	Windsor Road/Oak Grove Church Road	
Wilkes		267	430	270	Dennyville Road	
Wilkes		269	433	272	To NC 268 (Clingman Road/Somers Road)	
Wilkes		273	439	276	To NC 268 (Red, White, and Blue Road/Mathis Farm Road)	
Wilkes		274	441	277	Windy Gap Road/Speedway Road	
Wilkes		279	449	282	US 421 Bus. / NC 115 (Statesville Road) – North Wilkesboro, Statesville	
Wilkes	Wilkesboro	282	454	285	Brushy Mountain Road – Wilkesboro	
Wilkes	Wilkesboro	283	455	286A	NC 16 south / NC 18 (Cherry Road) – Wilkesboro, Taylorsville, Lenoir	South end of NC 16 overlap
Wilkes	Wilkesboro	283.5	456.2	286B	NC 268 – Wilkesboro	
Wilkes	Wilkesboro	284	457		US 421 Bus. (D Street) – North Wilkesboro	
Wilkes	Wilkesboro	287	462		NC 16 north – Jefferson	North end of NC 16 overlap
Watauga	Deep Gap	304	489		Blue Ridge Parkway	
Watauga	Deep Gap	305	491		US 221 north – West Jefferson	North end of US 221 overlap
Watauga	Boone	313	504		NC 194 north (Jefferson Road) – Todd	North end of NC 194 overlap
Watauga	Boone	314	505		US 221 south / NC 105 south (Highway 105 Extension) – Linville, Banner Elk	South end of US 221 overlap
Watauga	Boone	314.5	506.1		US 321 south (Hardin Street) – Blowing Rock	South end of US 321 overlap
Watauga	Vilas	320	510		NC 194 south – Valle Crucis	South end of NC 194 overlap
Watauga	Sugar Grove	321	517		US 321 north – Elizabethton	North end of US 321 overlap
Watauga		328	528		US 421 north / SR 34 north – Mountain City	Continuation into Tennessee
1.000 mi = 1.609 km; 1.000 km = 0.621 mi: Concurrency terminus; Incomplete access; Unopened

Note – Exit numbers west of Winston-Salem are aligned when US 421 went north around Greensboro in late-1980s/early-1990s. As a result, from realignments in Greensboro, the actual mileage vs. exit number mileage is off by an average of 3.5 miles (5.6 km).

== Alternate names ==
Though the highway is commonly known as "421" throughout the state, the highway does have other known names it uses locally in areas.

- Burnett Boulevard - Road name briefly used in Wilmington, between Carolina Beach Road and 3rd Street.
- Carolina Beach Road - Road name from Seabreeze to Burnett Boulevard in Wilmington.
- Cornelius Harnett Boulevard - Road name from Main Street to Lillington city limit.
- Cumberland Street - Road name within Dunn city limits.
- Delway Highway - Road name between Harrells and Delway in Sampson County.
- Doc and Merle Watson Highway - Official name of highway between the Wilkes/Watauga county line to Boone.
- Don Buie Highway - Name used from US 1 to Cumnock Road in Sanford
- Faircloth Freeway - Road name within Clinton city limits.
- Fort Fisher Boulevard - Road name from Kure Beach to south terminus of US 421.
- Front Street - Road name from main street to Lillington city limit.
- King Street - Road name within Boone city limits.
- Lake Park Boulevard - Road name within Carolina Beach city limits.
- Jackson Boulevard - Road name within Erwin city limits.
- Joseph M. Hunt Jr Expressway - Road name from Randolph/Guilford county line to I-85; expressway continues on into Greensboro, which was an old US 421 alignment.
- Paul Green Memorial Highway - Road Name from Erwin to Lillington.
- Plain View Highway - Road name from US 13 in Spivey's Corner to I-95 near Dunn.
- Main Street - Road name between Cornelius Harnett Boulevard and Front Street in Lillington.
- Northwest Boulevard - Road name from Clinton to Kitty Fork.
- Salem Parkway - Road name through Forsyth County and a small portion of Guilford County between its junctions with Interstate 40.
- Spivey's Corner Highway - Road name from Kitty Fork to US 13 in Spivey's Corner.
- Taylors Bridge Highway - Road name from Delway to Clinton.
- Watson Brame Expressway - Road name throughout Wilkes County.
- Wilmington Highway - Road name from the Sampson/Pender county line to Harrells.

== See also ==
- Special routes of U.S. Route 421
- U.S. Route 21

U.S. Route 421
Previous state: Terminus	North Carolina	Next state: Tennessee
