= U.S. Route 221 in North Carolina =

Segment of American highway

U.S. Highway 221
- US 221 highlighted in red

Route information
- Maintained by NCDOT
- Length: 153.5 mi (247.0 km)
- Existed: 1930–present
- Tourist routes: Little Parkway Scenic Byway

Major junctions
- South end: US 221 at the South Carolina state line near Chesnee, SC
- US 74 near Rutherfordton; US 221A / NC 108 in Rutherfordton; US 64 / US 74A in Rutherfordton; I-40 near Marion; US 70 in Marion; US 321 / NC 105 in Boone; US 421 / NC 105 / NC 194 in Boone; US 21 in Twin Oaks
- North end: US 21 / US 221 at the Virginia state line near Independence, VA

Location
- Country: United States
- State: North Carolina
- Counties: Rutherford, McDowell, Burke, Avery, Caldwell, Watauga, Ashe, Alleghany

Highway system
- United States Numbered Highway System; List; Special; Divided; North Carolina Highway System; Interstate; US; State; Scenic
← US 220	→ NC 222

In the U.S. state of North Carolina U.S. Route 221 (US 221) is a north–south highway that travels through Western North Carolina. From Chesnee, South Carolina to Independence, Virginia, it connects the cities of Rutherfordton, Marion, Boone and Jefferson between the two out-of-state destinations. Its most memorable section, known as the Little Parkway Scenic Byway between Linville and Blowing Rock, offers area visitors a curvier alternative to the Blue Ridge Parkway and access to Grandfather Mountain.

== Route description ==
US 221/NC 226 northbound on the Robert C. Hunter Expressway in Marion

US 221 enters from South Carolina as a rural superstreet highway, with mostly farms, wooded areas, or homes dotting the road. After 10 miles (16 km) it connects with US 74, where US 74 Business begins its overlap towards Rutherfordton as a two lane highway (signs of US 74 Business are scarce throughout). At Rutherfordton, the first major intersection is Charlotte Street, where US 74 Business and US 221A go east. After Rutherfordton, the road reverts to a rural highway, and continues on to Marion.

Before entering Marion city limits, I-40 intersects with US 221. US 221 then joins with NC 226, going west around the city on the Marion Bypass. After the expressway passes the shopping centers along US 70, it continues as a four-lane highway with a turning median all the way to Woodlawn. Along the way, several business can be seen including shrubbery farms, stone/rock cutters, and a chemical plant. NC 226 splits at Woodlawn, for travelers that want to go to Spruce Pine while US 221 continues as a divided highway to Pitts Station Road at North Cove.

The climb to Linville Falls is somewhat curvy. It is a route heavily traveled by trucks, and a runaway truck ramp is located along this section. Also located in this section is Linville Caverns, a small tourist destination. At Linville Falls, nearby sites include Linville Gorge Wilderness, Linville Falls, (via NC 183) and the Blue Ridge Parkway.

View north along US 221 past NC 105 in Linville

Between Linville Falls and Linville, the highway goes through large tracts of fraser fir farms, from the mountain tops to the valleys. At Linville, motorists are recommended to follow NC 105/US 221 Truck to Boone and Blowing Rock, which is faster and flatter. Those that continue on what is known as the Little Parkway Scenic Byway come upon an 18-mile (29 km) segment of numerous curves and elevation changes. The entrance to Grandfather Mountain is located near Linville; also nearby is the Linn Cove Viaduct, via the Blue Ridge Parkway. Those that continue along the scenic route can take a short break at the state rest area. Near Blowing Rock, visitors may also visit the Julian Price Memorial Park and Moses H. Cone Memorial Park, via Blue Ridge Parkway. Blowing Rock and Boone are popular year-round tourist destinations; as such the highway between the two towns offers an array of activities include skiing, shopping, amusement rides, and golf. In Boone, US 221 turns early along NC 105 to King Street, avoiding Appalachian State University and the downtown area; once on King Street (with US 421/NC 194 concurrency), it heads east out of town on a four-lane expressway.

US 221/NC 194 northbound and US 421 southbound in Boone

At Deep Gap, US 221 goes north again on what was formerly a slightly curvy two-lane road to Jefferson. This road has been twinned. As the road nears West Jefferson, the road appears to open up, allowing for more views of the surrounding areas. At West Jefferson and Jefferson, the road serves as a bypass, as well as the last commercialized area along US 221 until Galax, Virginia.

The next 21 miles (34 km) of US 221 is very curvy, similar to the stretch between Linville and Blowing Rock (minus the continuous elevation changes). Between the southern terminus of NC 93 and US 21 in Twin Oaks, US 221 is concurrent with North Carolina Bicycle Route 4. US 221 and US 21 form a concurrency north from Twin Oaks to the Virginia state line.

=== Dedicated and memorial names ===
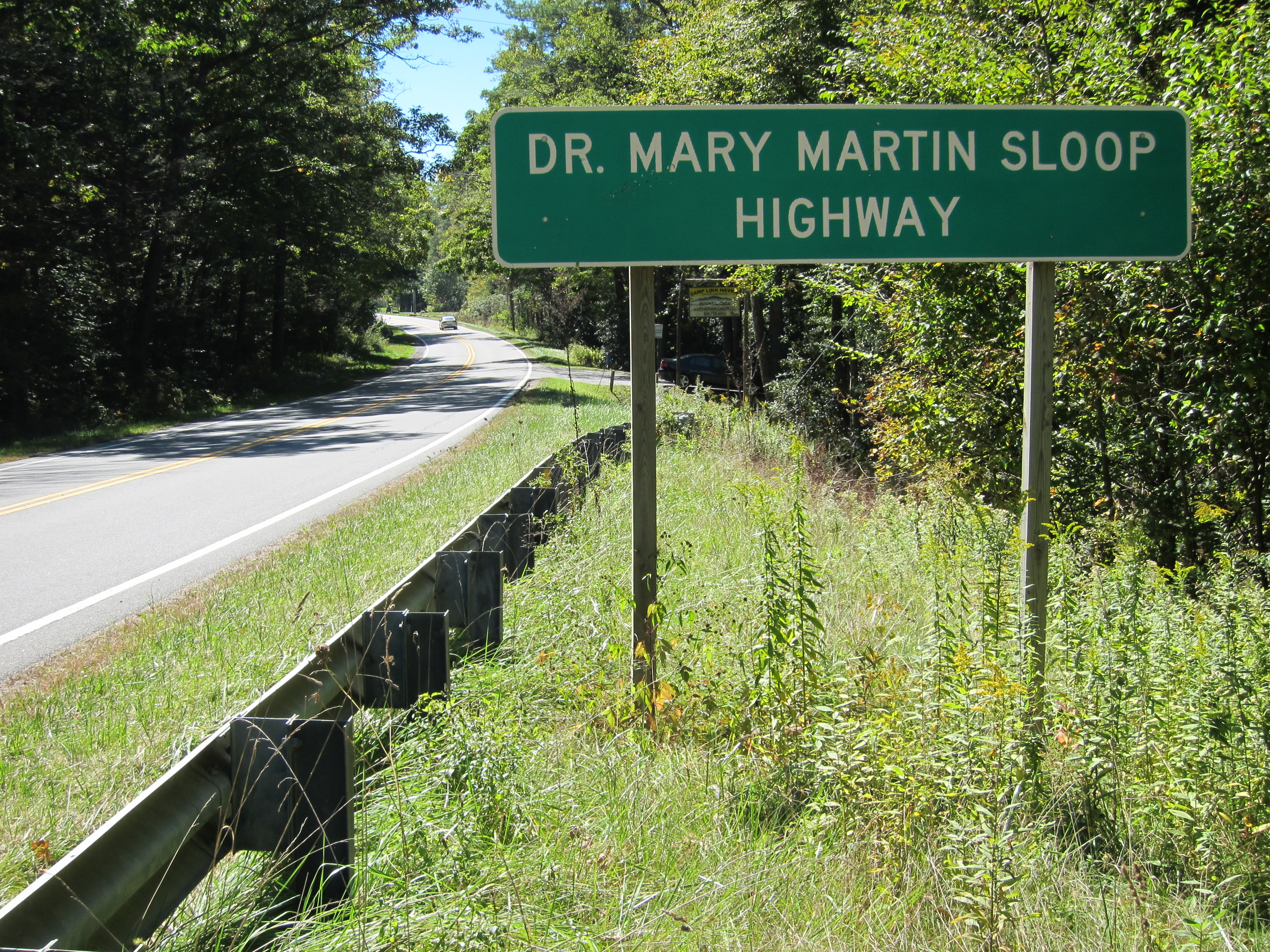
Dr. Mary Martin Sloop Highway

US 221 in North Carolina features a few dedicated or memorialized stretches of highway.

- Dr. Mary Martin Sloop Highway – official North Carolina name of US 221 between Crossnore and Linville. It is named in honor of Dr. Mary Martin Sloop, the founder of the Crossnore School in 1913.
- Robert C. Hunter Expressway – official North Carolina name of the Marion Bypass in McDowell County. It is named in honor of Robert C. Hunter, who was a judge in the North Carolina Court of Appeals (approved on November 3, 1989).
- Robert G. Barr Expressway – official North Carolina name of US 221 between Baldwin and Jefferson, named after a politician from West Jefferson (approved on August 14, 1981).
- Trooper Pete Peterson Bridge – official North Carolina name of bridge that carries US 221 over US 74. It is named in honor of State Trooper Robert L. (Pete) Peterson (approved on January 5, 2001).

== History ==
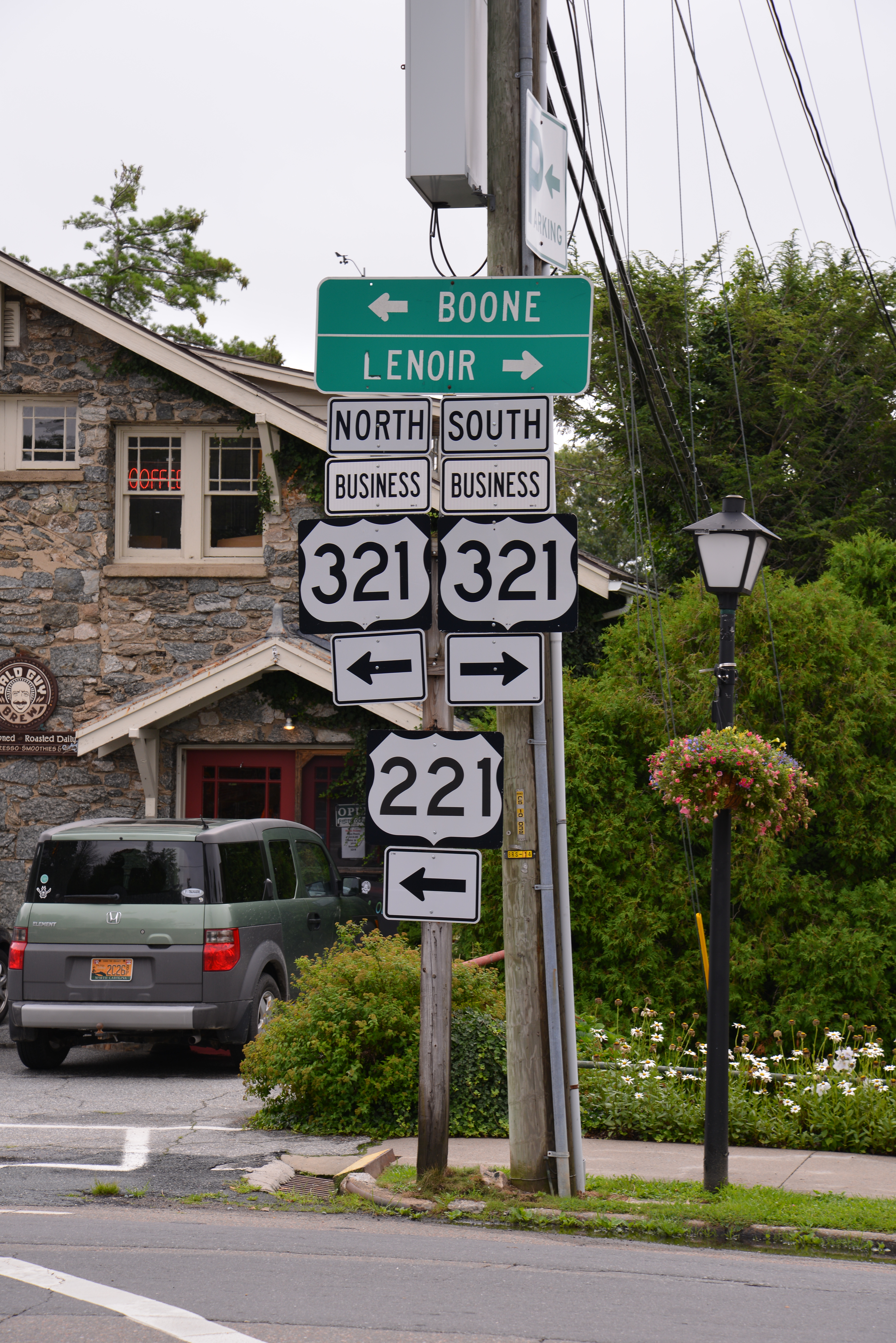
US 221/US 321 Bus. in Blowing Rock

US 221 was established in 1930, from US 19E/NC 69, in Ingalls to US 21/NC 26, in Twin Oaks; it was in complete concurrency with NC 691. In 1931, US 221 was extended north, in concurrency with US 21, into Virginia. In 1932, US 221 was removed from Ingalls/Three Mile area, which remained NC 691, and was placed on new routing south through Woodlawn, Marion, Rutherfordton, Spindale, Forest City and Cliffside, before entering South Carolina. In late 1934, the following concurrences were removed from US 221: NC 19, NC 28 and NC 207. In 1941, US 221 was rerouted south of Rutherfordton on a more direct route to Chesnee; its former alignment through Spindale–Cliffside became US 221A. Around 1953, US 221 was rerouted between Boone and Baldwin, by linking with US 421 to Deep Gap then north on new construction; the old alignment through Todd became an extension of NC 194.

US 221 northbound in unincorporated McDowell County

In 1972, US 221 was rerouted with concurrency with NC 105 to King Street in Boone, ending the US 221/US 321/US 421 intersection at Kings Street and Blowing Rock Road. In 1981, US 221 was placed on new construction between Baldwin and Jefferson, which was two-lane that can be expanded later into a divided four-lane; the old alignment, that went through downtown West Jefferson and Jefferson, became US 221 Business.

In 1991, US 221 was placed on new bypass west of Marion; the old alignment became US 221 Business. The same year, US 221/NC 181 was placed on a new bypass west of Linville; the former alignment became a secondary road. In 1997, US 221/US 421 was placed on new construction between NC 194 to the South Fork New River, in Boone. In 2005, US 221/US 421 was placed on new four-lane expressway between the South Fork New River and Deep Gap; its old alignment, which partially paralleled the Blue Ridge Parkway, was downgraded to secondary roads.

=== North Carolina Highway 19 ===
North Carolina Highway 19
- Location: SC state line–TN state line
- Length: 110.4 mi (177.7 km)
- Existed: 1921–1934

North Carolina Highway 19 (NC 19) was an original state highway that traversed from the South Carolina state line, near Tryon, through Columbus, Rutherfordton, Marion and Spruce Pine, to Bakersville. In 1929, NC 19 was extended to the Tennessee state line, via Ramseytown, replacing part of NC 692. In 1934, NC 19 was decommissioned: South Carolina state line–Tryon to US 176, Tryon–Rutherfordton to NC 181, Rutherford–Woodlawn to US 221, Woodlawn–Ramseytown to NC 26 and Ramseytown–Tennessee state line to US 19W/US 23.

=== North Carolina Highway 741 ===
North Carolina Highway 741
- Location: SC state line–Rutherfordton, NC
- Length: 15.3 mi (24.6 km)
- Existed: 1935–1941

North Carolina Highway 741 (NC 741) existed twice in the state. Its first appeared by 1930 as a new primary routing between NC 151, north of Midland, through Mount Pleasant, to US 601/NC 80, in Gold Hill. In 1933, the highway south of Mount Pleasant was downgraded to secondary roads, while north was partially replaced by NC 62 and secondary roads.

The second NC 741 was established in 1935 as a new primary routing between the South Carolina state line, through Harris, to US 74/US 221/NC 181, in Rutherfordton. In 1941, NC 741 was decommissioned and replaced mostly by US 221, with Jack McKinney Road, between the state line to Harris, as secondary road.

== Future ==
In the Rutherfordton area, NCDOT is constructing an approximately 8.5-mile (13.7 km) four-lane freeway bypass to the east of downtown between US 74 to the south and Roper Loop Road in the north. The project is part of a larger plan by NCDOT to convert US 221 between the South Carolina state line and I-40 near Marion to a four-lane divided highway. The Final Environmental Impact Statement (EIS) was approved on May 26, 2011. NCDOT selected Alternate 3 for the alignment of the highway, designated as "Project R-2233B". Construction on the bypass began on February 28, 2022.

== Junction list ==
County	Location	mi	km	Destinations	Notes
Rutherford		0.0	0.0	US 221 south – Chesnee, Spartanburg	Continuation into South Carolina
Rutherford		10.4	16.7	US 74 / US 74 Bus. begin – Forest City, Columbus, Asheville	West end of US 74 Bus overlap; exit 178 (US 74)
Rutherford	Rutherfordton	15.6	25.1	US 221A south / US 74 Bus. east / NC 108 west (Charlotte Road)	East end of US 74 Bus. overlap
Rutherford	Rutherfordton	16.8	27.0	US 64 / US 74A (Mountain Street) – Lake Lure, Chimney Rock	
McDowell		35.9	57.8	I-40 – Morganton, Asheville	exit 85 (I-40)
McDowell	Marion	37.5	60.4	US 221 Bus. north (Rutherford Road) / NC 226 south – Shelby, Marion	South end of NC 226 overlap
McDowell	Marion	40.0	64.4	Henderson Street – Marion Downtown	
McDowell	Marion	40.7	65.5	Old Highway 10 / Tate Street	To Visitor Center
McDowell	Marion	42.7	68.7	US 70 – Asheville	To Mount Mitchell State Park
McDowell	Marion	43.3	69.7	US 221 Bus. south (North Main Street)	
McDowell	Woodlawn	49.6	79.8	NC 226 north – Little Switzerland, Spruce Pine	North end of NC 226 overlap
Burke	Linville Falls	63.7	102.5	NC 183 east – Morganton	To Linville Gorge Wilderness
Avery	Linville Falls	64.3	103.5	Blue Ridge Parkway	To Linville Falls Visitor Center
Avery		65.6	105.6	NC 194 south (Three Mile Highway) – Spruce Pine	South end of NC 194 overlap
Avery		70.5	113.5	NC 194 north (Millers Gap Highway) – Newland	North end of NC 194 overlap
Avery	Pineola	72.0	115.9	NC 181 south (Beatrice Cobb Highway) – Morganton	South end of NC 181 overlap
Avery	Linville	74.9	120.5	NC 181 north (Newland Highway) – Newland	North end of NC 181 overlap
Avery	Linville	75.5	121.5	NC 105 north – Banner Elk, Boone	
Avery		78.6	126.5	Blue Ridge Parkway	To Linn Cove Viaduct
Caldwell	No major junctions				
Watauga		92.4	148.7	Blue Ridge Parkway	To Julian Price Memorial Park and Moses H. Cone Memorial Park
Watauga	Blowing Rock	94.0	151.3	US 321 Bus. south (Main Street) – Lenoir	South end of US 321 Bus. overlap
Watauga	Blowing Rock	94.8	152.6	US 321 south (Valley Boulevard) / US 321 Bus. end – Lenoir	South end of US 321 and north end of US 321 Bus. overlap
Watauga	Blowing Rock	95.5	153.7	Blue Ridge Parkway	
Watauga	Boone	101.2	162.9	US 321 north (Blowing Rock Road) / NC 105 south – Downtown, Linville, Newland, Banner Elk	North end of US 321 and south end of NC 105 overlap; to ASU
Watauga	Boone	102.0	164.2	US 421 north / NC 194 south (King Street) / NC 105 end	North end of US 421 / NC 105 and south end of NC 194 overlap
Watauga	Boone	102.6	165.1	NC 194 north (Jefferson Road) – Todd	North end of NC 194 overlap
Watauga	Deep Gap	111.6	179.6	US 421 south – Wilkesboro, Winston-Salem	South end of US 421 overlap
Ashe	Baldwin	120.4	193.8	NC 194 south – Todd	South end of NC 194 overlap
Ashe	West Jefferson	124.0	199.6	US 221 Bus. / NC 194 north / NC 163 east – West Jefferson	North end of NC 194 overlap
Ashe	Jefferson	127.5	205.2	US 221 Bus. south / NC 88 west – Jefferson	West end of NC 88 overlap
Ashe		128.4	206.6	NC 16 south / NC 88 east – Wilkesboro	South end of NC 16 and east end of NC 88 overlap
Ashe		129.7	208.7	NC 16 north – Mouth of Wilson	North end of NC 16 overlap
Alleghany		141.5	227.7	NC 113 – North Wilkesboro, Mouth of Wilson	
Alleghany		149.3	240.3	NC 93 west – Piney Creek, Mouth of Wilson	
Alleghany	Twin Oaks	150.2	241.7	US 21 south – Sparta	South end of US 21 overlap
Alleghany		153.5	247.0	US 21 north / US 221 north – Independence	Continuation into Virginia
1.000 mi = 1.609 km; 1.000 km = 0.621 mi: Concurrency terminus

== See also ==
- Special routes of U.S. Route 221

U.S. Route 221
Previous state: South Carolina	North Carolina	Next state: Virginia
