= North Carolina Highway 88 =

State highway in North Carolina, US

North Carolina Highway 88

Route information
- Maintained by NCDOT
- Length: 41.3 mi (66.5 km)
- Existed: 1938–present
- Tourist routes: New River Valley Byway

Major junctions
- West end: SR 67 at the Tennessee state line near Trade, TN
- US 221 in Jefferson
- East end: NC 18 in Laurel Springs

Location
- Country: United States
- State: North Carolina
- Counties: Watauga, Ashe, Alleghany

Highway system
- North Carolina Highway System; Interstate; US; State; Scenic
← NC 87	→ NC 89

North Carolina Highway 88 (NC 88) is a 41.3-mile-long (66.5 km) primary state highway in the U.S. state of North Carolina. Primarily in the High Country, it runs from the Tennessee state line near Trade east to NC 18 in Laurel Springs.

== Route description ==
NC 88 starts at the terminus of Tennessee State Route 67 at the Tennessee state line (at a location called State Line Gap), just 1.6 miles (2.6 km) from U.S. Route 421 (US 421). The road follows the Hoskin Fork through its brief stay in Watauga County into Ashe County where it meets up with the North Fork New River at Sutherland Road. Until Warrensville, the highway is constantly curving along the banks of the Hoskin Fork and North Fork New River, though there is not much elevation change.

From Warrensville, the highway goes southeast through the community of Smethport and into town of Jefferson. Going through the downtown area, it connects with US 221 and then NC 16 east of town. Continuing southeast, it passes the South Fork New River then going east to Laurel Springs in Alleghany County where it ends at a Y-intersection with NC 18 (in front of the U.S. Post Office of Laurel Springs). If travelers continue south on NC 18, for two miles (3.2 km), they will reach the Blue Ridge Parkway. The second half of NC 88, from Jefferson to Laurel Springs, is less curvy compared to the first half and functions as an alternative to US 221 towards Galax, Virginia.

=== Scenic byways ===
The New River Valley Byway is a 32-mile (51 km) byway, split in two sections. NC 88 makes up the second section of the byway (14 miles (23 km)), between Jefferson and Laurel Springs. It is noted for several of the state parks that surround the route and the community of Ore Knob, charted in 1875 and named from the only copper mine that existed in North Carolina. The first section is on NC 194, between Boone and Baldwin.

== History ==
NC 88 was established in 1938 as a new primary route between NC 16 to NC 18 in Laurel Springs. The highway was extended in 1940 replacing NC 16 west of Jefferson to the Tennessee state line. The route has not changed since.

== Major intersections ==
County	Location	mi	km	Destinations	Notes
Watauga		0.0	0.0	SR 67 west – Trade	Tennessee state line
Ashe	Warrensville	20.9	33.6	NC 194 north – Lansing	West end of NC 194 overlap
Ashe	Smethport	24.7	39.8	NC 194 south – West Jefferson	East end of NC 194 overlap
Ashe	Jefferson	26.2	42.2	US 221 Bus. south (South Main Street) – West Jefferson	West end of US 221 Business overlap
Ashe	Jefferson	27.0	43.5	US 221 south / US 221 Bus. ends – West Jefferson	East end of US 221 Business overlap; West end of US 221 overlap
Ashe	Jefferson	28.0	45.1	US 221 north / NC 16 north – Mouth of Wilson	East end of US 221 overlap; West end of NC 16 overlap; to Ashe County Airport
Ashe		31.1	50.1	NC 16 south – Wilkesboro	East end of NC 16 overlap
Alleghany	Laurel Springs	41.2– 41.3	66.3– 66.5	NC 18 – North Wilkesboro, Sparta	
1.000 mi = 1.609 km; 1.000 km = 0.621 mi: Concurrency terminus
