= North Carolina Highway 163 =

State highway in Ashe County, North Carolina, US

North Carolina Highway 163
- NC 163 highlighted in red

Route information
- Maintained by NCDOT
- Length: 9.1 mi (14.6 km)
- Existed: 1961–present

Major junctions
- West end: US 221 / US 221 Bus. / NC 194 in West Jefferson
- East end: NC 16 near Glendale Springs

Location
- Country: United States
- State: North Carolina
- Counties: Ashe

Highway system
- North Carolina Highway System; Interstate; US; State; Scenic
← NC 162	→ NC 168

North Carolina Highway 163 (NC 163) is a primary state highway in the U.S. state of North Carolina. The highway serves as a direct route from West Jefferson towards Wilkesboro.

== Route description ==
NC 163 is a two-lane mountain highway that traverses 9.1 miles (14.6 km) from West Jefferson to NC 16. The highway travels with gliding curves through the valley area, with nearby mountains including Mount Jefferson, Round Knob and Frenches Knob along its edges. A majority of the route parallels Beaver Creek down to its confluence with the South Fork New River. At its eastern terminus, travelers can continue south on NC 16 to the Blue Ridge Parkway, located at Horse Gap (3,128 feet (953 m)), or continue down the mountain towards Wilkesboro.

The North Carolina Department of Transportation (NCDOT) measures average daily traffic volumes along many of the roadways it maintains. In 2016, average daily traffic volumes along NC 163 varied from 2,000 vehicles per day west of the Obids Creek crossing to 5,900 vehicles per day near its western terminus. No section of NC 163 is included with the National Highway System, a network of highways in the United States which serve strategic transportation facilities, nor does it connect to the system.

== History ==
Established in 1961 as a new primary routing along an existing secondary road (SR 1002), from West Jefferson to near Horse Gap; little has changed since.

== Junction list ==
The entire route is in Ashe County.

Location	mi	km	Destinations	Notes
West Jefferson	0.0	0.0	US 221 / US 221 Bus. / NC 194 – West Jefferson, Jefferson, Boone	
	9.1	14.6	NC 16 – Glendale Springs, Jefferson, Wilkesboro	To Blue Ridge Parkway
1.000 mi = 1.609 km; 1.000 km = 0.621 mi
