= North Carolina Highway 105 =

State highway in North Carolina, US

North Carolina Highway 105

Route information
- Maintained by NCDOT
- Length: 17.7 mi (28.5 km)
- Existed: 1956–present

Major junctions
- South end: US 221 in Linville
- NC 184 in Sugar Mountain; US 221 / US 321 in Boone
- North end: US 221 / US 421 / NC 194 in Boone

Location
- Country: United States
- State: North Carolina
- Counties: Avery, Watauga

Highway system
- North Carolina Highway System; Interstate; US; State; Scenic
← NC 104	→ NC 106

North Carolina Highway 105 (NC 105) is a primary state highway in the U.S. state of North Carolina. It traverses from the mountain community of Linville to the town of Boone.

== Route description ==
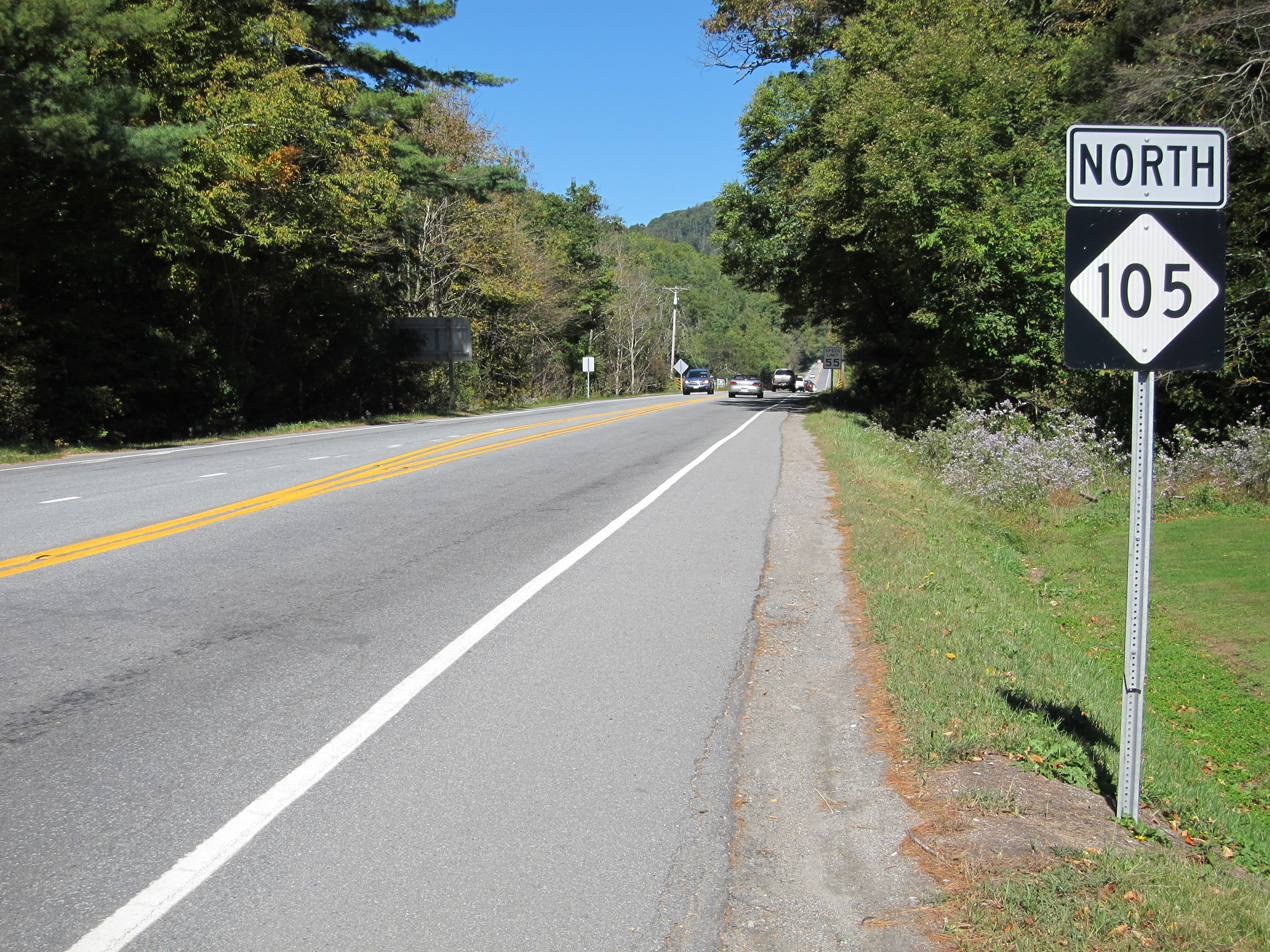
Northbound NC 105, in Linville

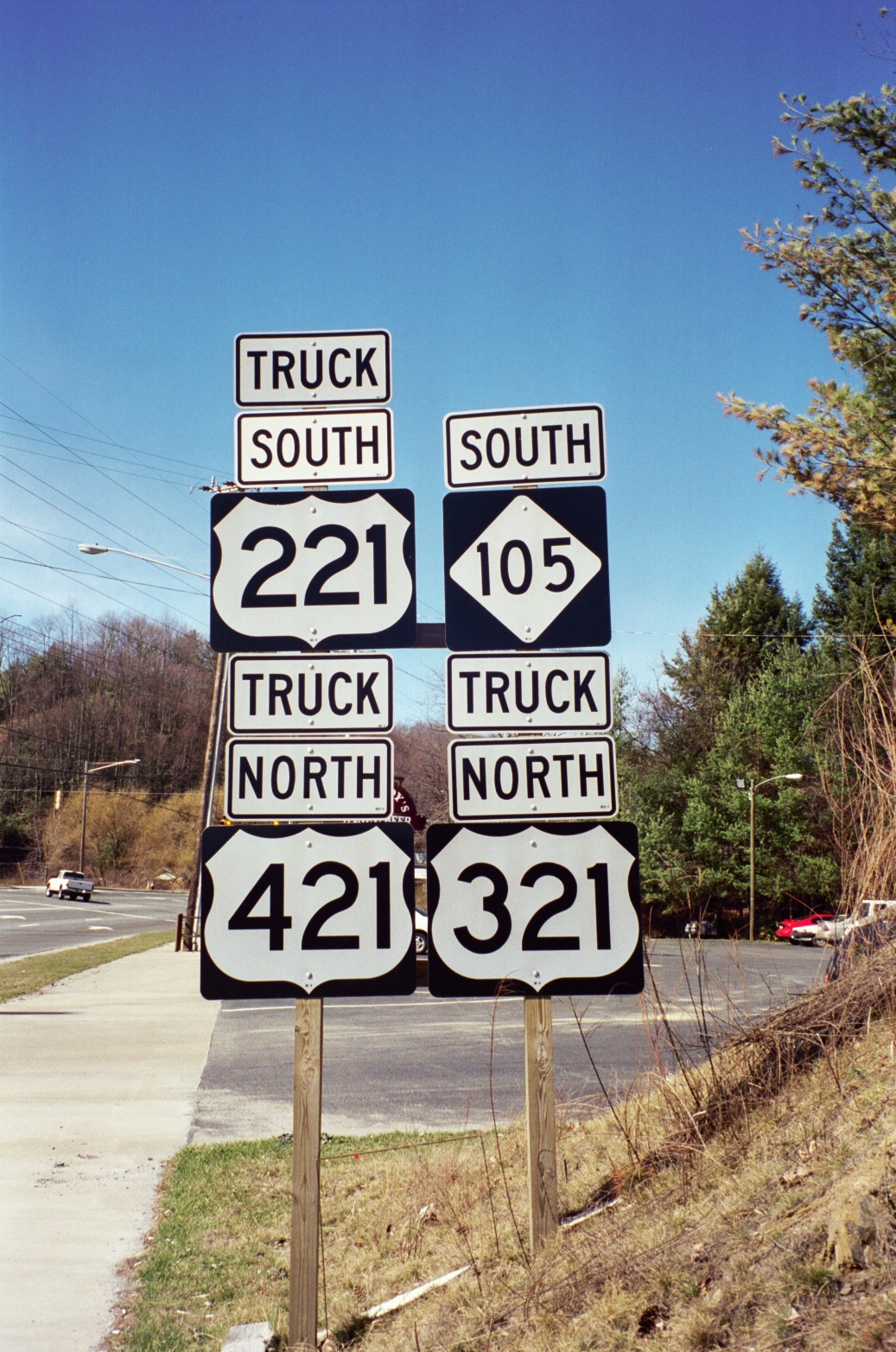
Southbound NC 105 with overlapping US 221, US 321, and US 421 Truck routes, in Boone

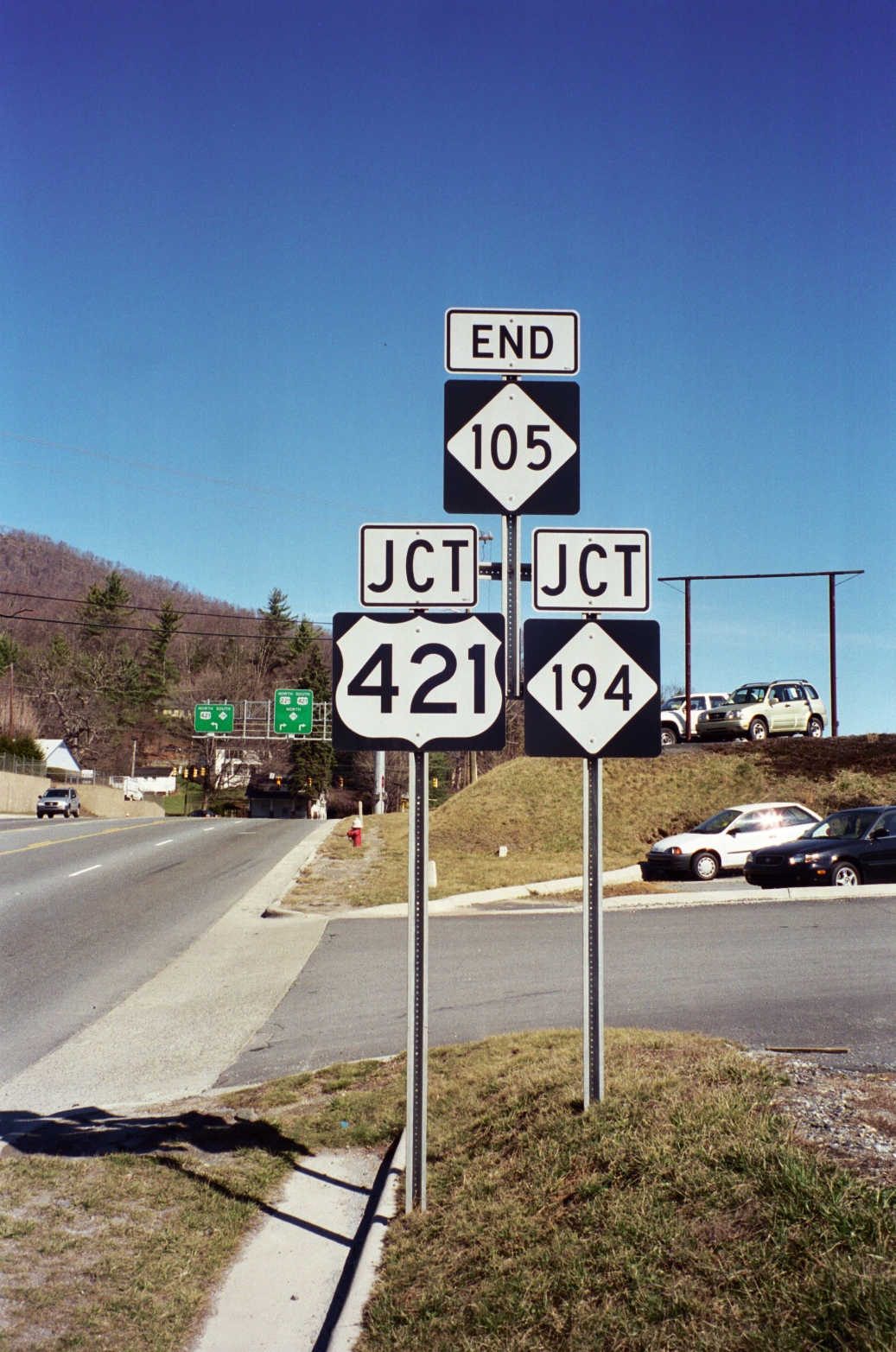
North end of NC 105, in Boone

NC 105 follows the general route of the old East Tennessee and Western North Carolina Railroad (ET&WNC), also known as the "Tweetsie," connecting Linville to Boone before a major flood washed away many sections of the railbed in 1940. For the most part the highway was not built on the actual railbed. Unlike other roads in the area, it was less curvy and made the most direct route to Boone compared to U.S. Route 221 (US 221) and NC 194. The highway also doubles as a truck route for US 221 (south of US 221 in Boone), US 321 and US 421 (both north of NC 105 Bypass in Boone).

The first four miles (6.4 km) of the highway are two-lane and go by the gated communities Grandfather Golf & Country Club and Linville Ridge. At the Tynecastle intersection in Linville Gap, it crosses the Eastern Continental Divide and begins to descend into a valley area. On this section of the highway, the south-bound traffic has a passing lane and trucks are required to drive 45 miles per hour (72 km/h). Once the descent ends, the route briefly passes through the town limits of Seven Devils. Between Seven Devils and Broadstone Road is the unincorporated community of Foscoe. Some of the best views of Grandfather Mountain can be seen at this section of the highway for southbound traffic; it is also notorious for traffic back-ups by travelers trying to stop and visit shops on either side of the road. A brief southbound passing lane is available near Hound Ears. Between Broadstone Road and NC 105 Bypass, the highway ascends towards Boone, and the north-bound traffic expands to two lanes. A rock quarry and asphalt plant are located along the road through here. In Boone, the highway becomes a full four-lane highway for the rest of the route and connects to two major roads: Blowing Rock Road and East King Street.

=== Dedicated and memorial names ===
NC 105 has one dedicated or memorialized stretch of freeway.

- W Ralph Winkler Highway – Official name of highway, from the Avery/Watauga county line to Blowing Rock Road. It is dedicated to Ralph Winkler, who was a member of the State Highway and Public Works Commission in the 1950s.

== History ==
Established in 1956 as a new primary route between Linville and Boone, it converted the ET&WNC "Tweetsie" railroad that had discontinued service since a major flood in 1940.

Prior to 1956, NC 105 was originally assigned as a primary route from Nebo to Linville Falls in 1926. It was then extended in 1929 slightly south to US 70/NC 10. In 1935, the highway was rerouted from Longtown to Morganton; the old route to Nebo was re-branded as NC 105A. In 1940, NC 105 was restored to its original route to Nebo, eliminating NC 105-A; the route from Longtown to Morganton was redesignated as NC 126. Then finally in 1954, it was decommissioned; NC 126 was extended from Longtown to Nebo, while NC 183 extended over a small section in Linville Falls.

The remaining section, known as "Old NC Highway 105 ", has remained unchanged and is not recommended for vehicles without four-wheel drive. The rugged highway with views of the Linville Gorge Wilderness is a part of the Pisgah Loop Scenic Byway.

== Future ==
Identified by local and state officials as a critical highway in the High Country, that is choked by high truck volumes and seasonal tourist traffic, NCDOT plans to widen 4.5 miles (7.2 km) of NC 105 into a divided four-lane highway from Clarks Creek Road east of Foscoe to NC 105 Bypass in Boone.

== Major intersections ==
County	Location	mi	km	Destinations	Notes
Avery	Linville	0.0	0.0	US 221 to NC 181 (Newland Highway) – Blowing Rock, Marion, Newland	To Grandfather Mountain; south end of US 221 Truck concurrency
Avery	Sugar Mountain	4.0	6.4	NC 184 north (Tynecastle Highway) – Banner Elk, Sugar Mountain, Beech Mountain	To Lees-McRae College and ski areas
Watauga	Boone	15.0	24.1	US 321 Truck north / US 421 Truck north (NC 105 Bypass) – Caldwell Community College	South end of US 321 Truck / US 421 Truck concurrencies
Watauga	Boone	17.0	27.4	US 221 south / US 321 (Blowing Rock Road) – Blowing Rock, Lenoir	South end of US 221 overlap; north end of US 221 Truck / US 321 Truck concurrencies; to ASU
Watauga	Boone	17.7	28.5	US 221 north / US 421 / NC 194 (King Street) – Wilkesboro, Todd, West Jefferson	North end of US 221 overlap; north end of US 421 Truck concurrency
1.000 mi = 1.609 km; 1.000 km = 0.621 mi: Concurrency terminus

== Special routes ==
=== Nebo–Longtown alternate spur ===
North Carolina Highway 105A
- Location: Nebo–Longtown, NC
- Length: 7.6 mi (12.2 km)
- Existed: 1935–1940

North Carolina Highway 105A (NC 105A) was established in 1935, when NC 105 was rerouted along the north bank of Lake James and then southwest into Morganton. In 1940, NC 105 reverted to its old alignment with Nebo when NC 126 was established; in 1954, it too became part of NC 126.

=== Unofficial bypass ===
West of Boone, connecting NC 105 and a concurrency of US 421, US 321, and NC 194 is Secondary Road 1107, which has been named locally as "North Carolina Hwy 105 Bypass." Despite this, it is not an official bypass route designated by the NCDOT, and does not reconnect to NC 105, but it does serve as a bypass of downtown Boone. The road also carries US 421 Truck and US 321 Truck.

The road was constructed some time between 1957 and 1962, making its first appearance on official NCDOT maps in 1962, simply as SR 1107. It is not known when the road acquired the unofficial bypass name it has today.
