= North Carolina Highway 184 =

State highway in North Carolina, US

North Carolina Highway 184
- Tynecastle Highway; Beech Mountain Parkway

Route information
- Maintained by NCDOT
- Length: 10.3 mi (16.6 km)
- Existed: 1956–present

Major junctions
- South end: NC 105 in Sugar Mountain
- North end: Pinnacle Ridge Road in Beech Mountain

Location
- Country: United States
- State: North Carolina
- Counties: Avery, Watauga

Highway system
- North Carolina Highway System; Interstate; US; State; Scenic
← NC 183	→ NC 186

North Carolina Highway 184 (NC 184) is a primary state highway in the U.S. state of North Carolina. It runs from NC 105 at Tynecastle (Sugar Mountain) to the town of Beech Mountain.

== Route description ==
View south along NC 184 past NC 194 in Banner Elk

Serving as a spur of NC 105, NC 184 allows easy connection from Boone or Linville to Banner Elk and golf/ski resorts at Sugar and Beech mountains. It is predominantly a two-lane mountain highway with a speed limit no greater than 45 miles per hour (72 km/h). Congestion is common, which peaks in early autumn (fall colors) and winter holidays. The highway crosses the Eastern Continental Divide just north of Tynecastle, but is unmarked.

The final part of the highway, from the stoplight in Banner Elk to the Town Hall on Beech Mountain, served as a major finish in the Tour DuPont Bike Race during the 1990s. Lance Armstrong also made his return to biking after cancer on NC 184 up Beech Mountain.

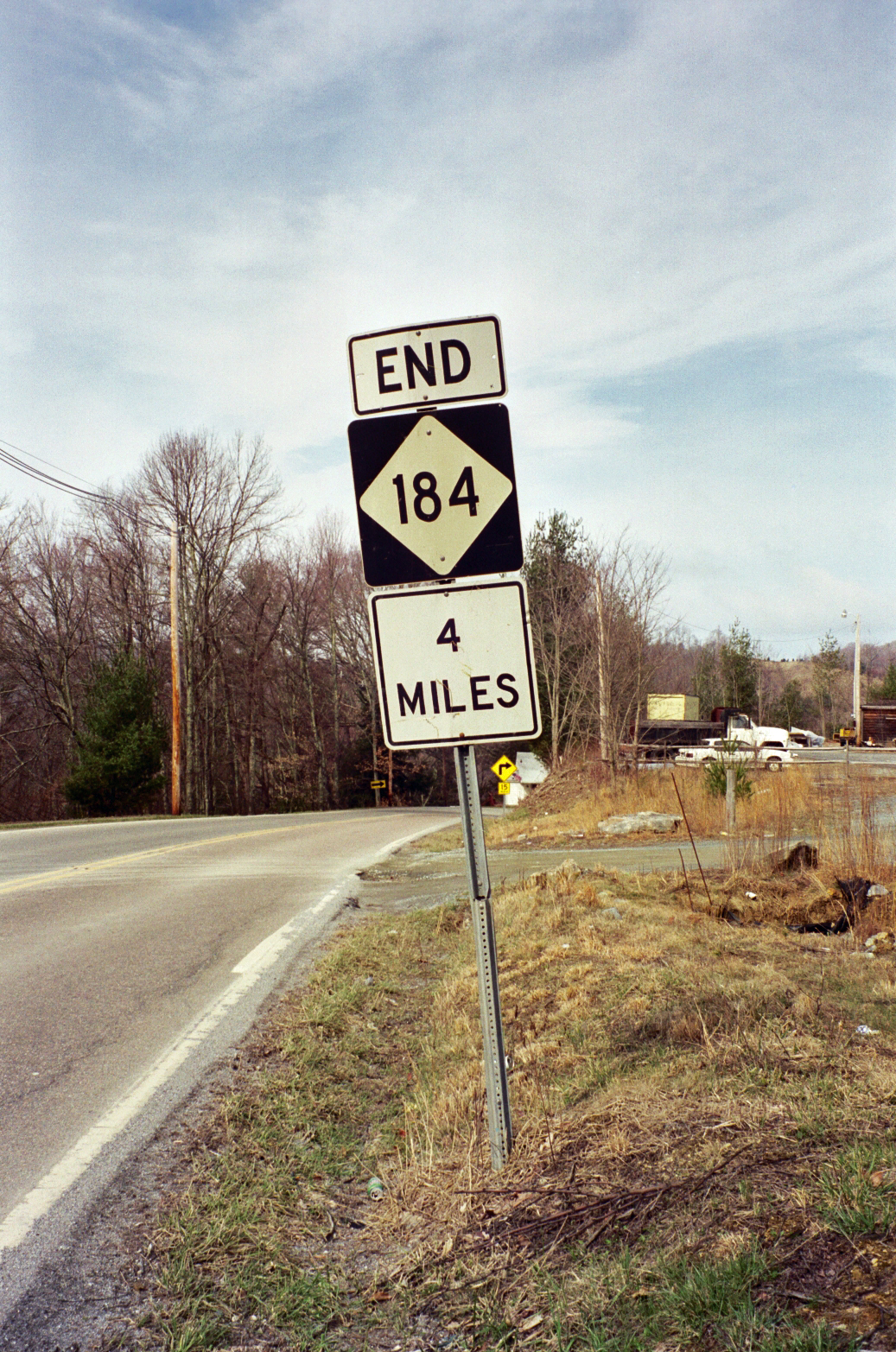
Old NC 184 end sign, in Banner Elk

== History ==
In 1937, NC 184 was originally established as a spur of NC 18 to Boiling Springs. In 1940, it was renumbered as part of NC 150.

The current NC 184 was established in 1956 as a new primary routing, connecting NC 105 to NC 194 in Banner Elk. In 1981, NC 184 was extended through Banner Elk, with brief overlap with NC 194, then continuing along Beech Mountain Parkway to the town of Beech Mountain; ending one mile (1.6 km) after crossing into Watauga County.

== Junction list ==
County	Location	mi	km	Destinations	Notes
Avery	Sugar Mountain	0.0	0.0	NC 105 – Boone, Linville	To Grandfather Mountain
Avery	Banner Elk	4.2	6.8	NC 194 north (Main Street) – Valle Crucis	North end of NC 194 overlap
Avery	Banner Elk	4.6	7.4	NC 194 south (Main Street) – Elk Park	South end of NC 194 overlap
Watauga	Beech Mountain	10.3	16.6	Pinnacle Ridge Road	
1.000 mi = 1.609 km; 1.000 km = 0.621 mi: Concurrency terminus
