= Three Mile, North Carolina =

Three Mile
- Unincorporated community
- Location within the state of North Carolina
- Coordinates: 35°59′06″N 81°58′42″W
- Country: United States
- State: North Carolina
- County: Avery County
- Elevation: 2,890 ft (881 m)
- Time zone: UTC-5 (Eastern (EST))
  - Summer (DST): UTC-4 (EDT)
- ZIP code: 28657
- Area code: 828
- GNIS feature ID: 1023507

Three Mile is an unincorporated community in Avery County, North Carolina, United States. The community is located along NC 194 (Three Mile Highway); the name is derived from the air miles-straight-line distance of three miles between US 19-E to US 221.

It is a rural, unincorporated community, vs. a chartered town and is part of the Green Valley Community and fire district, near the South Toe River.

The community is 4 miles from the Mitchell County line and 5 miles East of the Mitchell County Town of Spruce Pine. Due to better roads and close proximity, the area has historical ties to Spruce Pine, population 2,200, for shopping and eating, vs. to the Avery County Seat town of Newland, which is 11 miles north. Spruce Pine has several large shopping centers, several motels, numerous restaurants, bars, alcohol sales and a regional hospital. The unincorporated community of Linville Falls, 4 miles East, is where Avery, Burke and McDowell Counties converge. Burnsville in Yancey County, is 18 miles west, Asheville is 55 miles Southwest, Boone is 30 miles East and the Johnson City, Tricities TN-VA area is 50 miles north.

The area was massively damaged by flood waters, winds and fallen trees in Tropical Storm Helene on Sept. 27th, 2024 with loss of lives and homes, businesses and roads destroyed, with damages in the area in excess of tens of millions of dollars. Adjacent Avery County areas and Mitchell County were also massively destroyed and the entire region will likely need years to recover.

The area has Avery County's only section of 4-lane highway; a 2-mile section of US 19E, extending from the Gushers Knob Road intersection, to the Toe River bridge at Schoolhouse Mine. The NC DOT has planned that section of highway for expansion to 4 lanes for 3 miles, from the Toe River bridge to connect with the 4-lane, US 19E Highway at the city limits of Spruce Pine. 19E was extended in October 2020 from Spruce Pine, all of the way to Interstate 26 in Madison County, near Mars Hill, making travel to the Asheville area much faster.

There are several major, regional employers nearby: Mayland Community College-Main Campus, Schoolhouse Mine mica and quartz mine owned by Sibelco and 2 large side-by-side NC State Prisons; Mountain View and Avery-Mitchell.

The community area also has several churches, the Avery County Airport (7A8); a public, a regional airport with a paved, 3100 foot runway for general aviation with, several hangars, and aviation fuel, but no tower or rescue crew, Riverside P-5 Elementary School, Green Valley Fire Station, an Avery county park, an Avery County EMS station, a campground, 2 tombstone shops, an automotive garage, a shooting range, along with several small stores and a public landfill.

Three Mile's children residents attend Riverside Elementary School grades P-5, then Avery Middle School in Newland for grades 6-8 and then the adjacent county's sole central high school, Avery County High School, for grades 9-12, along with classes for high school students at Mayland Community College. Avery County School buses provide transportation, as does Avery County transportation.
