= Brooks Crossroads, North Carolina =

- Unincorporated community
- Location of Brooks Crossroads in North Carolina Brooks Crossroads, North Carolina (the United States)
- Coordinates: 36°07′12″N 80°46′23″W
- Country: United States
- State: North Carolina
- County: Yadkin
- Elevation: 1,089 ft (332 m)
- Time zone: UTC-5 (Eastern (EST))
  - Summer (DST): UTC-4 (EDT)
- ZIP code: 27020
- Area code: 336
- FIPS code: 37-37197
- GNIS feature ID: 981978
- Other names: Brooks Cross Roads; Centre Hill

Brooks Crossroads, also called Brooks Cross Roads, is an unincorporated community in Yadkin County, North Carolina, United States on U.S. Highway 421, east of Interstate 77.
