= North Carolina Highway 69 =

State highway in Clay County, North Carolina, US

North Carolina Highway 69

Route information
- Maintained by NCDOT
- Length: 3.876 mi (6.238 km)
- Existed: 1941–present

Major junctions
- South end: SR 17 / SR 515 at the Georgia state line near Hiawassee, GA
- US 64 near Hayesville
- North end: US 64 Bus. in Hayesville

Location
- Country: United States
- State: North Carolina
- Counties: Clay

Highway system
- North Carolina Highway System; Interstate; US; State; Scenic
← NC 68	→ US 70

North Carolina Highway 69 (NC 69) is a 3.876-mile-long (6.238 km) primary state highway in the U.S. state of North Carolina. It runs north–south from the Georgia state line to Hayesville, west of Chatuge Lake.

== Route description ==
NC 69 runs from the Georgia border south of Hayesville and along the western shore of Chatuge Lake. The route crosses U.S. Route 64 (US 64) before entering downtown Hayesville, where it meets its northern terminus at a roundabout with US 64 Bus.

NC 69 is also part of Corridor A, in the Appalachian Development Highway System (ADHS), which is part of Appalachian Regional Commission (ARC).

== History ==
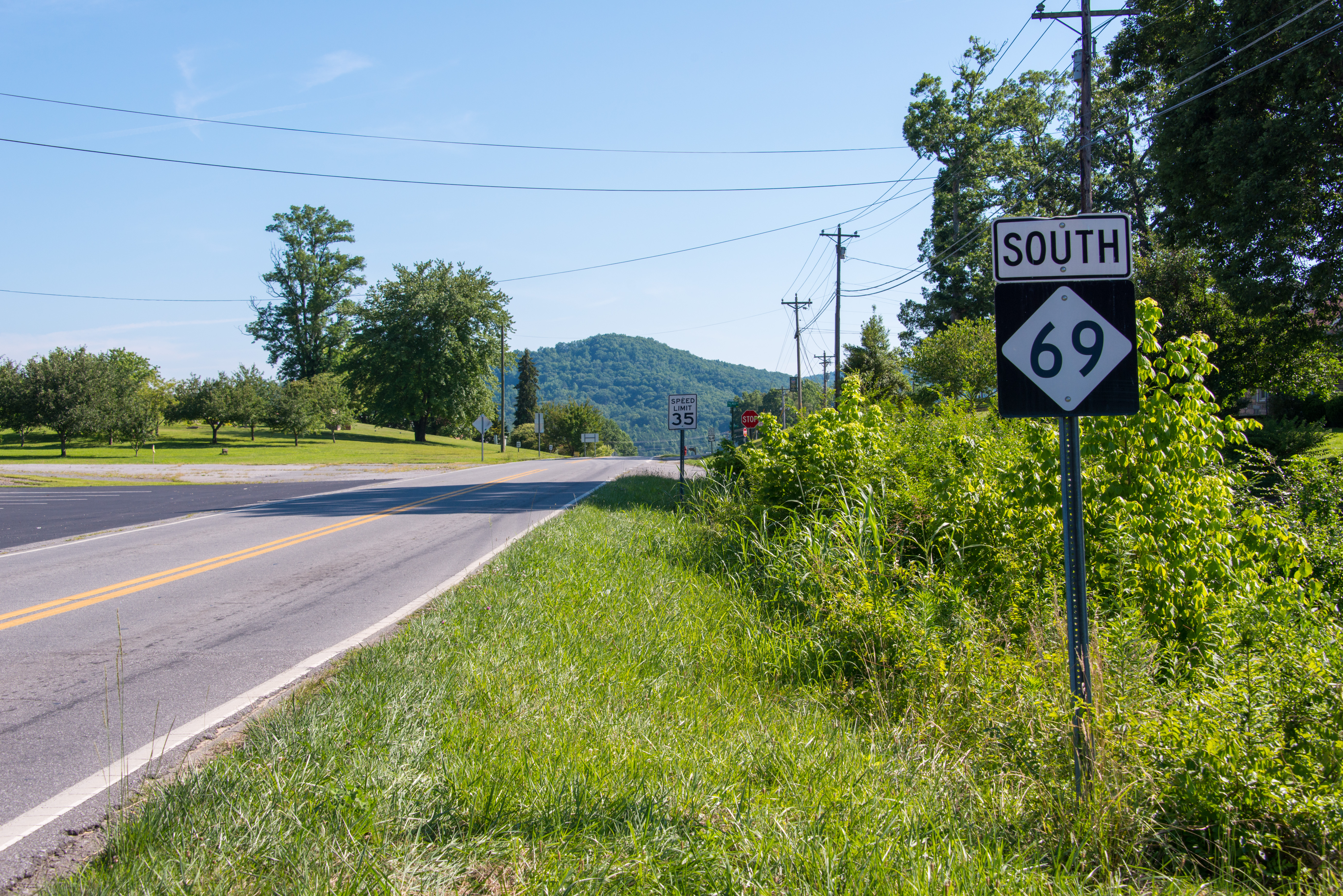
NC 69 in Hayesville

The second and current NC 69 was established in 1941 as a renumbering of NC 287, traversing from Georgia state line, along Myers Chapel Road, to US 64 (Chatuga Dam Road), south of Hayesville. In 1942, NC 69 was rerouted to its current alignment west of its former, most of which now under Chatuge Lake.

The first NC 69 was an original state highway that began at NC 20, in Marshall, to NC 26, in Twin Oaks. Its routing took NC 69 through Burnsville, Spruce Pine, Cranberry, Banner Elk, Boone and West Jefferson. In 1928, NC 69 was extended south to the South Carolina state line, in concurrency with US 25, taking it through Asheville, Arden and Hendersonville; this replaced most of NC 29 and its old routing to Marshall became NC 213. In 1930, NC 69 was rerouted at Cranberry towards Elk Park and the Tennessee state line, in concurrency with US 19E; its old alignment north was broken up with NC 194 between Cranberry and Villas, NC 60 between Villas and Boone, and NC 691 between Boone Twin Oaks. In 1932, NC 69 was placed on new routing between Arden and Asheville, its old alignment became NC 69A, though remained part of US 25. In 1934, NC 69 was decommissioned in favor of US 25, US 19 and US 19E.

Between 1930 and 1960, NC 69 was a usually part of a multi-state route 69 that travels through Georgia and North Carolina. During those times, NC 69 continues as Georgia State Route 69 (SR 69) after crossing the Georgia border and entering Towns County few miles before the route meets its southern terminus at US 76/SR 2 northwest of Hiawassee. In 1955, SR 17 north of US 76/SR 2 was shifted to the west to travel concurrently with SR 69. Between 1957 and 1960, SR 69 was decommissioned, while SR 17 stayed on this segment of highway right before SR 515 was signed and existed.

=== North Carolina Highway 287 ===
North Carolina Highway 287
- Location: GA State Line–Hayesville
- Existed: 1923–1941

North Carolina Highway 287 (NC 287) was established in 1923 as a renumbering of part of NC 109. It traversed from the Georgia state line (along Myers Chapel Road) to NC 28 (Chatuga Dam Road), near Hayesville. In 1941, NC 287 was renumbered to NC 69.

== Future ==
NCDOT plans to upgrade NC 69 into a divided four-lane expressway from the Georgia state line to US 64; which would complete a gap in Corridor A. In November 2019, NCDOT awarded a $46.3 million contract to Wright Brothers Construction for the expansion of NC 69. Widening is expected to be finished by March 2024.

== Major intersections ==
The entire route is in Clay County.

Location	mi	km	Destinations	Notes
	0.00	0.00	SR 17 south / SR 515 south – Hiawassee	Georgia state line
Hayesville	3.53	5.68	US 64 – Murphy, Franklin	
Hayesville	3.85	6.20	US 64 Bus. – Hayesville	Roundabout
1.000 mi = 1.609 km; 1.000 km = 0.621 mi

== Special routes ==
=== Arden–Asheville alternate route ===
North Carolina Highway 69A
- Location: Arden–Asheville
- Existed: 1932–1934

North Carolina Highway 69 Alternate (NC 69A) was a renumbering of NC 69 between Arden and Asheville, connecting the communities of Skyland and Biltmore; it was in complete concurrency with US 25. In 1934, NC 69A was decommissioned in favor of US 25.

== See also ==
- North Carolina Highway 175, which runs along the opposite side of Chatuge Lake
