= Thruway Center =

Shopping center in North Carolina

Coordinates: 36°5′32″N 80°16′58″W

Thruway Center is the oldest shopping center in Winston-Salem, North Carolina and the second shopping center in North Carolina.

== Inception ==
Winston-Salem's first shopping center was described as "comparable to Raleigh's Cameron Village". Merchants Development Co., started by Ray Messick, Earl Slick and W.B. Leverton, announced plans for a 14-acre site which was once a farm on Stratford Road in June 1953. The development was named Thruway because it was near a planned east-west superhighway expected to be named the Thruway. The $1.5 million center would include a 16,400-square-foot Food Fair grocery store, part of a chain owned by Messick. It was also have a 14,000-square-foot F.W. Woolworth, a 9000-square-foot Eckerd Drug, a laundromat, a bakery, a toy store, a children's store, a barber, a beauty salon, a gift shop, a shoe store, a ladies' wear store, and a bank. A 2-story building next door was called the Smoke House. It housed WTOB radio, which had to move its landmark tower for the development. Mayor Marshall Kurfees cut the ribbon October 13, 1955. While the expressway was not called the Thruway, the center's name remained. A $2.5 million addition in 1966 on Knollwood Street increased the size to 304,778 square feet on a site totalling 30 acres. Included was a 20,000-square-foot Thalhimers, a Roses and a 15,750-square-foot Winn-Dixie. B.F. Saul Real Estate Investment Trust of Chevy Chase, Maryland purchased the center in 1972 and spent $1 million on improvements in 1975.

== Development ==
Thalhimers closed in January 1992. Stein Mart announced plans on March 16 to take over the space. Also in 1992, Harris Teeter opened its third location in the city, and its largest.

Roses announced in November 1993 that it would close 40 stores including the Thruway location, which at 22,000 square feet was its smallest of six locations in Forsyth County. Two other Winston-Salem stores would remain open.

Borders announced plans to move into the former Woolworth's space in 1998. The bookstore chain's 25,000-square-foot fifth store in North Carolina opened in May 1999. The store closed in 2011 after the chain announced it would liquidate.

Trader Joe's opened a 13,000-square-foot location, its first in Winston-Salem, in October 2012 in the former Borders space.

As of 2019, Dewey's Bakery was the last remaining original tenant. That same year, a time capsule was opened which had been buried at the time of the opening of Thruway Theatre February 14, 1969. A new one was buried, to be opened in 2069.

Stein Mart closed numerous stores including the Thruway location in 2020. O2 Fitness Clubs moved into the Stein Mart space in September 2023. Sephora announced in May 2022 that it would be Thruway's second anchor tenant, with 7000 square feet next to Trader Joe's.
