= Ingalls, North Carolina =

Ingalls
- Unincorporated community
- Location within the state of North Carolina
- Coordinates: 35°58′17″N 82°00′42″W
- Country: United States
- State: North Carolina
- County: Avery County
- Named for: John James Ingalls
- Elevation: 2,766 ft (843 m)
- Time zone: UTC-5 (Eastern (EST))
  - Summer (DST): UTC-4 (EDT)
- ZIP code: 28657
- Area code: 828
- GNIS feature ID: 1012354

Ingalls is an unincorporated community in Avery County, North Carolina, United States. The community is located at the intersection of US 19-E and NC 194. The Avery County Airport (Morrison Field) is located two miles south from Ingalls, towards Spruce Pine.

== See also ==
- North Toe River
- Unaka Range
