= Vilas, North Carolina =

- Unincorporated community
- Location within North Carolina Location within the United States
- Coordinates: 36°14′44″N 81°46′03″W
- Country: United States
- State: North Carolina
- County: Watauga
- Named for: Vallis (Latin)
- Elevation: 2,746 ft (837 m)
- Time zone: UTC-5 (Eastern (EST))
  - Summer (DST): UTC-4 (EDT)
- ZIP code: 28692
- Area code: 828
- GNIS feature ID: 1023082

Vilas is an unincorporated community in Watauga County, North Carolina, United States. The community is located at Linville Creek, along U.S. Route 321 and U.S. Route 421, 5.6 miles (9.0 km) west-northwest of Boone. The Vilas post office, with ZIP code 28692, was established in 1885.

== Notable residents ==
- Joseph Bathanti (born 1953), an American poet, novelist and professor
