= North Carolina Highway 194 =

State highway in North Carolina, US

North Carolina Highway 194

Route information
- Maintained by NCDOT
- Length: 85.5 mi (137.6 km)
- Existed: 1921–present
- Tourist routes: Big Horse Creek Byway; Mission Crossing Byway; New River Valley Byway

Major junctions
- South end: US 19E in Ingalls
- US 221 near Linville Falls; US 321 / US 421 in Vilas; US 221 / NC 105 in Boone; US 221 in Baldwin
- North end: Rugby Road at the Virginia state line near Helton

Location
- Country: United States
- State: North Carolina
- Counties: Avery, Watauga, Ashe

Highway system
- North Carolina Highway System; Interstate; US; State; Scenic
← NC 191	→ NC 197

North Carolina Highway 194 (NC 194) is a primary state highway in the U.S. state of North Carolina. Entirely in the High Country, it runs from US 19E, in Ingalls, to the Virginia state line, near Helton.

== Route description ==
The nature of NC 194 is one of a route that primarily serves local traffic. NC 194 may be thought of as a collection of individual routings under one number, as each segment serves its own local traffic and local needs—it is quicker to use other routes to get to another segment of NC 194 than to use NC 194 itself. It does not take the most direct route possible due to its endpoints and destinations, but instead meanders through the mountains, serving predominantly rural communities in the High Country to provide access to outside communities. Because of this, it is not a route that is typically traveled for its entire length, or any significant part of its length.

=== Ingalls to Elk Park ===
NC 194 begins heading due east in the community of Ingalls, on a moderately curvy stretch of road known as Three Mile Highway, eventually meeting its first of many junctions with US 221. On its first of three concurrences with US 221, the routes go through the town of Crossnore, then separate after leaving the area. NC 194 then heads north towards Elk Park, passing through Newland—this is a relatively straight stretch of road. A passing lane; one of few on NC 194 due to its mountainous nature, is available for southbound travelers between Newland and Elk Park.

=== Elk Park to Vilas ===
View north along NC 194 past NC 184 in Banner Elk

Between Elk Park and Vilas, the route becomes much more curvy, hugging the banks of several local waterways—The Elk River, between Elk Park and Banner Elk, the Craborchard Creek from the Watauga–Avery County line to Valle Crucis, and the Watauga River in Valle Crucis. In Banner Elk, drivers are met with numerous pedestrian crossings. The road provides access to the Elk River Airport, Lees–McRae College, and provides access via NC 184 to the ski resorts on Beech and Sugar Mountain.

=== Vilas to West Jefferson ===
NC 194/US 221 northbound and US 421 southbound in Boone

From Vilas through Boone, it is triplexed with US 421 and US 321, passing through Downtown Boone. US 321 exits this triplex, leaving on Blowing Rock Road. It becomes a duplex with US 421 until NC 105, where it becomes briefly triplexed with US 221 as once more, between NC 105 and Jefferson Road. Here, it exits the concurrencies. Heading north, it travels through the unincorporated community of Sands, and provides access to Meat Camp. After passing through Sands, the route becomes narrow and curvy again, serving the community of Todd as a North Carolina Scenic Byway.

Reconnecting with US 221 in Baldwin, the road widens, and is briefly a divided highway. In West Jefferson, the road splits from US 221 for the final time. NC 194 goes through downtown West Jefferson, concurrent with US 221 Business before the latter route splits at West Second Street.

=== West Jefferson to the Virginia state line ===
From West Jefferson, NC 194 continues heading north, duplexing with NC 88, starting in Smethport and continuing until Warrensville. NC 194 from this point will not meet another route for its last 13.4 miles (21.6 km) to the Virginia state line. On its trek there, it passes through several unincorporated communities: Bina, Lansing, Brandon, Sturgills, and Helton. Reaching the Virginia line, it becomes a narrow, unmarked secondary road, numbered as SR 743 and named Rugby Road, which eventually connects to US 58.

The highway is the northernmost primary route in the state.

=== Scenic byways ===
NC 194 is part of two scenic byway in the state (indicated by a Scenic Byways sign). Both routes are not recommended for recreational vehicles or buses.

Mission Crossing Byway is an 18 miles (29 km) byway from Elk Park to Vilas, passing through the town of Banner Elk and the communities of Heaton, Balm, and Valle Crucis. The route gets its name from the 1895 mission built in Valle Crucis by the Episcopal Church, today it is used as a camp and conference center. The route is also noted for its back-road feel, a farm built in 1812, and the Mast General Store. The Valle Crucis, Shawneehaw and Elk Park Turnpike was built as a toll road between 1891 and 1892, by hand labor and without machinery. A particular four mile section is noted for its curves from the Valle Crucis Elementary School to Banner Elk, and for its scenic beauty. Today, the roadbed is part of North Carolina Highway 194.

New River Valley Byway is an 32 miles (51 km) byway, split in two sections. The first section (18 miles (29 km)) is traversed by NC 194 from Boone to Baldwin, passing through the community of Todd. The section is noted for its Christmas tree farms, the North Fork New River, a site of a Revolutionary War engagement, and the Todd General Store. The second section is on NC 88, between Jefferson and Laurel Springs.

== History ==
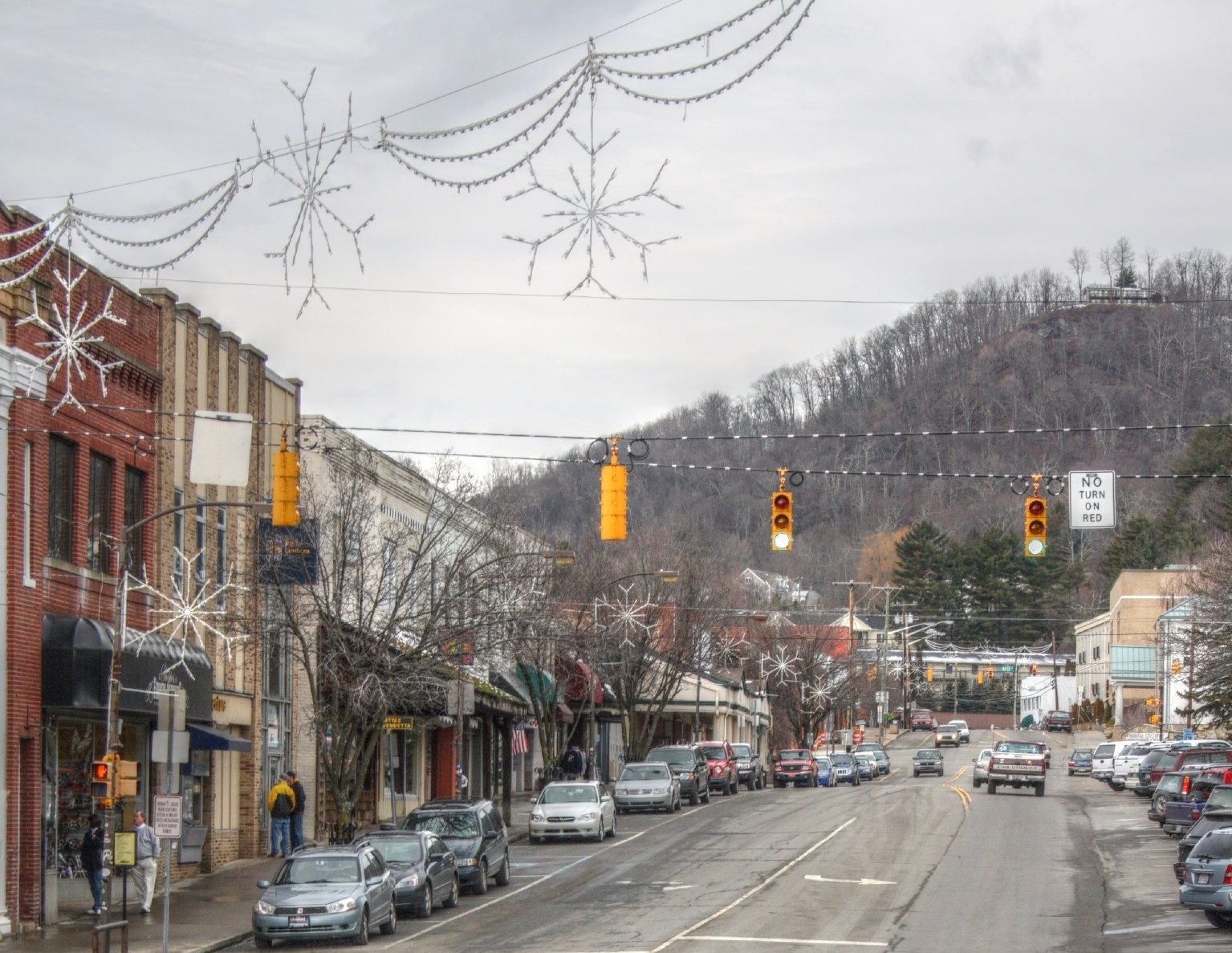
Boone's King Street (US 321/US 421/NC 194)

NC 194 is an original state highway that traveled between NC 19, in Woodlawn, and NC 69, in Minneapolis; connecting Altamont and Newland along its routing. In 1923, NC 194 was rerouted north from Newland to NC 69, in Cranberry; its old alignment, which paralleled the ETWN "Tweetsie" Railroad, became Old Toe River Road (SR 1157). In 1924, NC 194 was extended to the Tennessee state line, replacing NC 694. In 1930, NC 194 replaced NC 69 north of Elk Park to US 321/NC 60, in Vilas; its former routing to Tennessee became part of NC 69.

In 1932, NC 194 was replaced by US 221/NC 28, between Woodlawn and Crossnore. The following year, NC 194 was re-extended south along US 221/NC 28, through Crossnore and Altamont, then replaced NC 691 to its current southern terminus in Ingalls.

Around 1953, NC 194 was extended from Vilas, along US 421 through Boone, then north replacing an old alignment of US 221 through Todd to Baldwin. Overlapping with US 221 to West Jefferson, it then replaces NC 162 through Warrensville to its current northern terminus at the Virginia state line.

Between 1963 and 1968, NC 194 was realigned onto new road between Newland and Elk Park, leaving behind Blevins Creek Road (SR 1361). In 1981, US 221/NC 194 was placed on road between Baldwin and West Jefferson, leaving behind Beaver Creek School Road (SR 1248).

=== North Carolina Highway 691 ===
North Carolina Highway 691
- Location: Ingalls–Linville Falls, NC
- Length: 4.2 mi (6.8 km)
- Existed: 1925–1933

North Carolina Highway 691 (NC 691) was established in 1925 as a new primary routing between NC 69, in Ingalls, to NC 194, near Linville Falls. In 1926, NC 691 was truncated further north from Linville Falls, at the east end of Three Mile Highway; the old alignment replaced by NC 194. In 1930, NC 691 was extended north, with a concurrency with US 221, to Twin Oaks; its new alignment replaced part of NC 194 to Crossnore, NC 181 to Pineola, NC 176 to Linville, NC 175 to Blowing Rock and NC 69 between Boone to Twin Oaks. In 1932, NC 691 was reverted to its pre-1930 alignment, with NC 28 replacing it with its former concurrency with US 221. In 1933, NC 691 was decommission with the extension of NC 194 to Ingalls.

== Junction list ==
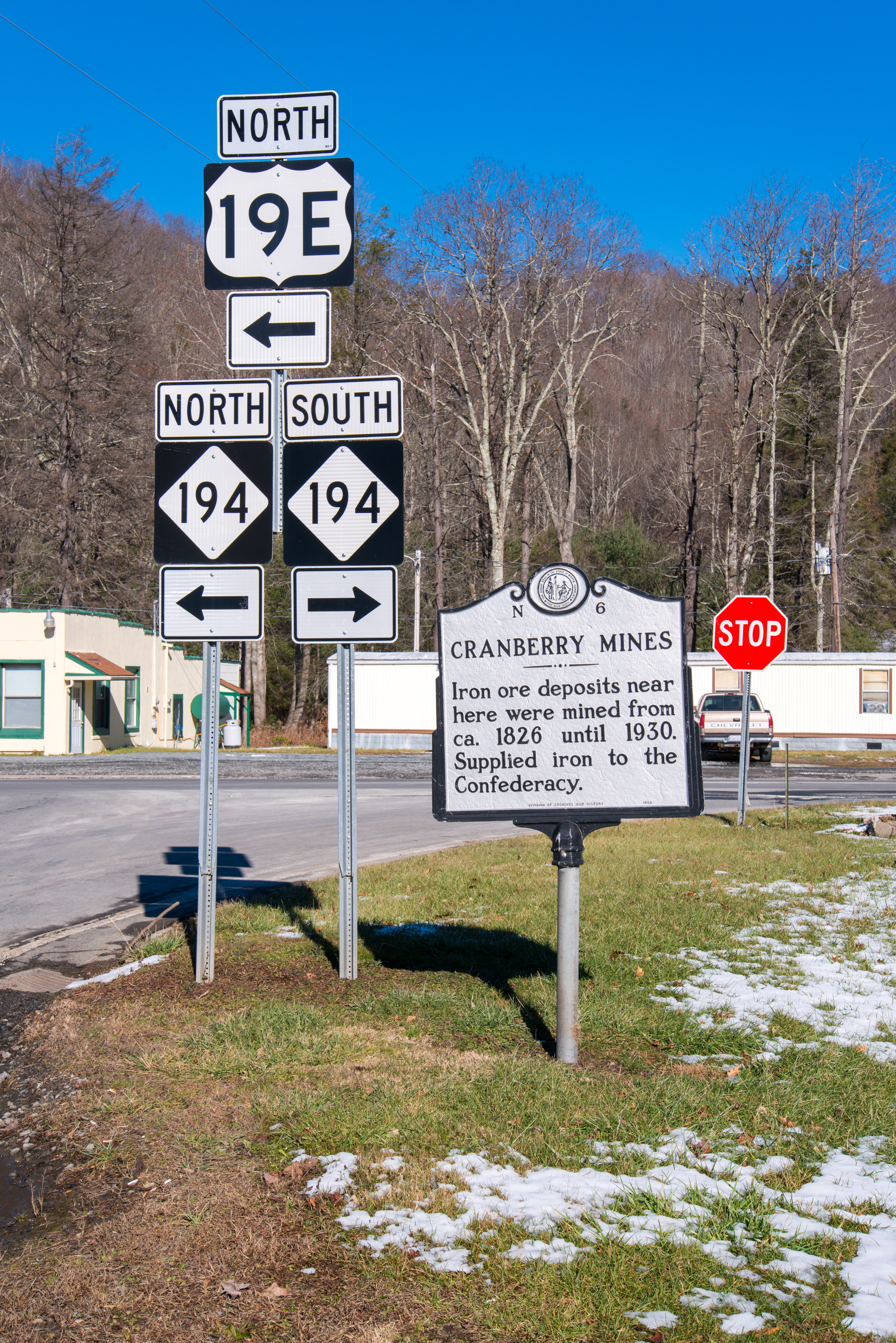
US 19E/NC 194 in Cranberry

County	Location	mi	km	Destinations	Notes
Avery	Ingalls	0.0	0.0	US 19E – Spruce Pine, Cranberry	
Avery		4.2	6.8	US 221 south (Linville Falls Highway) – Marion	South end of US 221 overlap
Avery	Crossnore	9.1	14.6	US 221 north (Linville Falls Highway) – Linville, Morganton	North end of US 221 overlap
Avery	Newland	13.0	20.9	NC 181 south (Linville Avenue) – Linville	
Avery	Cranberry	18.6	29.9	US 19E south – Spruce Pine	South end of US 19E overlap
Avery	Elk Park	18.9	30.4	US 19E north – Roan Mountain	North end of US 19E overlap
Avery	Banner Elk	25.5	41.0	NC 184 north (Beech Mountain Parkway) – Beech Mountain	North end of NC 184 overlap; to Ski Beech
Avery	Banner Elk	25.8	41.5	NC 184 south (Shawneehaw Avenue) – Linville, Boone	South end of NC 184 overlap; to Ski Sugar
Watauga	Valle Crucis	33.3	53.6	To NC 105 / Broadstone Road	
Watauga	Vilas	37.0	59.5	US 321 / US 421 north – Mountain City	North end of US 321/US 421 overlap
Watauga	Boone	42.7	68.7	US 321 south (Hardin Street) – Blowing Rock	South end of US 321 overlap
Watauga	Boone	43.0	69.2	US 221 / NC 105 south (Highway 105 Extension) – Linville, Banner Elk	South end of US 221 overlap
Watauga	Boone	43.6	70.2	US 221 north / US 421 south – Wilkesboro, Winston-Salem	North end of US 221 and south end of US 421 overlap
Ashe	Baldwin	61.7	99.3	US 221 south	South end of US 221 overlap
Ashe	West Jefferson	65.3	105.1	US 221 north / NC 163 – Jefferson	North end of US 221 and south end of US 221 Bus. overlap
Ashe	West Jefferson	67.0	107.8	US 221 Bus. north – Jefferson	North end of US 221 Bus. overlap
Ashe	Smethport	68.5	110.2	NC 88 east – Jefferson	East end of NC 88 overlap
Ashe	Warrensville	72.3	116.4	NC 88 west – Trade	West end of NC 88 overlap
Ashe	Helton Township	85.5	137.6	Rugby Road	Continuation beyond Virginia state line
1.000 mi = 1.609 km; 1.000 km = 0.621 mi: Concurrency terminus

== Special routes ==
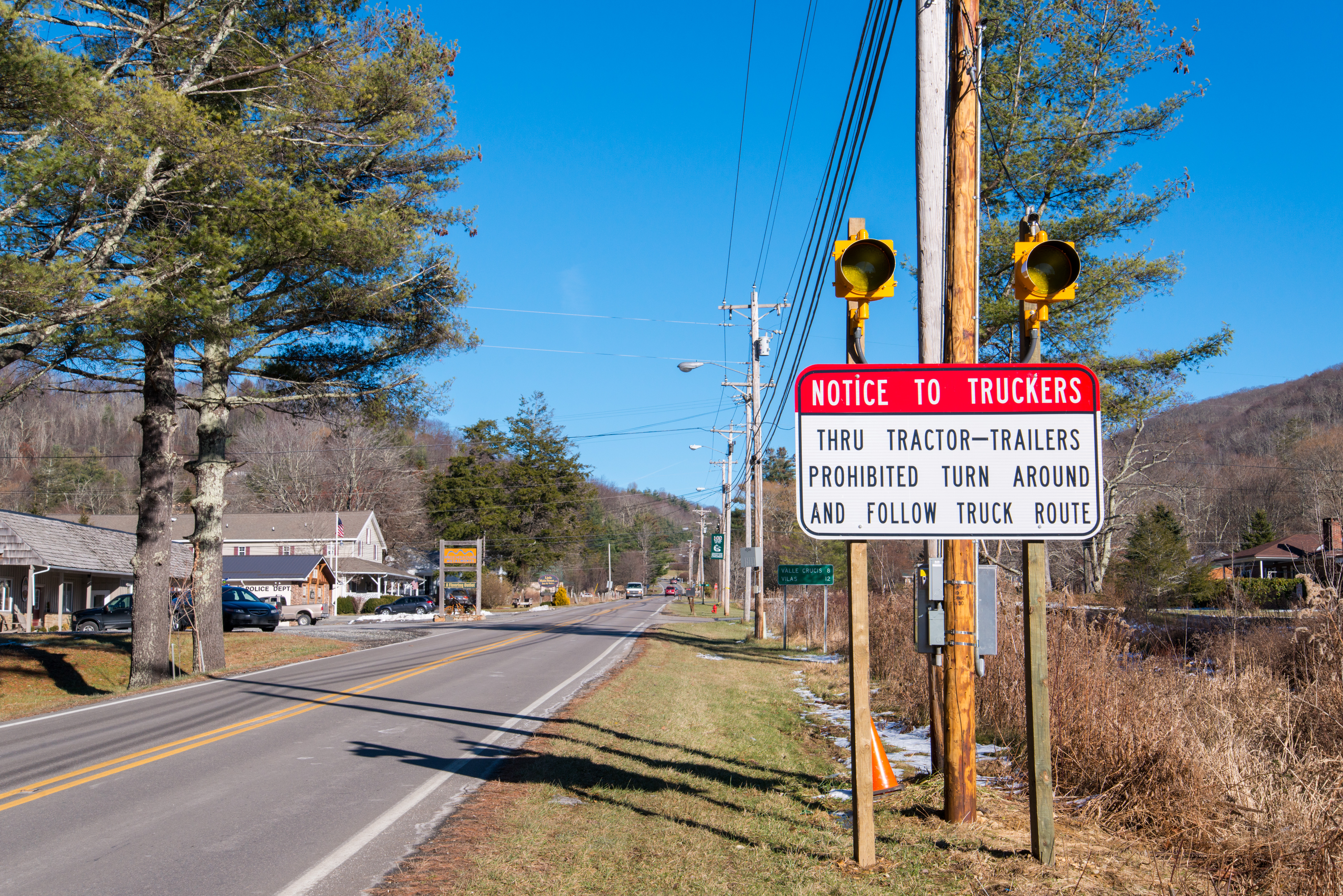
One of several warning signs for truckers along this stretch of NC 194

=== Banner Elk–Valle Crucis truck route ===
North Carolina Highway 194 Truck
- Location: Banner Elk-Valle Crucis, NC
- Length: 15.2 mi (24.5 km)

North Carolina Highway 194 Truck (NC 194 Truck) redirects truckers traveling through either Banner Elk or Valle Crucis to not use the mainline highway between the two locations, with explicate flashing warning signs. This 15.2-mile (24.5 km) detour takes truckers, from Banner Elk, south along NC 184 to Tynecastle (a.k.a. Invershield or Linville Gap), then north along NC 105 to Broadstone Road (SR-1112); hugging the Watauga River, it eventually reconnects with mainline NC 194 in Valle Crucis.
