= Twin Oaks, North Carolina =

Twin Oaks
- Unincorporated community
- Location within the state of North Carolina
- Coordinates: 36°31′39″N 81°09′47″W
- Country: United States
- State: North Carolina
- County: Alleghany County
- Elevation: 2,740 ft (835 m)
- Time zone: UTC-5 (Eastern (EST))
  - Summer (DST): UTC-4 (EDT)
- ZIP code: 28675
- Area code: 336
- GNIS feature ID: 996387

Twin Oaks is an unincorporated community in Alleghany County, North Carolina, United States. The community is located at the intersection of US 21 and US 221, 3 miles (4.8 km) northwest of Sparta. Twin Oaks obtained its name from a pair of large oak trees that stood near where the abandoned Twin Oaks Drive-In Theater now stands.
