= Foscoe, North Carolina =

- Unincorporated community census-designated place
- Location within the state of North Carolina
- Coordinates: 36°09′13″N 81°46′25″W
- Country: United States
- State: North Carolina
- County: Watauga County

Area
  - Total: 5.79 sq mi (15.00 km^{2})
  - Land: 5.78 sq mi (14.98 km^{2})
  - Water: 0.0077 sq mi (0.02 km^{2})
- Elevation: 3,041 ft (927 m)

Population (2020)
  - Total: 1,457
  - Density: 251.9/sq mi (97.25/km^{2})
- Time zone: UTC-5 (Eastern (EST))
  - Summer (DST): UTC-4 (EDT)
- ZIP code: 28604
- Area code: 828
- GNIS feature ID: 2584317
- Website: https://www.foscoenc.com

Foscoe is an unincorporated community and census-designated place in Watauga County, North Carolina, United States. The community is located on NC 105, southwest of Boone. As of the 2020 census, Foscoe had a population of 1,457.

The community is between Seven Devils and Shulls Mill. Multiple shops dot the main highway, serving a tourist clientele. Its development, since the 1980s, is thanks to year-round tourism to nearby attractions, notably Grandfather Mountain.

Historically, the East Tennessee and Western North Carolina Railroad (Nicknamed "Tweetsie") passed through the area until flooding destroyed the tracks in 1940. In 1956, NC 105 was built over the original rail bed.

== Demographics ==
Historical population
| Census | Pop. | Note | %± |
|---|---|---|---|
| 2020 | 1,457 | | — |
U.S. Decennial Census

== See also ==
- Blue Ridge Parkway
- Flattop Mountain
- Hanging Rock
- Peak Mountain
- Sugar Mountain
- Watauga River
