= Peak Mountain (North Carolina) =

Mountain in North Carolina, United States

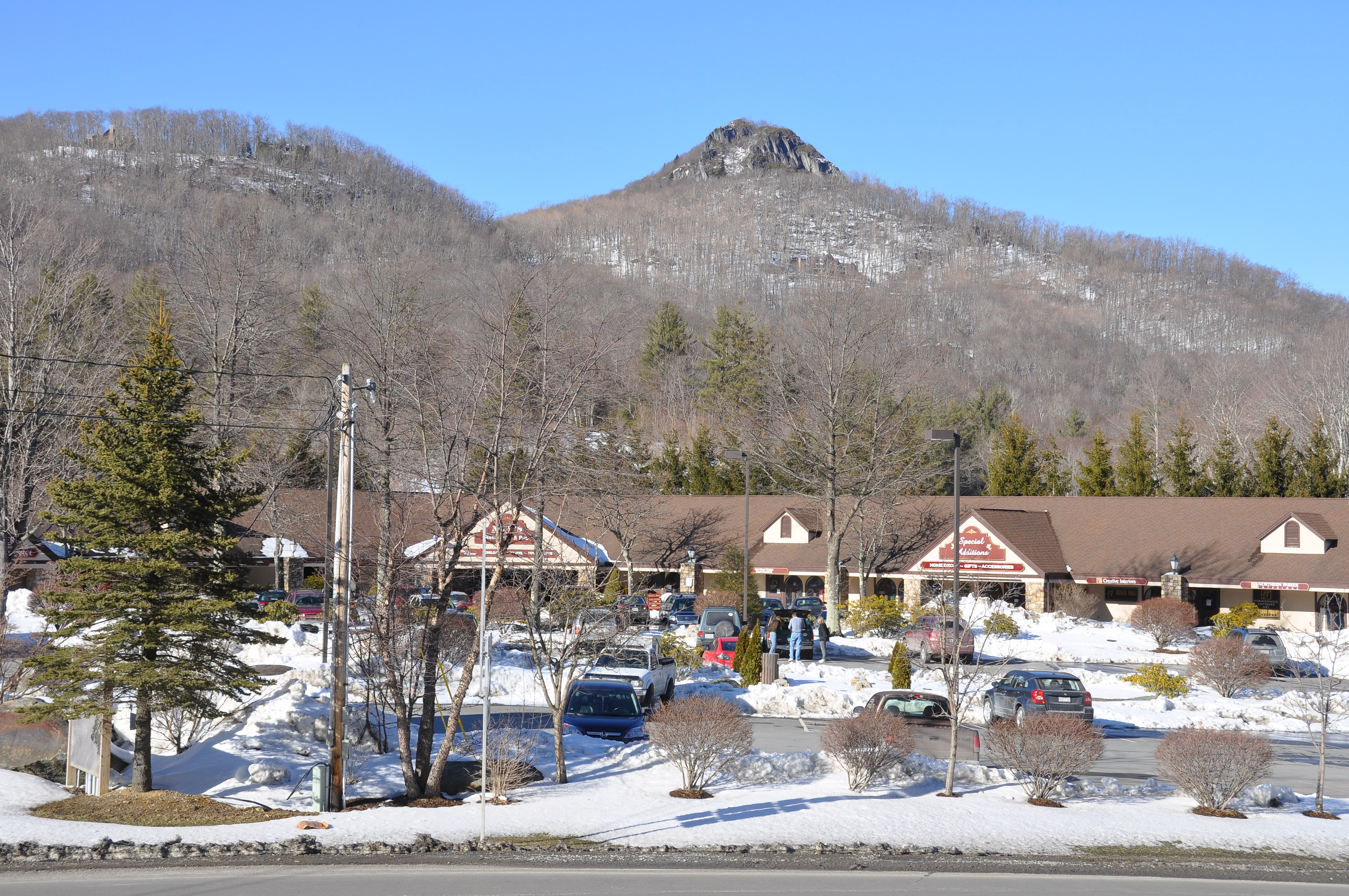
- Peak Mountain, from Tynecastle (Linville Gap)

Highest point
- Elevation: 4,921 ft (1,500 m)
- Coordinates: 36°07′51″N 81°50′01″W

Geography
- Location within North Carolina
- Location: Avery County, North Carolina, U.S.
- Parent range: Blue Ridge Mountains
- Topo map: USGS Valle Crucis

Peak Mountain is a mountain in the North Carolina High Country, near the town of Seven Devils. It is known by several other names such as Tynecastle Peak, Invershiel Peak and Dunvegan Peak. It is wholly in the Pisgah National Forest. Its elevation reaches 4,921 feet (1,500 m).

The headwaters of the Elk River begins from the Northwestern slopes of the mountain; along the Southwestern slopes, it shares with Sugar Mountain and Flattop Mountain as the headwaters of the Linville River; along the Southeastern slopes, it shares with Grandfather Mountain as the headwaters of the Watauga River.

== Attractions ==
Hawksnest Snow Tubing and Zipline, located along northern ridge of the mountain in the town of Seven Devils, offers zip lining year round and snow tubing in late fall and winter. Though no official trails go up Peak Mountain, Grandfather Mountain's hiking trail, Profile Trail, starts nearby on NC Hwy 105 (permit required).

== History ==
In December, 2019, the Blue Ridge Conservancy purchased 91 acres of Peak Mountain including the summit from the Schwebke family for $1.3 million.
