= Linville River =

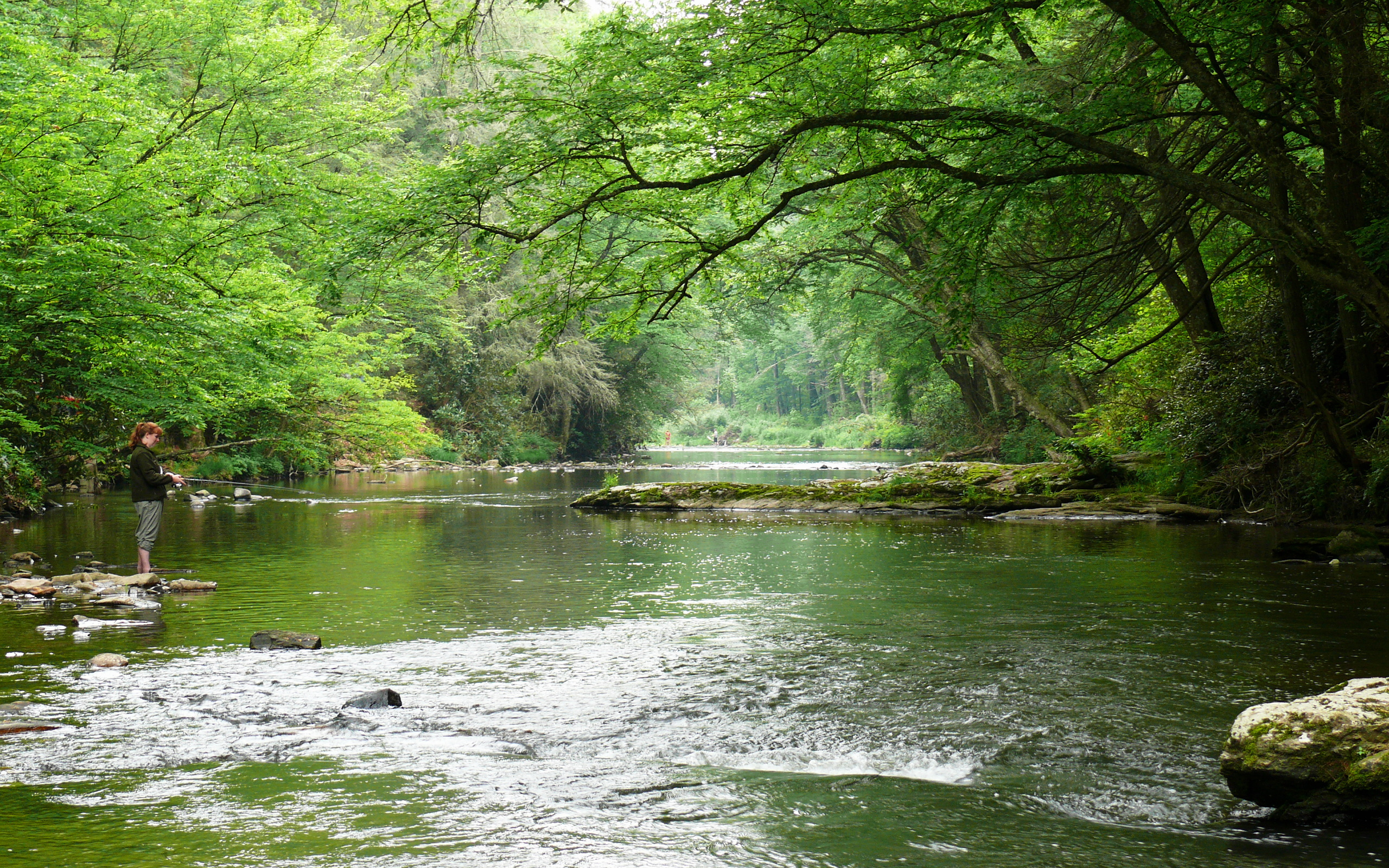
- Linville River

- Location of the mouth of Linville River in North Carolina

Location
- Country: United States
- State: North Carolina
- Counties: Avery, Burke

Physical characteristics
- Source: Linville Gap
  - location: Sugar Mountain, North Carolina
  - coordinates: 36°07′23″N 81°50′44″W
  - elevation: 4,051 ft (1,235 m)
- Mouth: Catawba River
  - location: Glen Alpine, North Carolina
  - coordinates: 35°44′35″N 81°50′11″W
  - elevation: 1,230 ft (370 m)

Basin features
- Progression: Linville → Catawba → Wateree → Santee → Atlantic Ocean
- River system: Catawba River
- Tributaries
  - left: Little Grassy Creek, Big Grassy Creek, Stacey Creek, Cow Branch, Buckwheat Branch, Canoe Branch, Camp Creek (North Carolina), Gulf Branch, Bull Branch, Chimney Branch, Cambric Branch, White Creek
  - right: Linville West Fork, Jenny Branch, Crossnore Creek, Bill White Creek, Golden Creek, Shooks Creek
- Waterfalls: Linville Falls

The Linville River is a river in western North Carolina, United States. The river begins in the slopes of Peak Mountain, Sugar Mountain and Flattop Mountain, in the Linville Gap area (also known as Tynecastle). As it goes south through Avery County, it passes through the communities of Grandfather, Linville, Pineola, Crossnore and finally at Linville Falls. After entering Burke County at the community of Linville Falls, the river becomes the centerpiece of the Linville Falls and the Linville Gorge, an area referred to as "the Grand Canyon of North Carolina." After approximately 30 miles (48 km), the river ends at Lake James and the Catawba River; the original confluence with the Catawba River has been flooded by the creation of the reservoir in 1923.

In 1975, North Carolina designated 13.0 miles (20.9 km) of the river as Linville State Natural River, including it in the state's Natural and Scenic Rivers System.
