= Bear's Paw =

Mountain in North Carolina, United States

- Hanging Rock
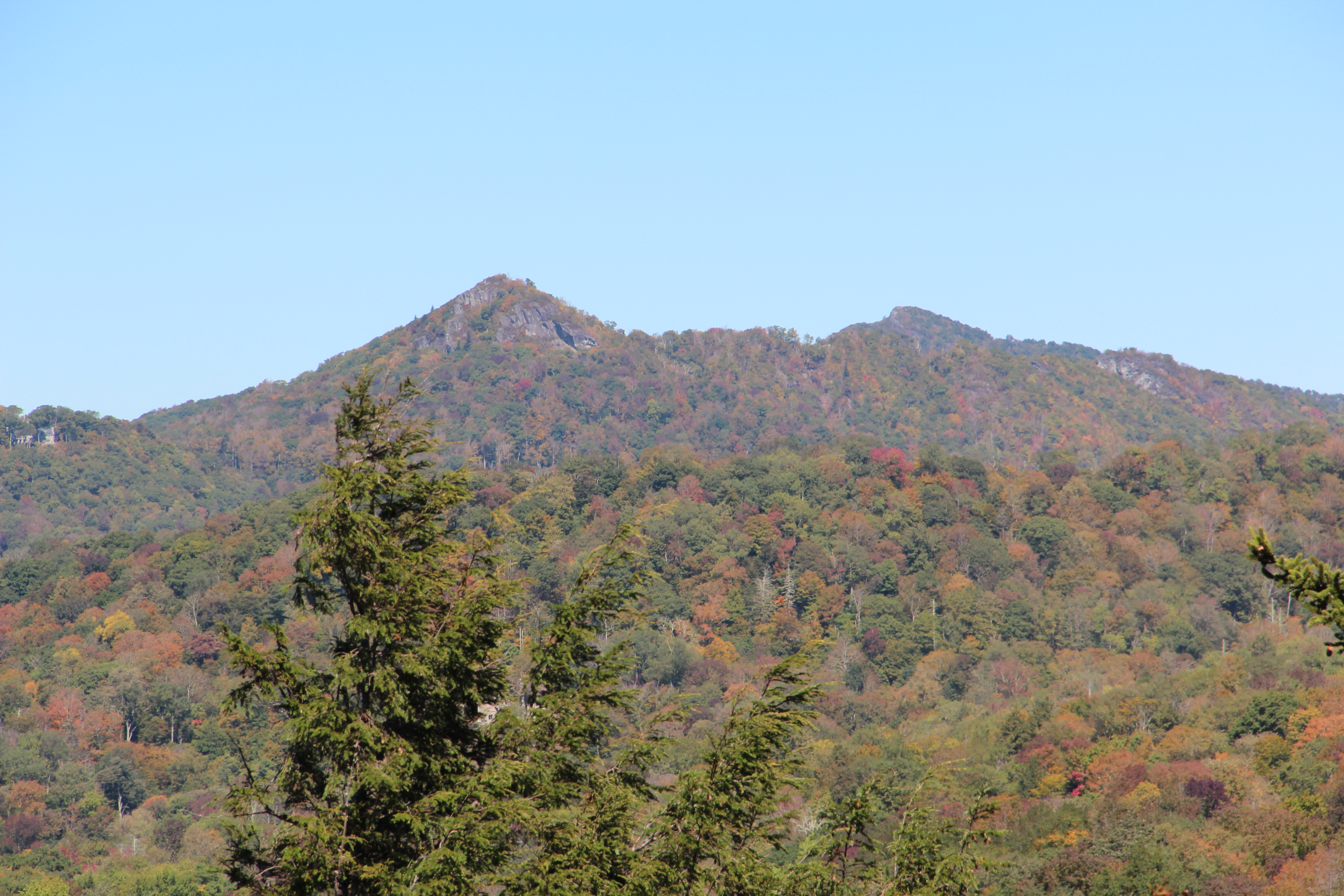
- Peak Mountain (left) and Bear's Paw (right) viewed from Grandfather Mountain

Highest point
- Elevation: 5,203 ft (1,586 m)
- Prominence: 1,080 ft (330 m)
- Coordinates: 36°09′13″N 81°49′27″W

Geography
- Location within North Carolina Location within the United States
- Location: Avery / Watauga counties, North Carolina, U.S.
- Parent range: Blue Ridge Mountains
- Topo map: USGS Valle Crucis

Hanging Rock, also known as Bear's Paw (Yonah‑wayah in Cherokee), is a mountain in the North Carolina High Country, next to the town of Seven Devils. It is along the Avery and Watauga border. Its elevation reaches 5,203 feet (1,586 m). The mountain generates feeder streams for the Elk and Watauga rivers.

In 2008, Bear Paw State Natural Area was established on the mountain by the North Carolina General Assembly. The High Country Conservancy acquired the initial 350 acres (1.4 km^{2}) for the state, and the park now encompasses 384 acres (1.55 km^{2}). The natural area is located just north of Grandfather Mountain State Park, and it protects Hanging Rock Ridge and the headwaters of Dutch Creek. It is managed by Grandfather Mountain State Park.

== See also ==
- List of mountains in North Carolina
