= Avery County Airport =

Public airport in North Carolina

Avery County Airport Morrison Field
- IATA: none; ICAO: none; FAA LID: 7A8

Summary
- Airport type: Public
- Owner: Avery County Airport Authority
- Serves: Spruce Pine, North Carolina; Newland, North Carolina
- Location: Avery County, North Carolina
- Opened: November 1962
- Elevation AMSL: 2,745 ft / 836 m
- Coordinates: 35°56′43.3″N 81°59′46.4″W

Map
- Location of airport in North Carolina

Runways
| Direction | Length | | Surface |
| Direction | ft | m | Surface |
|---|---|---|---|
| 17/35 | 3,001 | 915 | Asphalt |

Avery County Airport (FAA LID: 7A8), also known as Morrison Field, is a public-use general aviation airport located in Avery County, North Carolina, United States. Situated 4 miles (6.4 km) northeast of Spruce Pine and 10 miles (16 km) southwest of Newland, the airport serves both Avery County and Mitchell County. It is owned by the Avery County Airport Authority.

== Facilities and operations ==
Avery County Airport features one 3,001-ft long asphalt runway designated 17/35, as well as a helipad measuring at 40 ft x 40 ft. The airport offers 27 privately owned hangars, as well as private contractors who offer private air services, flying lessons and charter flights.

Since 2016, the airport has undergone numerous renovations. These include improvements to its fueling systems, runway, and the Experimental Aircraft Association building located on the grounds.

In 2018, the Avery County Airport Authority made cursory inquiries into resurfacing the runway to allow for landing heavier aircraft after the NC Air National Guard expressed interest in using the facility to conduct C-130 touch-and-go training exercises. The improved runway would also be used by US Marine Corps for vertical takeoff training for its V-22 Osprey aircraft, as has the NC Army National Guard for its helicopters stationed at Salisbury Airport.

JAARS, a Christian mission aviation organization based in Union County, uses a grass area just east of the runway as a landing strip for pilot training.

== History ==
Avery County Airport was opened as a 2,400-ft long private-use grass airstrip in the 1950s. In 1962, a small group of local businessmen met with district representatives in Washington and secured FAA funding for the airstrip, at which point it became open to the public.

In 1993, the state legislature proposed the creation of the Avery County Airport Authority which was ratified in 1994. The Authority consists of board members representing both Avery and Mitchell counties. The ratification was followed by the paving of the sole runway as well as its extension to its current 3,001 feet. The runway was repaved in 2017.

Since 1968, the airport has alternatively been referred to as Morrison Field in honor of Robert Foster Morrison, a Pineola resident who inherited a large fortune from his uncle which he placed in a trust that funded three hospitals in Avery County as well as a library in Newland.

== See also ==
- List of airports in North Carolina
