= Peak Mountain (disambiguation) =

Peak Mountain is a mountain in East Granby, Connecticut.

Peak Mountain may also refer to:

- Peak Mountain (North Carolina), a mountain in North Carolina
- Peak Mountain, San Mateo County, a summit in the San Francisco Bay Area
- Peak Mountain, the highest point of the Sierra Madre range, southwestern California
