= Vale, North Carolina =

Vale, North Carolina may refer to:

- Vale, Avery County, North Carolina
- Vale, Lincoln County, North Carolina
