= Gragg, North Carolina =

Gragg
- Unincorporated community
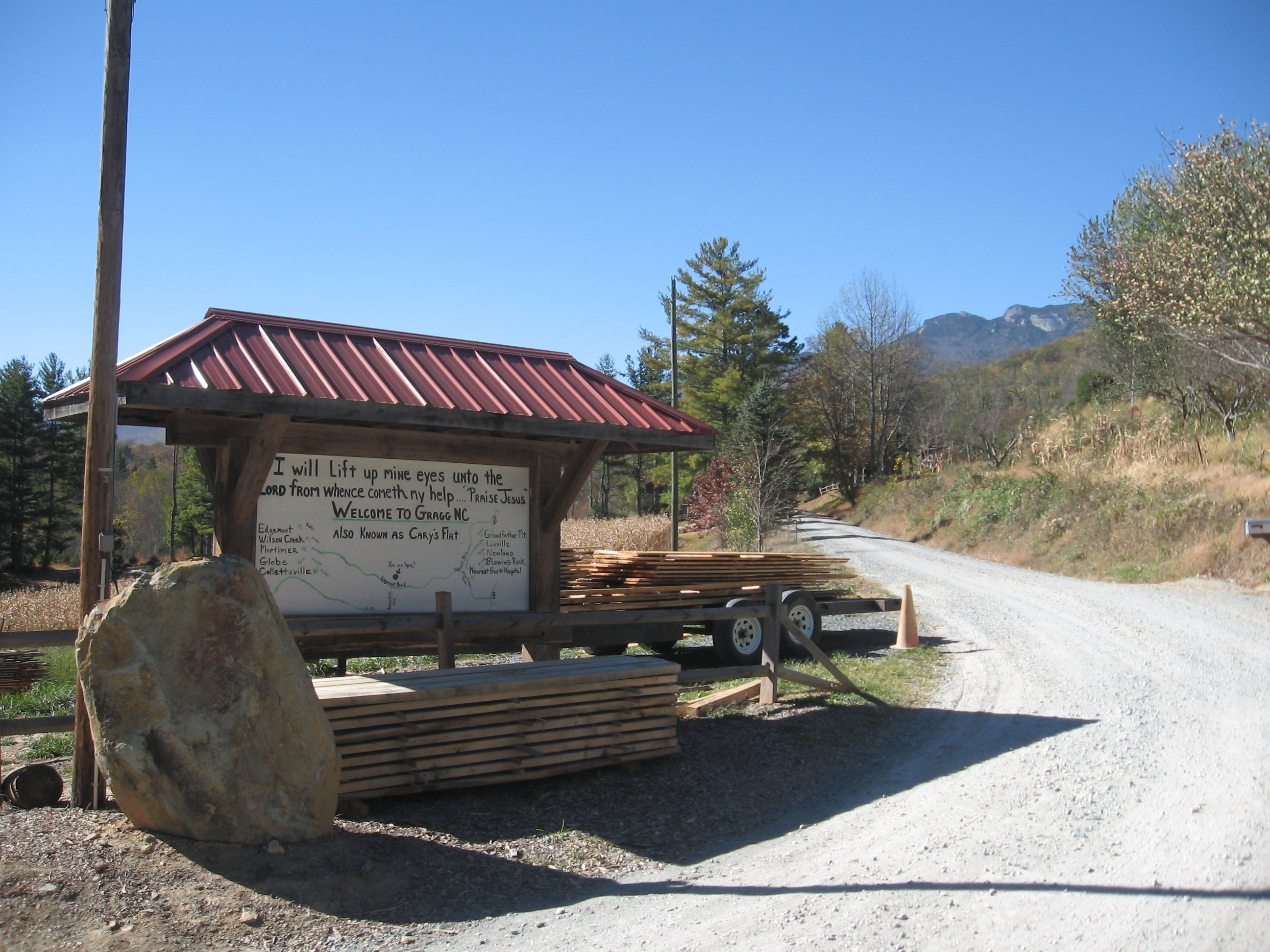
- Gragg, NC

- Location within the state of North Carolina
- Coordinates: 36°04′23″N 81°46′14″W
- Country: United States
- State: North Carolina
- County: Avery County
- Named for: William Gragg
- Elevation: 2,664 ft (812 m)
- Time zone: UTC-5 (Eastern (EST))
  - Summer (DST): UTC-4 (EDT)
- ZIP code: 28645
- Area code: 828
- GNIS feature ID: 1020484

Gragg is an unincorporated community in Avery County, North Carolina, United States, spanning approximately one-half mile in radius from the intersection of Edgemont Road and Globe Road. Gragg can be accessed from US 221 via mile marker #305 on the Blue Ridge Parkway. The area was originally known as "'Carey's Flat'".

== Photo gallery ==
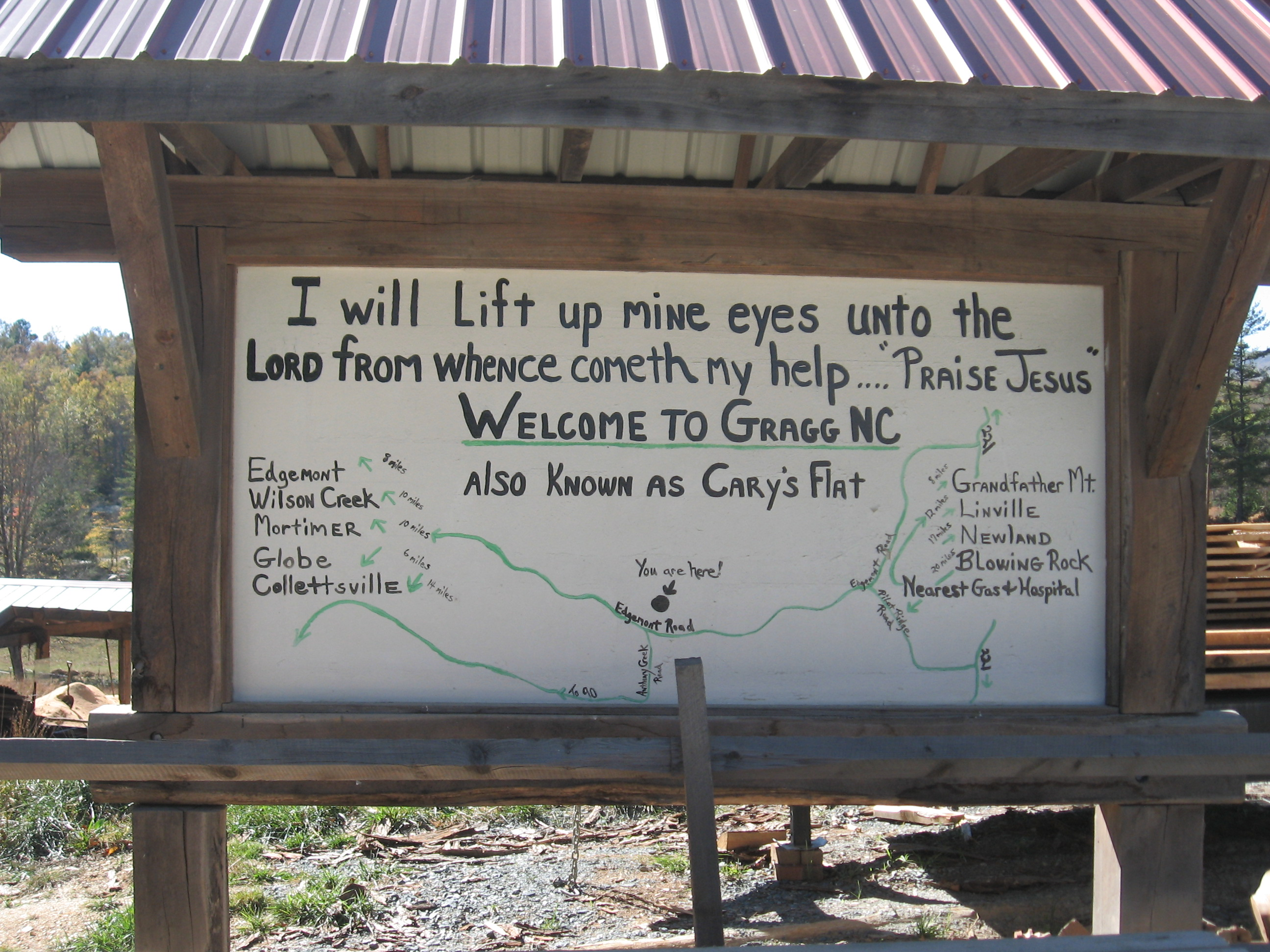
Welcome to Gragg, NC

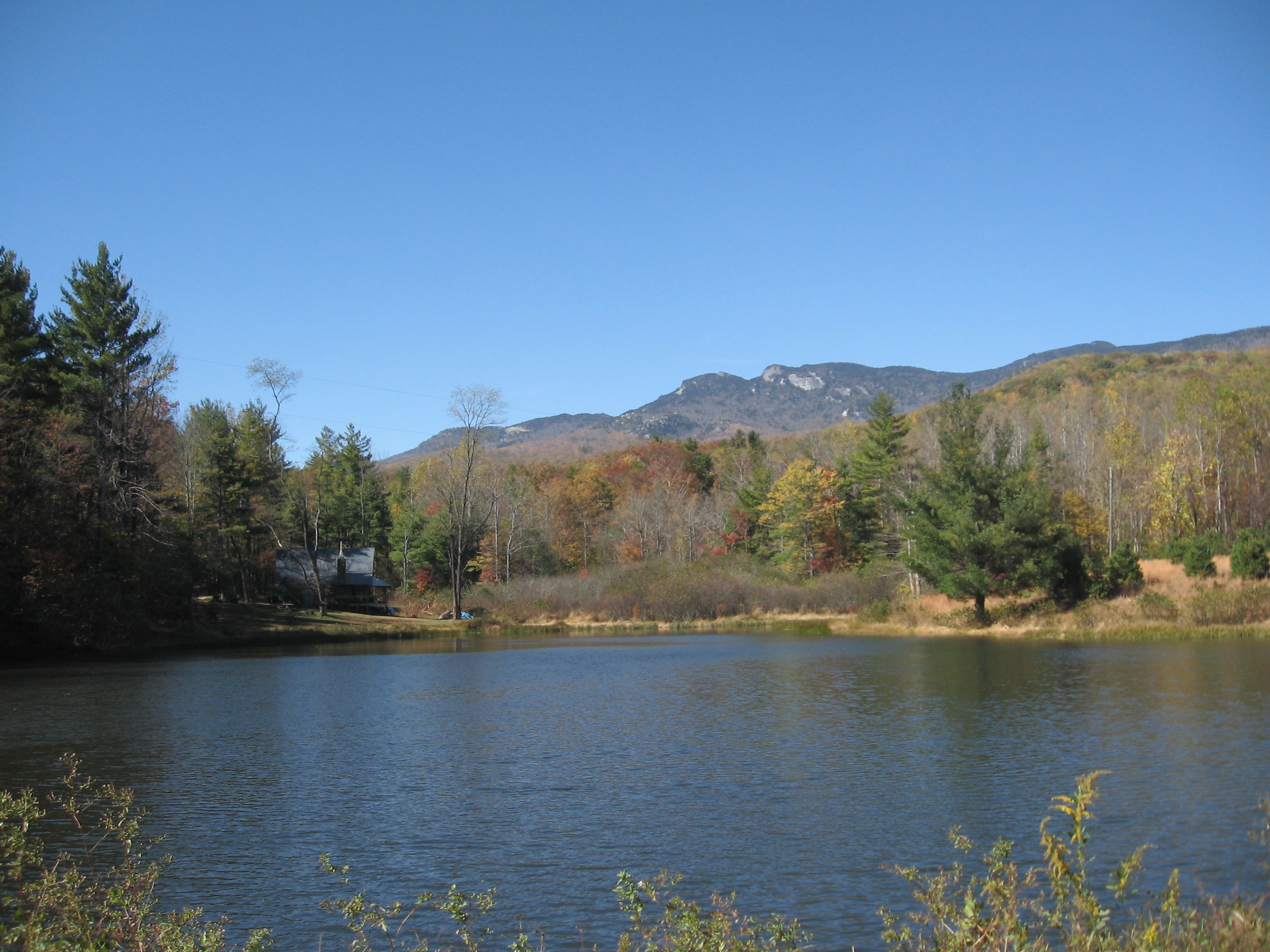
Coffey Trout Lake

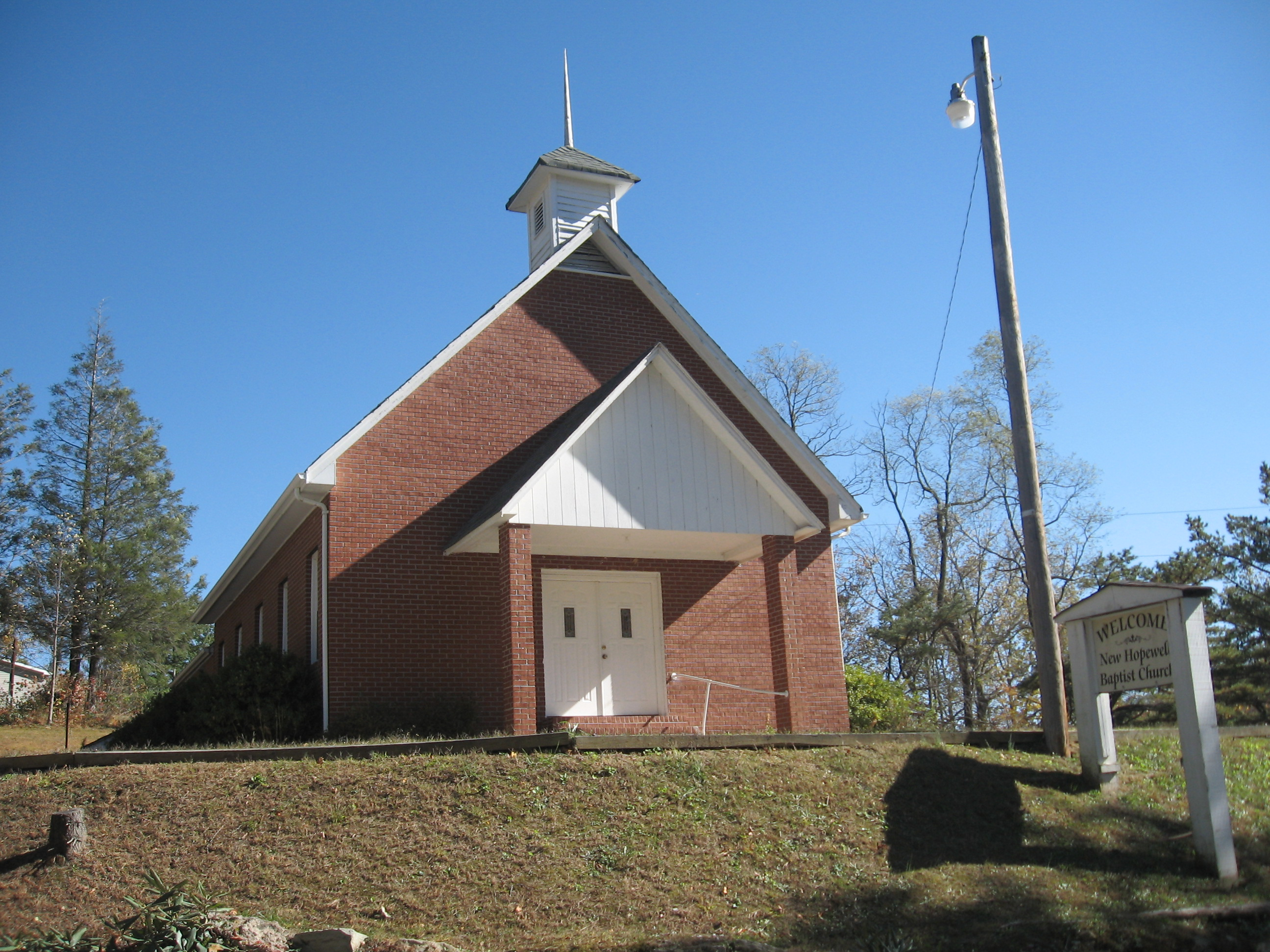
New Hopewell Baptist Church

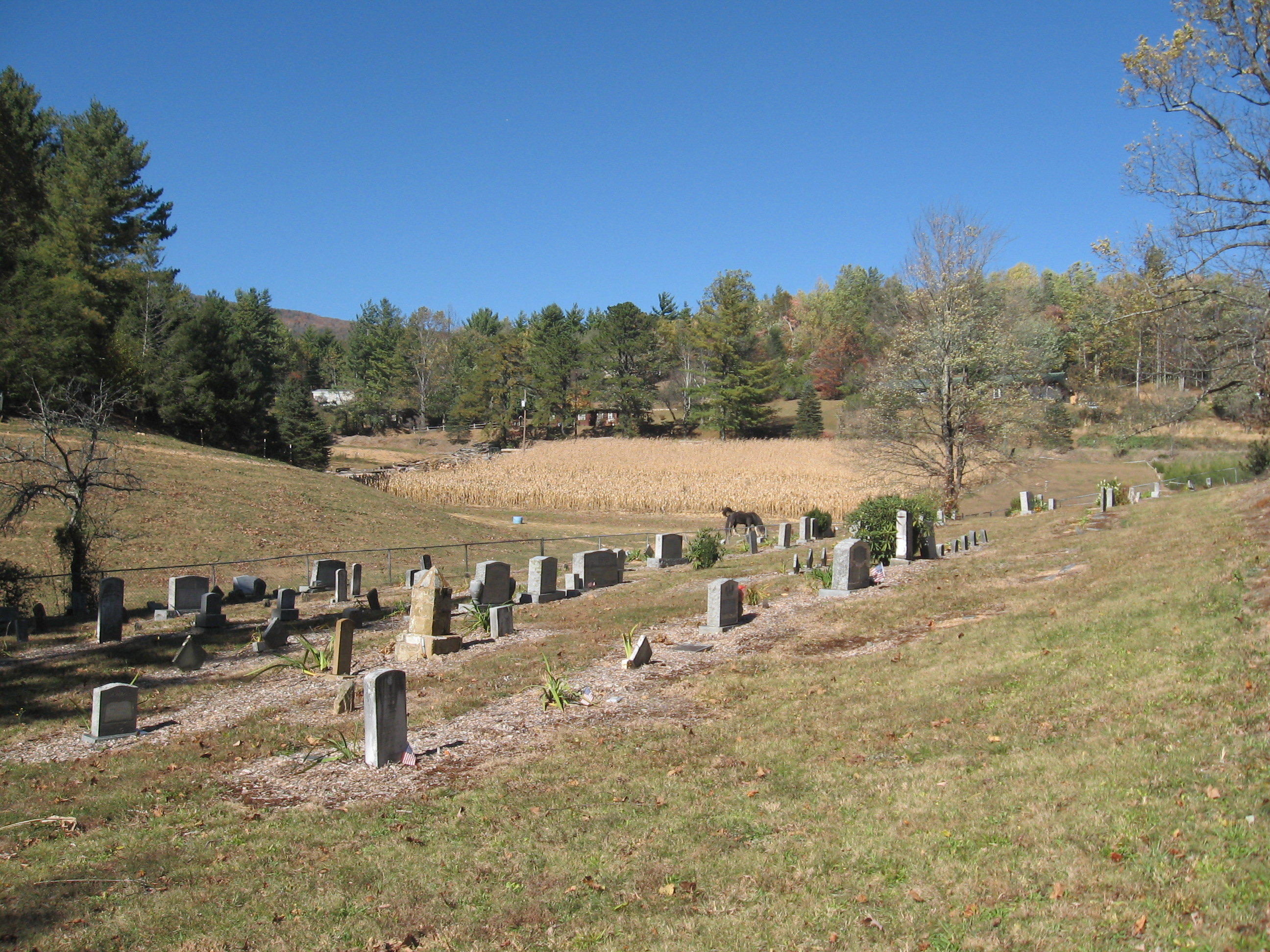
New Hopewell Baptist Church Cemetery

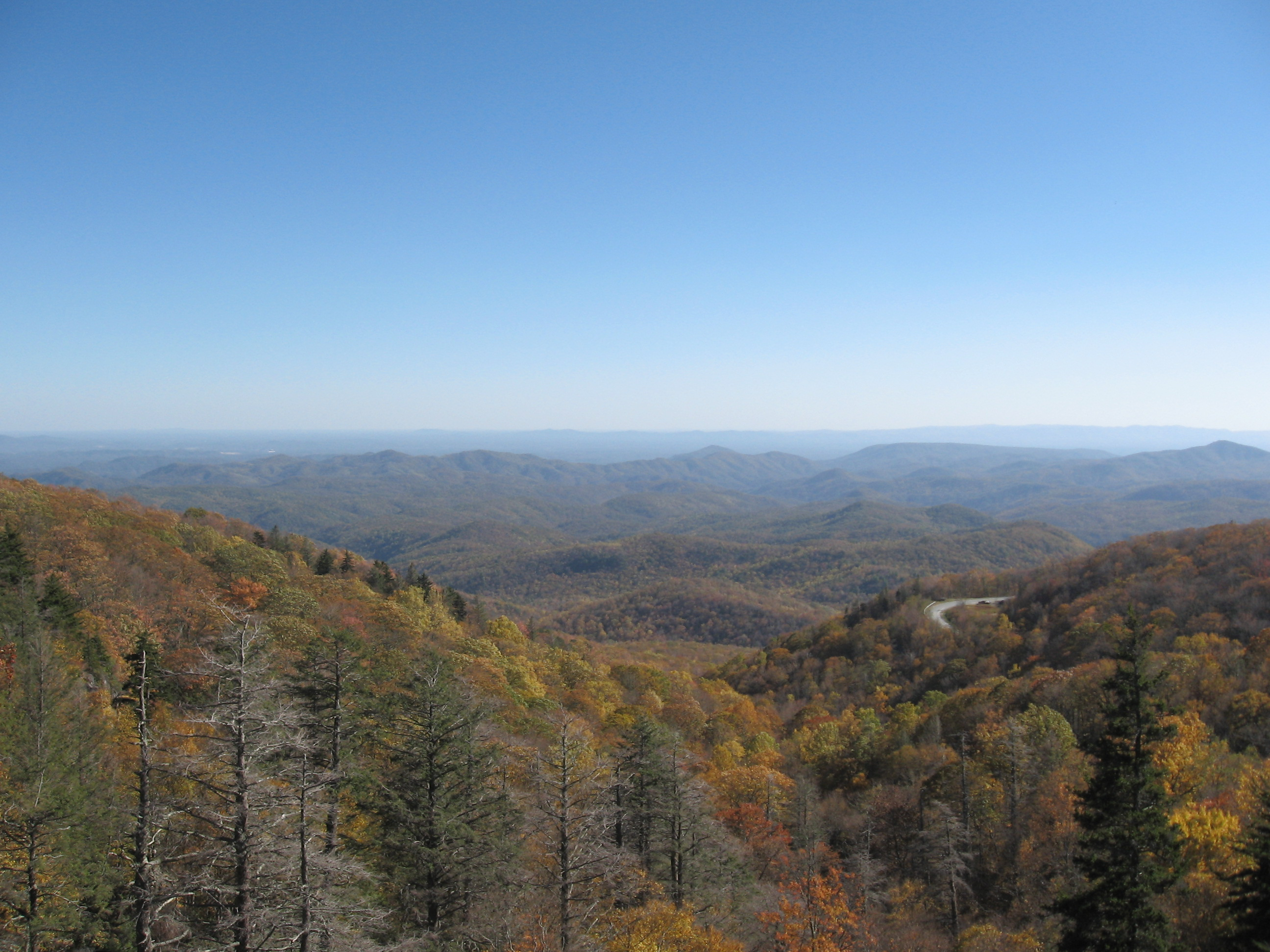
View overlooking Gragg, NC from the Stack Rock Creek Bridge on the Blue Ridge Parkway (mile marker 304.5)

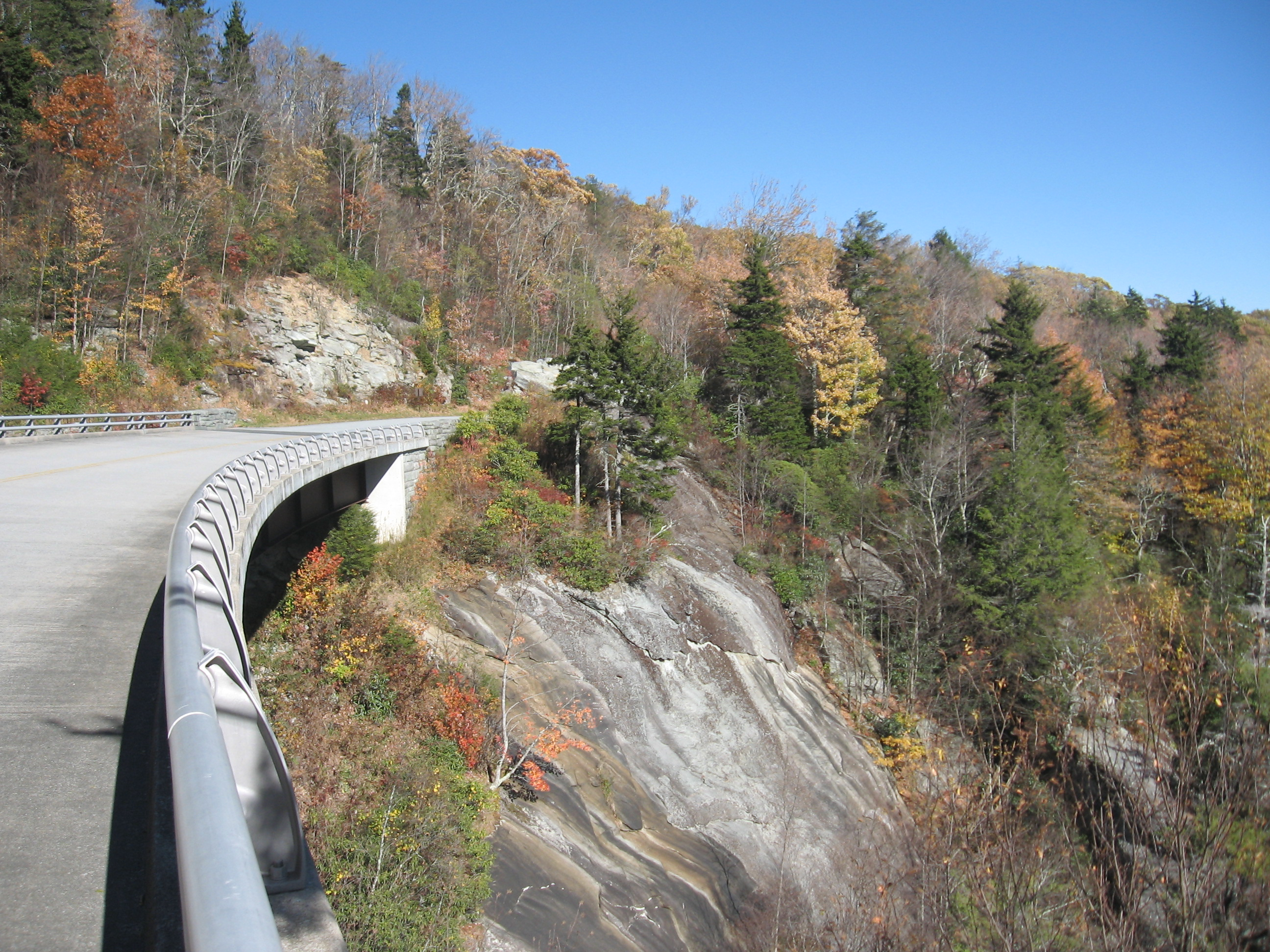
Stack Rock Creek Bridge at Blue Ridge Parkway mile marker 304.5

== See also ==
- Blue Ridge Parkway
- Brown Mountain
- Grandfather Mountain
- Grandmother Mountain
- Sugar Mountain
