= Minneapolis (disambiguation) =

Minneapolis is the most populous city in the U.S. state of Minnesota.

Minneapolis may also refer to:

== Places ==
- Minneapolis–Saint Paul, the most populous urban area in the U.S. state of Minnesota
- Minneapolis, Kansas, an American city in Ottawa County
- Minneapolis, North Carolina, an American community in Avery County

== Other uses ==
- Minneapolis, St. Paul and Sault Ste. Marie Railroad, an American railway also known as the "Soo Line"
- Minneapolis Shoal Light Station, a lighthouse near Green Bay in the U.S. state of Michigan
- USS Minneapolis, several ships of the United States Navy
- Minneapolis a 1992 single by Underworld using their short lived Lemon Interrupt alias.
