= Linville Falls =

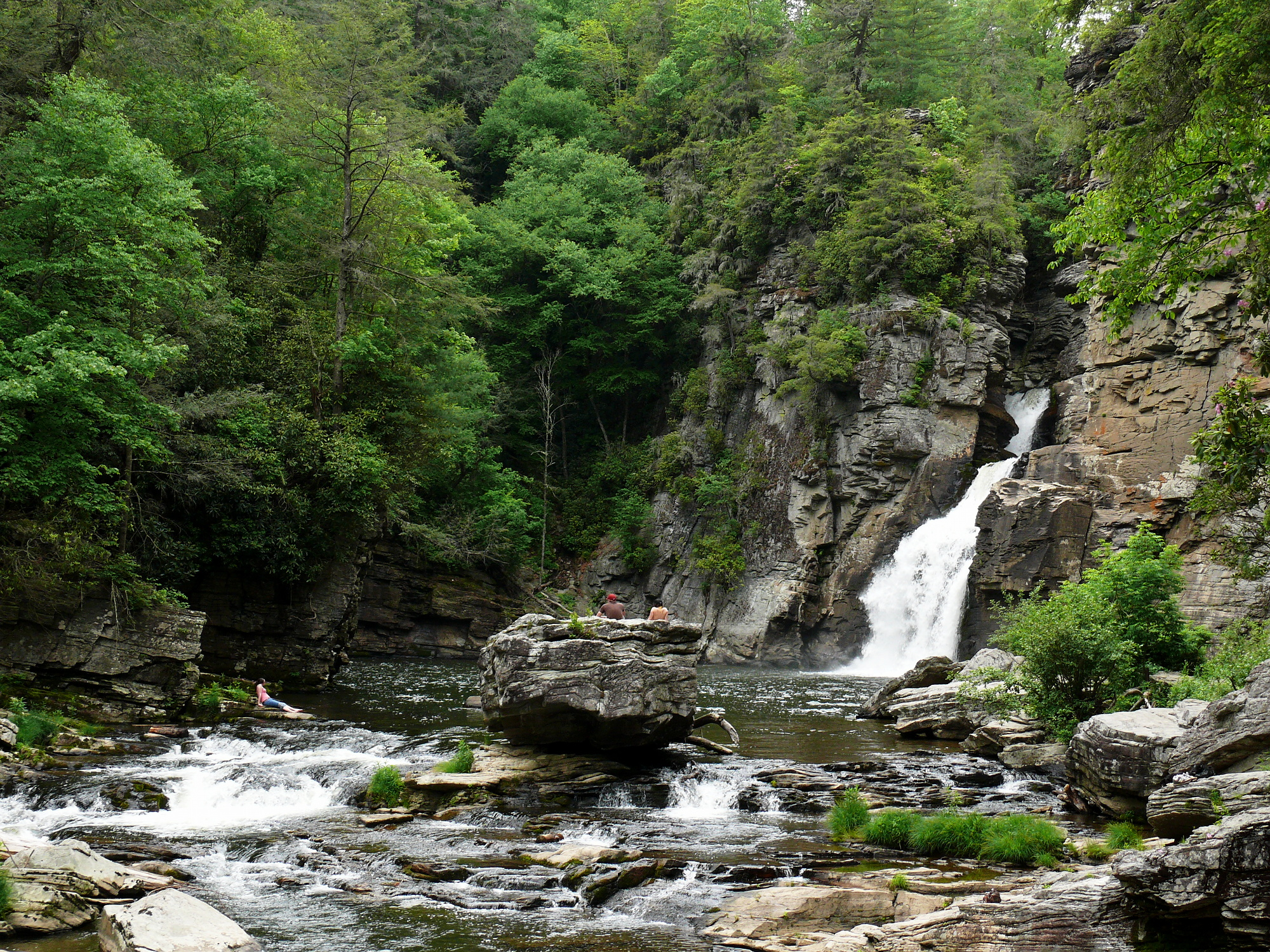
- Interactive map of Linville Falls
- Location: Blue Ridge Mountains, Burke County, North Carolina
- Coordinates: 35.949572°N 81.926778°W
- Type: Tiered
- Total height: 150 ft (46 m)
- Number of drops: 4

Linville Falls is a waterfall located in the Blue Ridge Mountains of North Carolina in the United States. The falls move in several distinct steps, beginning in a twin set of upper falls, moving down a small gorge, and culminating in a high-volume 45-foot (14 m) drop.

It is named for the Linville River, which goes over the falls. Linville Falls has the highest volume of any waterfall on the Northern Edge of the Blue Ridge Mountains.

== Natural history ==
Linville Falls marks the beginning of the Linville Gorge, which is formed by the Linville River, which continues on after the falls before finally ending near Lake James.

At one time, the upper section of the main plunge was the same height as the lower section, however, flooding caused the upper section to collapse on top of the lower falls, making the lower falls a considerably longer plunge.

== History ==
The Carnegie Hero Fund Commission recounted an incident. "Charles W. Davis, 23, beekeeper, saved Hallie L. Hartman, 20, from drowning, Linville Falls, North Carolina, August 30, 1928. Miss Hartman fell into the Linville River and was carried 300 feet (91 m) through swift water and dropped 30 feet over a fall into a pool in which the water was 45 feet deep and very cold. The banks of the pool were high and precipitous. Davis descended high rock ledges with difficulty to a low ledge at the pool, becoming winded. Fully clothed, he swam 40 feet (12 m) through rough water to Miss Hartman, who was unconscious. Grasping her, he swam 15 feet (4.6 m) with great exertion against a strong undercurrent that pulled toward the falls and then swam 65 feet (20 m) farther to a low point at the bank. As he tried to push Miss Hartman upon the bank, he fell to his knees from fatigue but got to his feet quickly and placed Miss Hartman upon the bank. After prolonged efforts, Miss Hartman was revived."

The falls were donated to the National Park Service in 1952 by John D. Rockefeller Jr. He provided about $100,000 for purchase of the land, including a 1,100-acre (4.5 km^{2}) area surrounding the falls and a part of Linville Gorge, from Giulia Luginbuhl of Des Moines, IA, whose father, F. W. Hossfeld of Morganton, NC, had purchased the property about 1900.

In 2010, professional extreme kayaker Pat Keller safely dropped down the main 35-foot (11 m) falls, which he admitted was not only illegal but “is very unsafe for kayakers and hikers alike."

== Visiting the falls ==
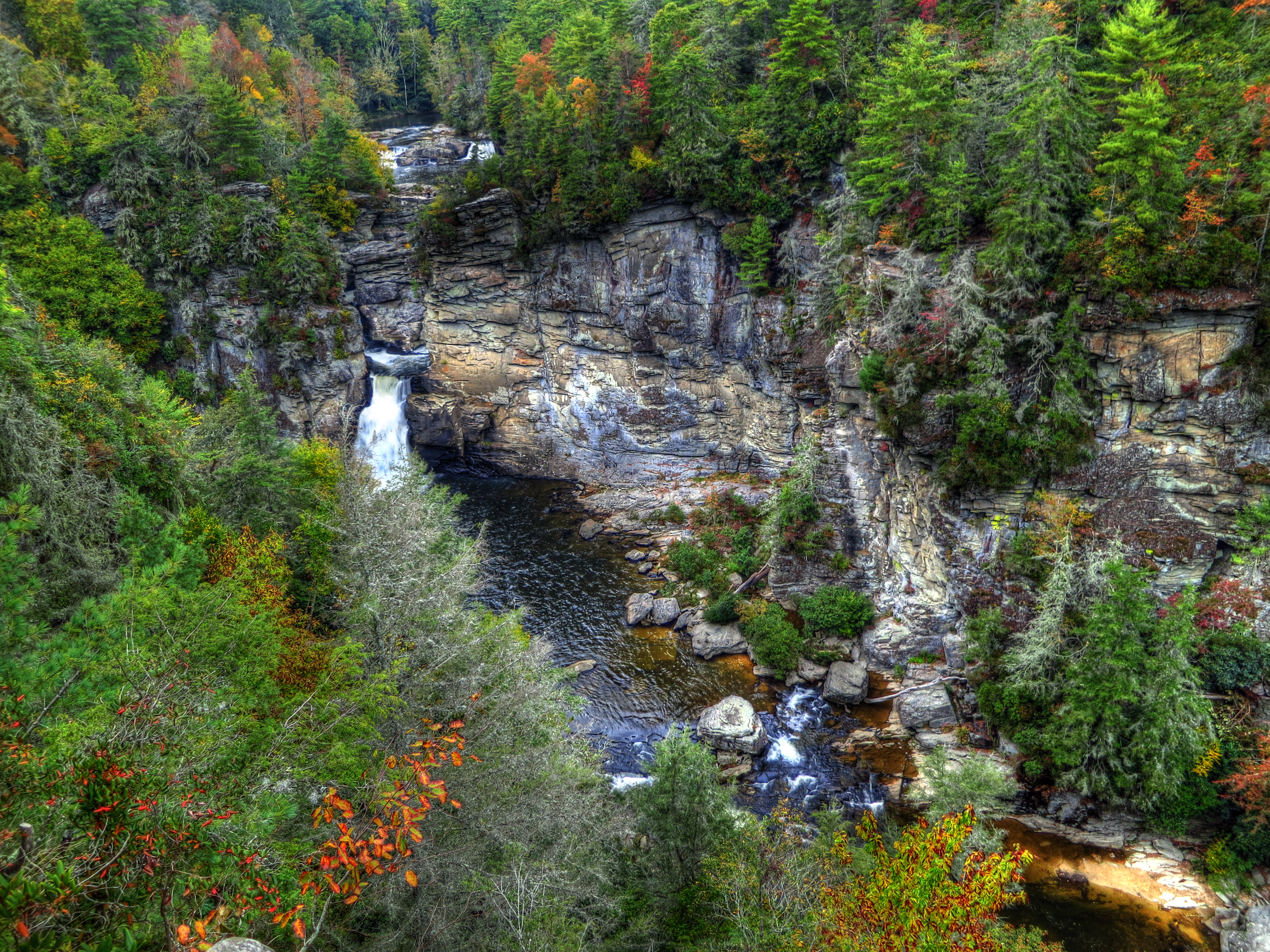

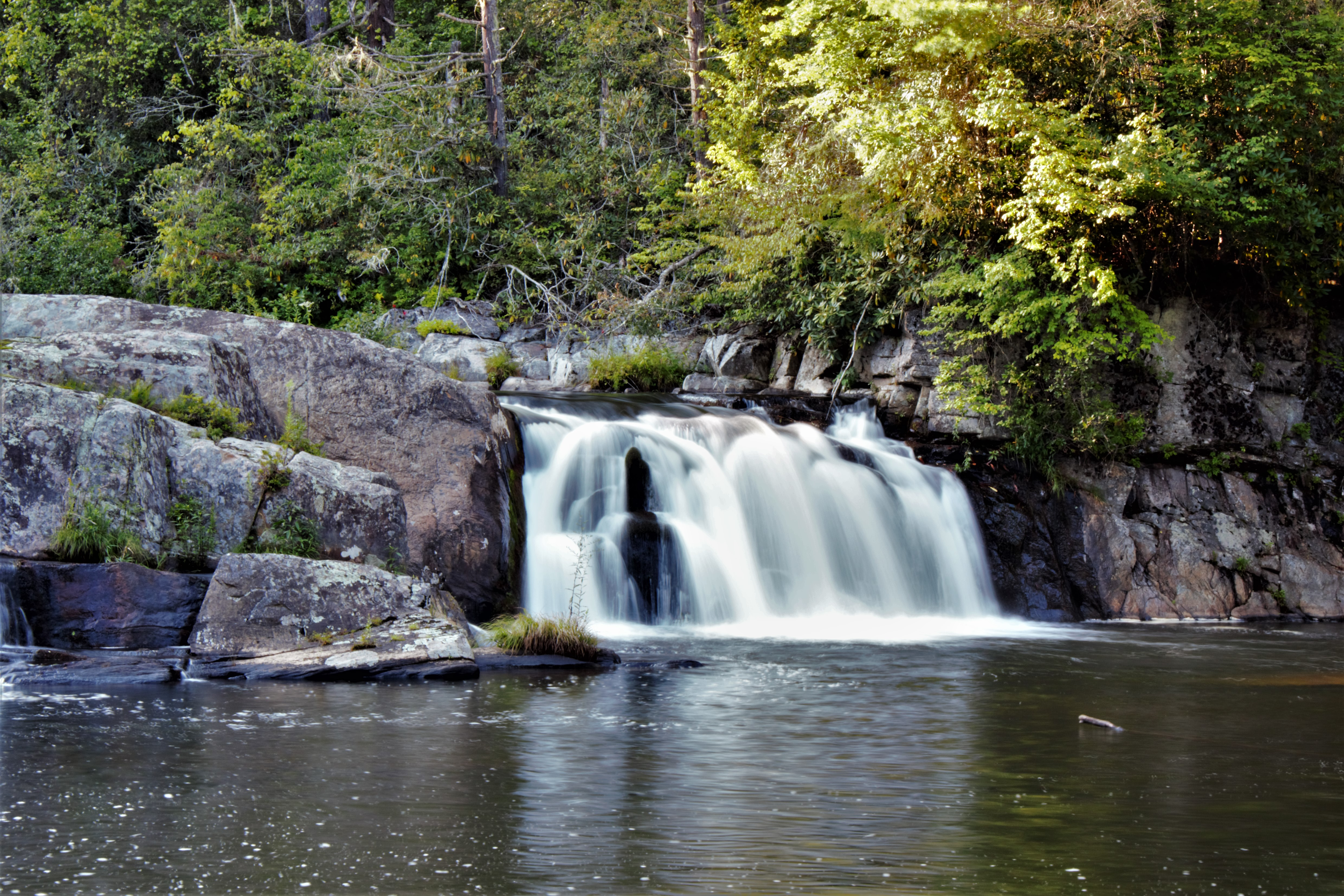

The falls is owned by the National Park Service as part of the Blue Ridge Parkway, which operates a visitor center and several miles of non-handicapped accessible trails with 4 overlooks for the falls. The 0.5-mile (0.80 km) Upper Falls trail leads to the top of the falls, where visitors can see the small twin upper falls and the water spiraling through a small canyon on its way to the main falls.

The Erwin's View trail leads to 2 overlooks, the Chimney View overlook (0.7 miles (1.1 km)) and the Erwin's View overlook (0.8 miles (1.3 km)). The 0.5-mile (0.80 km) Plunge Basin Trail leads to the Plunge Basin Overlook, which provides a view of the falls from the other side of the river. Finally, the 0.7-mile (1.1 km) Gorge Trail, which branches off from the Plunge Basin trail, leads to an area near the foot of the falls.

Swimming is unsafe at the upper falls and is illegal through the entirety of the Blue Ridge Parkway waters; below the falls in normal flow conditions swimming is known to be safe and enjoyable.

== Nearby falls ==
- Duggers Creek Falls is located in the Linville Falls National Recreation Area. It can be reached by the short Duggers Creek Falls trail, which starts at the back right corner of the paved parking lot from the Visitor Center. The small falls can be seen on the right from a footbridge over the creek.
- Toms Creek Falls
- Crabtree Falls

== See also ==
- List of waterfalls
- List of waterfalls in North Carolina
