= Minneapolis, North Carolina =

Minneapolis
- Unincorporated community
- Location within the state of North Carolina
- Coordinates: 36°05′57″N 81°59′13″W
- Country: United States
- State: North Carolina
- County: Avery
- Named for: Minneapolis, Minnesota
- Elevation: 3,665 ft (1,117 m)

Population
  - Total: 429
- Time zone: UTC-5 (Eastern (EST))
  - Summer (DST): UTC-4 (EDT)
- ZIP code: 28652
- Area code: 828
- GNIS feature ID: 1021490

Minneapolis is a community located along US 19-E in Avery County, North Carolina, United States. It shares its name with two other cities nationwide: another small town in Kansas, and the twin city of the capital of Minnesota.

== History ==
As early as 1904, the East Tennessee and Western North Carolina Railroad went through the community of Minneapolis, but bypassed it as it traveled between Cranberry and Montezuma. In 1910 a depot was built, mainly to service a sawmill and asbestos factory; in 1937, the depot was abandoned, but flag stops still continued until 1940. After the rails were removed, the railway bed became the foundation for Old Toe River Road.

== See also ==
- Big Yellow Mountain
- East Tennessee and Western North Carolina Railroad
- North Toe River
