= Flattop Mountain (North Carolina) =

Mountain in North Carolina, United States

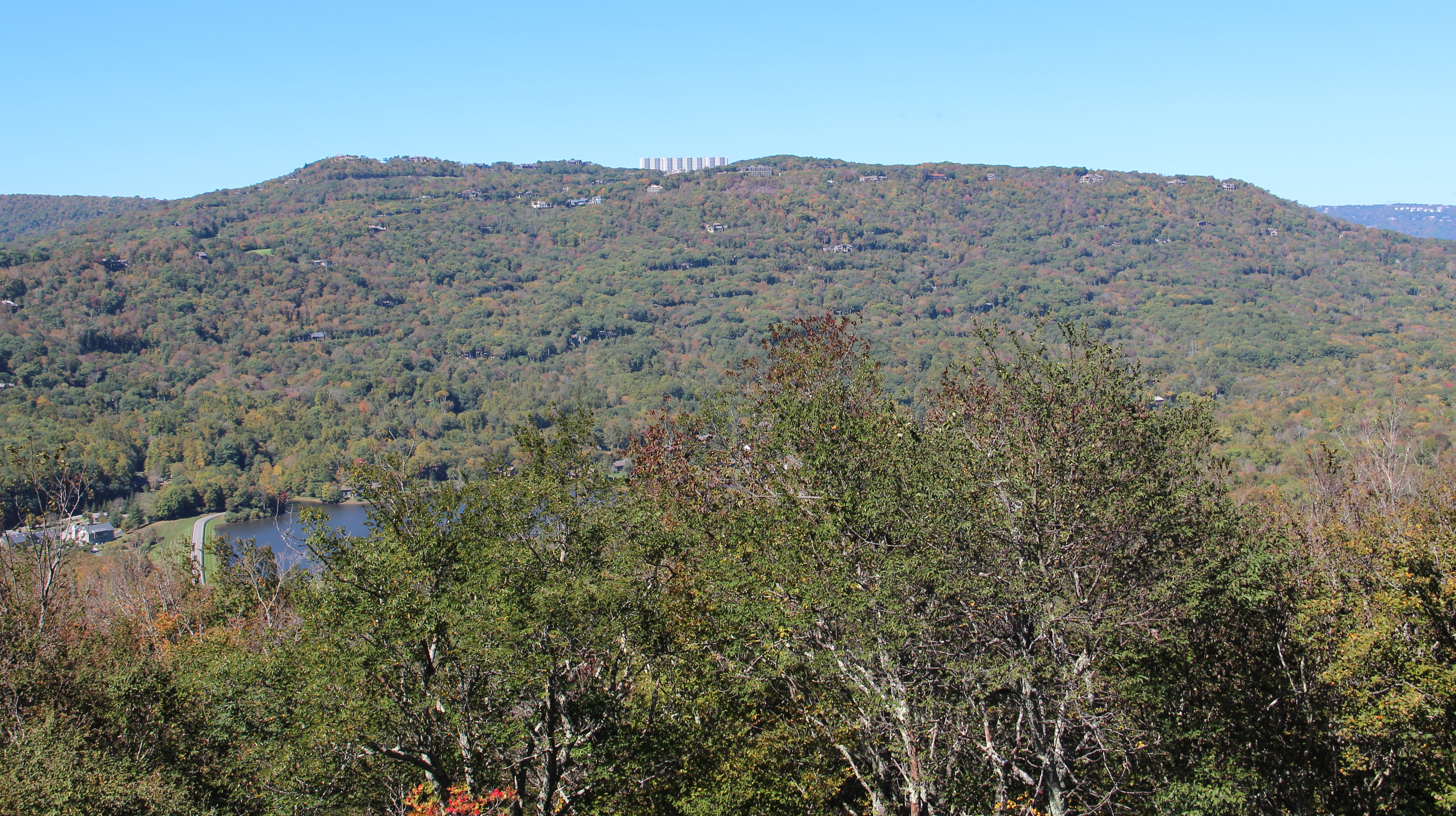
- Flattop Mountain viewed from Grandfather Mountain

Highest point
- Elevation: 4,997 ft (1,523 m)
- Coordinates: 36°06′54″N 81°51′42″W

Geography
- Location within North Carolina
- Location: Avery County, North Carolina, U.S.
- Parent range: Blue Ridge Mountains
- Topo map: USGS Grandfather Mountain

Flattop Mountain is a mountain in High Country near the village of Sugar Mountain. It is located entirely within the Pisgah National Forest and has an elevation of 4,997 feet (1,523 m). Streams that originate on the mountain's slopes flow directly into the Linville River, except on the north slope, where Flattop Creek flows into the Elk River. The Eastern Continental Divide bisects the mountain.

Due to its proximity, Flattop Mountain is sometimes mistaken for a part of Sugar Mountain.

== Attractions ==
The Linville Ridge Golf and Country Club, located on the summit of Flattop Mountain, is open from late spring to early fall.

== See also ==
- List of mountains in North Carolina
