= Vale, Avery County, North Carolina =

Vale
- Unincorporated community
- Location within the state of North Carolina
- Coordinates: 36°05′49″N 81°56′42″W
- Country: United States
- State: North Carolina
- County: Avery County
- Elevation: 3,550 ft (1,082 m)
- Time zone: UTC-5 (Eastern (EST))
  - Summer (DST): UTC-4 (EDT)
- ZIP code: 28657
- Area code: 828
- GNIS feature ID: 1023058

Vale is an unincorporated community in Avery County, North Carolina, United States. It is located northwest of Newland on Old Toe River Road.

== History ==
From 1904 to 1940, Vale was a flag stop along the East Tennessee and Western North Carolina Railroad; between Minneapolis and Newland. Old Toe River Road now resides on what was the old railway path.

== See also ==
- East Tennessee and Western North Carolina Railroad
- North Toe River
