= Cranberry, North Carolina =

Cranberry
- Unincorporated community
- Location within the state of North Carolina
- Coordinates: 36°08′35″N 81°58′01″W
- Country: United States
- State: North Carolina
- County: Avery County
- Founded: 1850
- Named for: Cranberry Creek
- Elevation: 3,130 ft (954 m)
- Time zone: UTC-5 (Eastern (EST))
  - Summer (DST): UTC-4 (EDT)
- ZIP code: 28622
- Area code: 828
- GNIS feature ID: 1019844

Cranberry is an unincorporated community in Avery County, North Carolina, United States. The community was founded in 1850 and was named after Cranberry Creek, which flows in the area. The community is located one mile south from the town of Elk Park, along US 19E.

== History ==
Before the settlement of Cranberry, the area was already known for one of the largest veins of iron ore in the United States. During the Civil War, iron was produced for the Confederate Army. In 1882, the East Tennessee and Western North Carolina Railroad ("Tweetsie") linked Cranberry with Johnson City, Tennessee; it was later extended on to Montezuma in 1904, eventually reaching Boone by 1919. During this time, Cranberry was incorporated as a town and had a hotel, Cafe, stables, post office and general store. It was disincorporated sometime after 1929 when the Cranberry Furnace was closed. Eventually the railroad to Cranberry was decommissioned in 1950. At present, a church, a combined elementary and middle school, a garage, a nursing facility, and a store remain in operation, and the historic old Cranberry High School still stands, which is now a community center.
