= Heaton, North Carolina =

Heaton
- Unincorporated community
- Location within the state of North Carolina
- Coordinates: 36°10′22″N 81°56′33″W
- Country: United States
- State: North Carolina
- County: Avery County
- Elevation: 3,045 ft (928 m)
- Time zone: UTC-5 (Eastern (EST))
  - Summer (DST): UTC-4 (EDT)
- ZIP code: 28622
- Area code: 828
- GNIS feature ID: 1011954

Heaton is an unincorporated community in Avery County, North Carolina, United States. The community is located along NC 194, centered at the Heaton Bridge, which crosses over the Elk River.

== See also ==
- Beech Mountain (North Carolina)
- Elk River (North Carolina)
