= Elk River Airport =

Private airport in North Carolina

- IATA: none; ICAO: none; FAA LID: NC06

Summary
- Airport type: Private
- Owner: Elk River Property Owners Association
- Location: Banner Elk, North Carolina
- Opened: 1969
- Elevation AMSL: 3,468 ft / 1,057 m
- Coordinates: 36°9′37.45″N 81°53′48.41″W

Map
- Location of airport in North Carolina

Runways
Direction	Length		Surface
Direction	ft	m	Surface
12/30	4,600	1,402	Asphalt

Elk River Airport (FAA LID: NC06) is a private-use airport located 2 nautical miles (3.2 km) west of the central business district of Banner Elk, a town in Avery County, North Carolina.

The airport is owned by the Elk River Property Owners Association and is reserved for exclusive use by members of the Elk River Club residential community and approved guests.

== Facilities ==
The airport is parallel to the Banner Elk Highway and is surrounded on all sides by mountainous terrain. Elk River Airport has one runway designated 12/30 with an asphalt surface measuring 4,600 feet by 75 feet (1,402 m x 23 m). The runway lacks runway end identifier lights. The airport offers four hangars.

== See also ==
- List of airports in North Carolina
