= Grandfather, North Carolina =

- Village
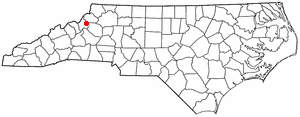
- Location of Grandfather, North Carolina
- Coordinates: 36°05′56″N 81°50′53″W
- Country: United States
- State: North Carolina
- County: Avery
- Named for: Grandfather Mountain

Government
  - Type: Council-manager
  - Mayor: Richard Norman (I)

Area
  - Total: 1.59 sq mi (4.12 km^{2})
  - Land: 1.55 sq mi (4.01 km^{2})
  - Water: 0.042 sq mi (0.11 km^{2})
- Elevation: 3,888 ft (1,185 m)

Population (2020)
  - Total: 24
  - Density: 15.48/sq mi (5.98/km^{2})
- Time zone: UTC-5 (Eastern (EST))
  - Summer (DST): UTC-4 (EDT)
- ZIP code: 28604
- Area code: 828
- FIPS code: 37-27320
- GNIS feature ID: 2407469

Grandfather is a village in Avery County, North Carolina, United States. It is the namesake of Grandfather Mountain. The village is a fully gated community within Grandfather Golf and Country Club, located along NC 105. The population was 24 at the 2020 census.

== Geography ==
According to the United States Census Bureau, the village has a total area of 1.53 square miles (3.95 km^{2}), of which 1.48 square miles (3.84 km^{2}) is land and 0.042 square miles (0.11 km^{2}), or 2.74%, is water.

== Demographics ==
Historical population
Census	Pop.	Note	%±
1990	34		—
2000	73		114.7%
2010	25		−65.8%
2020	24		−4.0%
U.S. Decennial Census; 2020

As of the census of 2000, there were 73 people, 32 households, and 24 families residing in the village. The population density was 48.6 inhabitants per square mile (18.8/km^{2}). There were 377 housing units at an average density of 251.2 units per square mile (97.0 units/km^{2}). The racial makeup of the village was 95.89% White, 1.37% from other races, and 2.74% from two or more races. Hispanic or Latino of any race were 5.48% of the population.

There were 32 households, out of which 25.0% had children under the age of 18 living with them, 71.9% were married couples living together, 6.3% had a female householder with no husband present, and 21.9% were non-families. 21.9% of all households were made up of individuals, and 9.4% had someone living alone who was 65 years of age or older. The average household size was 2.28 and the average family size was 2.60.

In the village, the population was spread out, with 21.9% under the age of 18, 1.4% from 18 to 24, 9.6% from 25 to 44, 37.0% from 45 to 64, and 30.1% who were 65 years of age or older. The median age was 53 years. For every 100 females, there were 82.5 males. For every 100 females age 18 and over, there were 78.1 males.

The median income for a household in the village was $53,125, and the median income for a family was $115,385. Males had a median income of $5,625 versus $29,583 for females. The per capita income for the village was $44,706. There were 7.7% of families and 14.6% of the population living below the poverty line, including 30.8% of under eighteens and none of those over 64.
