= Blue Ridge Conservancy =

The Blue Ridge Conservancy is a non-profit land conservation organization based in Boone, North Carolina that works to preserve working farmland and natural areas in western North Carolina. The organization's focus is on land in Alleghany, Ashe, Avery, Mitchell, Wautauga, Wilkes and Yancey counties.

The Blue Ridge Conservancy was formed in 2010 from the merger of two organizations: the Blue Ridge Land Trust and the High Country Conservancy. Since its founding from the original two organizations, the Blue Ridge Conservancy has protected over 20,000 acres (8,100 ha) through donations, purchases and conservation easements, including lands that have been transferred to the Blue Ridge Parkway and Elk Knob State Park.

The organization is accredited by the Land Trust Accreditation Commission, an independent program of the Land Trust Alliance.
