= Montezuma, North Carolina =

Montezuma
- Unincorporated community
- Location within the state of North Carolina
- Coordinates: 35°58′17″N 82°00′42″W
- Country: United States
- State: North Carolina
- County: Avery County
- Founded: 1883
- Named for: Moctezuma II
- Elevation: 3,766 ft (1,148 m)
- Time zone: UTC-5 (Eastern (EST))
  - Summer (DST): UTC-4 (EDT)
- ZIP code: 28653
- Area code: 828
- GNIS feature ID: 1013656

Montezuma is an unincorporated community in Avery County, North Carolina, United States. Before its founding in 1883, it had two variant names, Aaron and Bull Scrape. The community is located on Old State Highway 181 and is on the Eastern Continental Divide.

== History ==
Between 1904 and 1940, Montezuma was a stop along the East Tennessee and Western North Carolina Railroad ("Tweetsie") between Newland and Linville, with a spur to Pineola.
