= Sugar Mountain (North Carolina) =

Mountain in North Carolina, United States

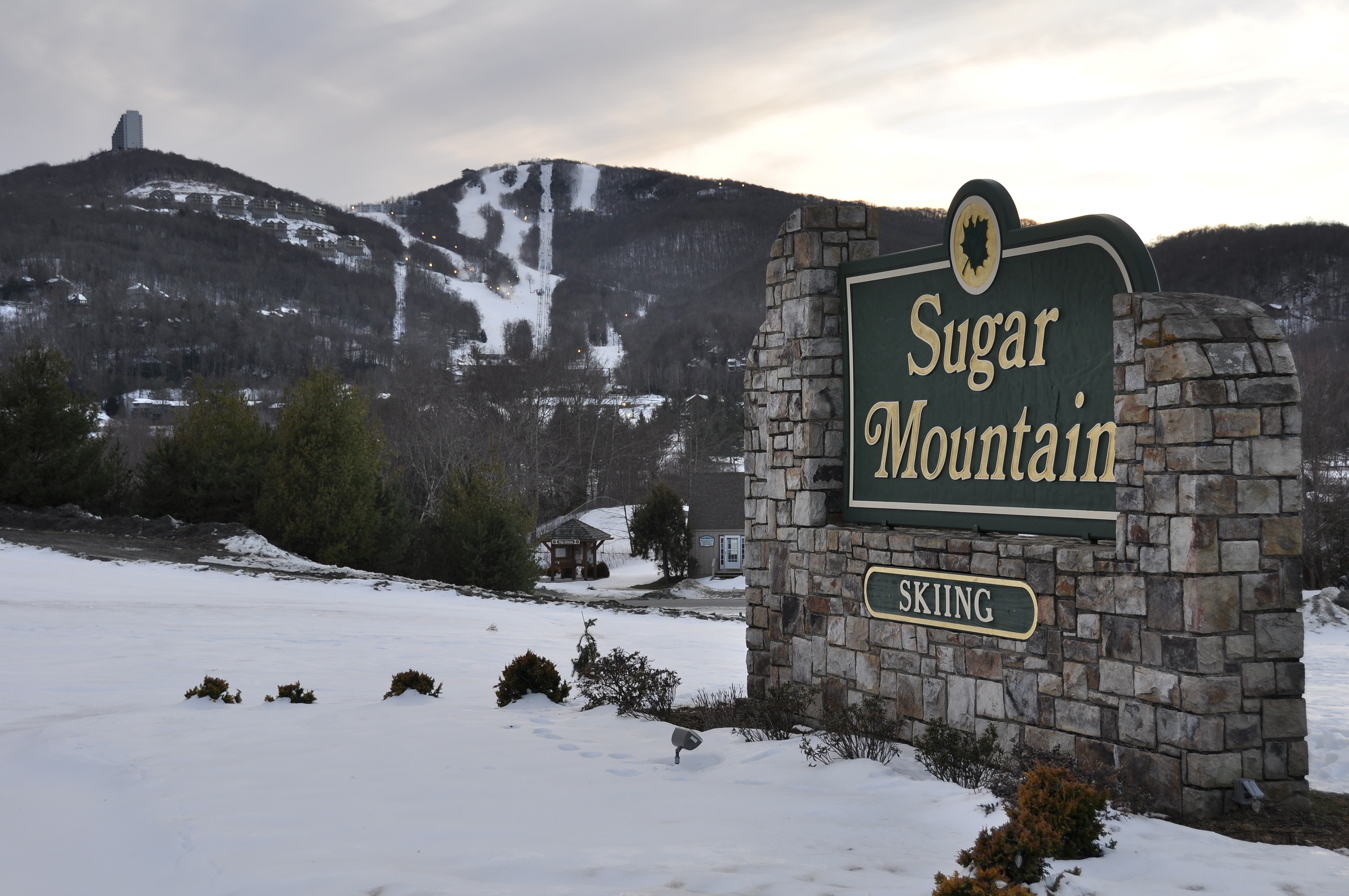

Highest point
- Elevation: 5,236 ft (1,596 m)
- Prominence: 1,160 ft (350 m)
- Coordinates: 36°07′29″N 81°52′33″W

Geography
- Location within North Carolina
- Location: Avery County, North Carolina, U.S.
- Parent range: Blue Ridge Mountains
- Topo map: USGS Newland

Sugar Mountain is a mountain in the North Carolina High Country and wholly in the Pisgah National Forest. Its elevation reaches 5,236 feet (1,596 m) and is split along the Eastern Continental Divide, generating feeder streams for the Linville, Elk, and North Toe rivers. On its north slope resides the Village of Sugar Mountain.

== Attractions ==
Sugar Mountain has two golf courses, Sugar Mountain Country Club and Linville Ridge Country Club (on adjacent Flattop Mountain), which are open late spring to early fall. Walking and mountain bike trails are also open during the summer months on the mountain. In the Winter, the Sugar Mountain Ski Resort is open, and offers skiing, snowboarding, and tubing.

== North Carolina Ridge Law ==
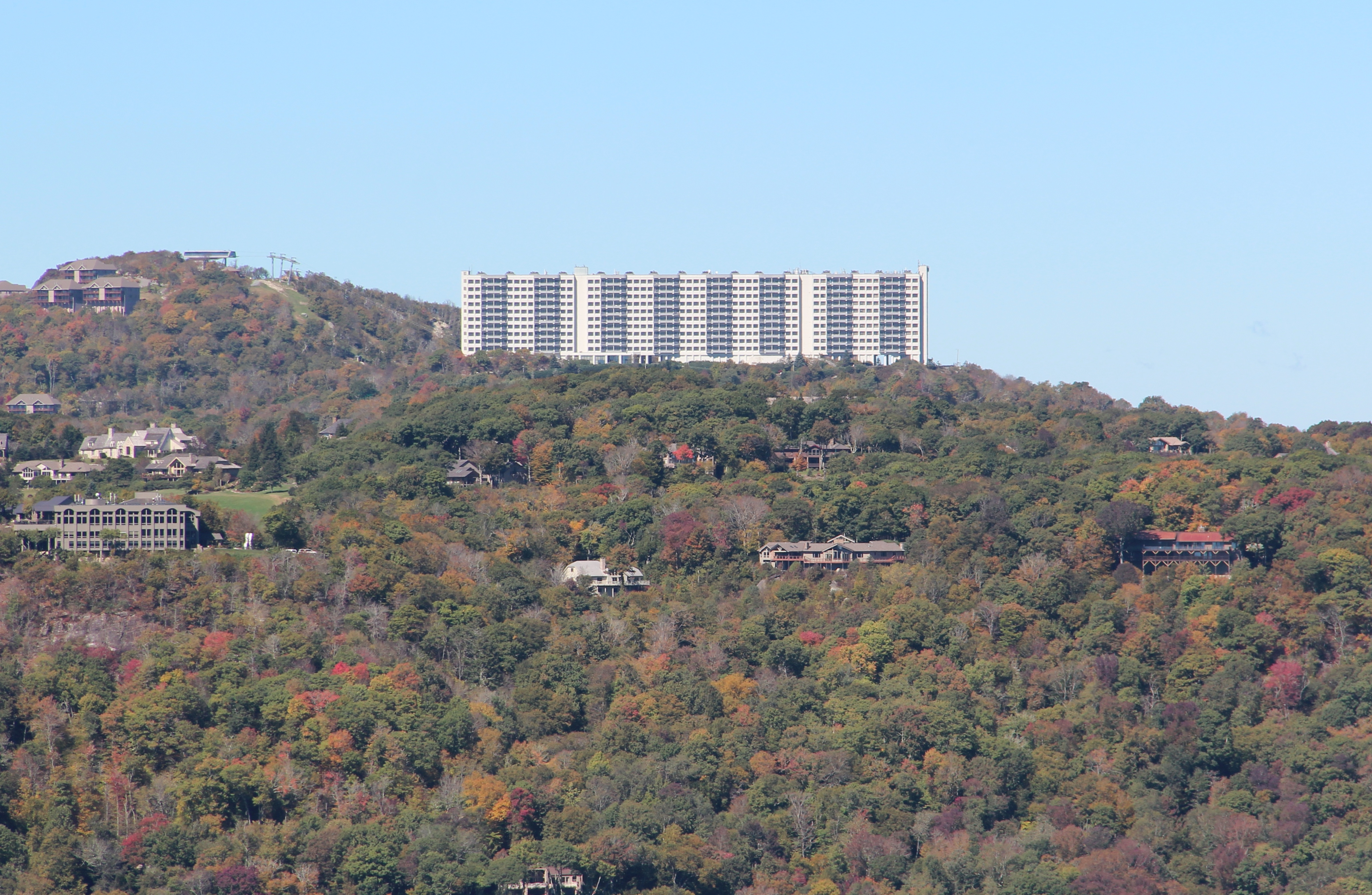
The Citadel, viewed from Grandfather Mountain

In 1983, the Citadel was built on what is known as Sugar Top. The condominium complex, which can be seen from miles away, became what many consider an eyesore. Because of many complaints by locals and visitors, the state of North Carolina passed the Mountain Ridge Protection Act of 1983 so that nothing similar can be built again. Many students of nearby Appalachian State University in Boone, NC refer to the building as "The Sugar Cube" because of its unnaturally awkward square shape on the horizon.
