= Sugar Mountain, North Carolina =

- Village
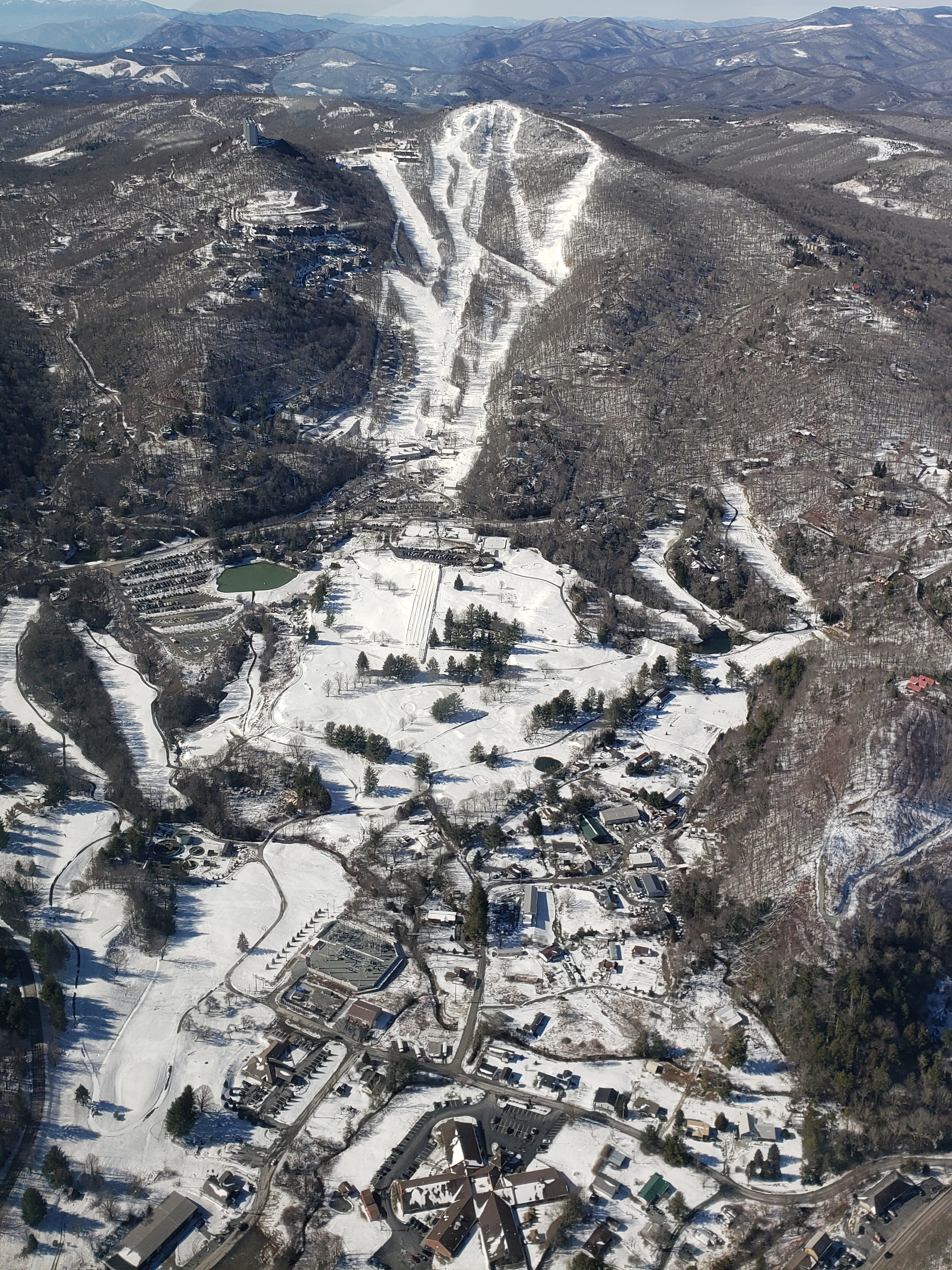
- Aerial view of Sugar Mountain

- Seal Logo

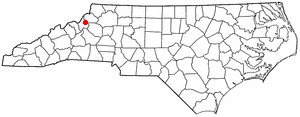
- Location of Sugar Mountain, North Carolina
- Coordinates: 36°07′35″N 81°51′53″W
- Country: United States
- State: North Carolina
- County: Avery
- Incorporated: 1989
- Named for: Sugar Mountain

Government
  - Type: Mayor-council
  - Mayor: Gunther Jochl

Area
  - Total: 2.46 sq mi (6.37 km^{2})
  - Land: 2.46 sq mi (6.37 km^{2})
  - Water: 0 sq mi (0.00 km^{2})
- Elevation: 4,557 ft (1,389 m)

Population (2020)
  - Total: 371
  - Density: 150.9/sq mi (58.26/km^{2})
- Time zone: UTC-5 (Eastern (EST))
  - Summer (DST): UTC-4 (EDT)
- ZIP code: 28604
- Area code: 828
- FIPS code: 37-65530
- GNIS feature ID: 2407555
- Website: seesugar.com

Sugar Mountain is a village in Avery County, North Carolina, United States. The village is located on Sugar Mountain's north slope. The population was 371 at the 2020 census.

== Geography ==
According to the United States Census Bureau, the village has a total area of 2.4 square miles (6.2 km^{2}), all land. It is located next to Sugar Mountain Ski Area, one of several ski areas in this section of North Carolina.

== Climate ==
Sugar Mountain has a humid continental climate (Dfb) with warm summers and moderately cold winters, though very cold by North Carolina standards. Due to the village's high elevation, one can experiences all four seasons in equal length on the mountain.

Climate data for Sugar Mountain
Month	Jan	Feb	Mar	Apr	May	Jun	Jul	Aug	Sep	Oct	Nov	Dec	Year
Mean daily maximum °F (°C)	39.2 (4.0)	41.5 (5.3)	49.8 (9.9)	58.3 (14.6)	66 (19)	71.8 (22.1)	74.8 (23.8)	73.9 (23.3)	68.7 (20.4)	59.9 (15.5)	51.1 (10.6)	42.6 (5.9)	58.1 (14.5)
Daily mean °F (°C)	29.3 (−1.5)	31.5 (−0.3)	39.2 (4.0)	47.3 (8.5)	55.4 (13.0)	61.9 (16.6)	65.3 (18.5)	64.4 (18.0)	58.8 (14.9)	49.1 (9.5)	40.8 (4.9)	32.9 (0.5)	48.0 (8.9)
Mean daily minimum °F (°C)	19.6 (−6.9)	21.4 (−5.9)	28.8 (−1.8)	36.5 (2.5)	45 (7)	52 (11)	55.8 (13.2)	54.9 (12.7)	49.1 (9.5)	38.5 (3.6)	30.6 (−0.8)	32.9 (0.5)	38.8 (3.7)
Average precipitation inches (mm)	4.17 (106)	4.45 (113)	5.51 (140)	4.80 (122)	5.51 (140)	5.39 (137)	5.63 (143)	5.43 (138)	5.08 (129)	4.80 (122)	4.53 (115)	4.05 (103)	59.35 (1,508)
Average snowfall inches (cm)	10.9 (28)	11.8 (30)	5.8 (15)	4.1 (10)	0.2 (0.51)	0 (0)	0 (0)	0 (0)	0 (0)	0.3 (0.76)	2 (5.1)	6.5 (17)	41.6 (106.37)
Average snowy days	5.2	4.7	2.7	1.6	0.1	0	0	0	0	0.2	1	3.8	19.3

== Demographics ==
Historical population
Census	Pop.	Note	%±
1990	132		—
2000	226		71.2%
2010	198		−12.4%
2020	371		87.4%
U.S. Decennial Census

At the 2000 census there were 226 people, 121 households, and 61 families in the village. The population density was 92.6 inhabitants per square mile (35.8/km^{2}). There were 1,212 housing units at an average density of 496.8 per square mile (191.8/km^{2}). The racial makeup of the village was 99.12% White, 0.44% Pacific Islander, and 0.44% from two or more races. The mountain's name comes from people who thought the snow on the ground to look like grains of sugar. They were the first settlers here and the name stuck. Another reason for the name Sugar Mountain is because in 1900 a majority of the inhabitants worked in a sugar factory. An old tale said that one night in late January, the sugar in the factory was leaking out of the building and caused a layer of white grains that looked just like snow.

Of the 121 households 7.4% had children under the age of 18 living with them, 43.0% were married couples living together, 4.1% had a female householder with no husband present, and 48.8% were non-families. 35.5% of households were one person and 8.3% were one person aged 65 or older. The average household size was 1.87 and the average family size was 2.32.

The age distribution was 6.2% under the age of 18, 18.6% from 18 to 24, 27.9% from 25 to 44, 28.3% from 45 to 64, and 19.0% 65 or older. The median age was 43 years. For every 100 females, there were 113.2 males. For every 100 females age 18 and over, there were 114.1 males.

The median household income was $37,500 and the median family income was $50,208. Males had a median income of $26,528 versus $30,833 for females. The per capita income for the village was $27,063. About 6.8% of families and 21.0% of the population were below the poverty line, including none of those under the age of eighteen and 12.1% of those sixty five or over.
