= Pineola, North Carolina =

Pineola
- Unincorporated community
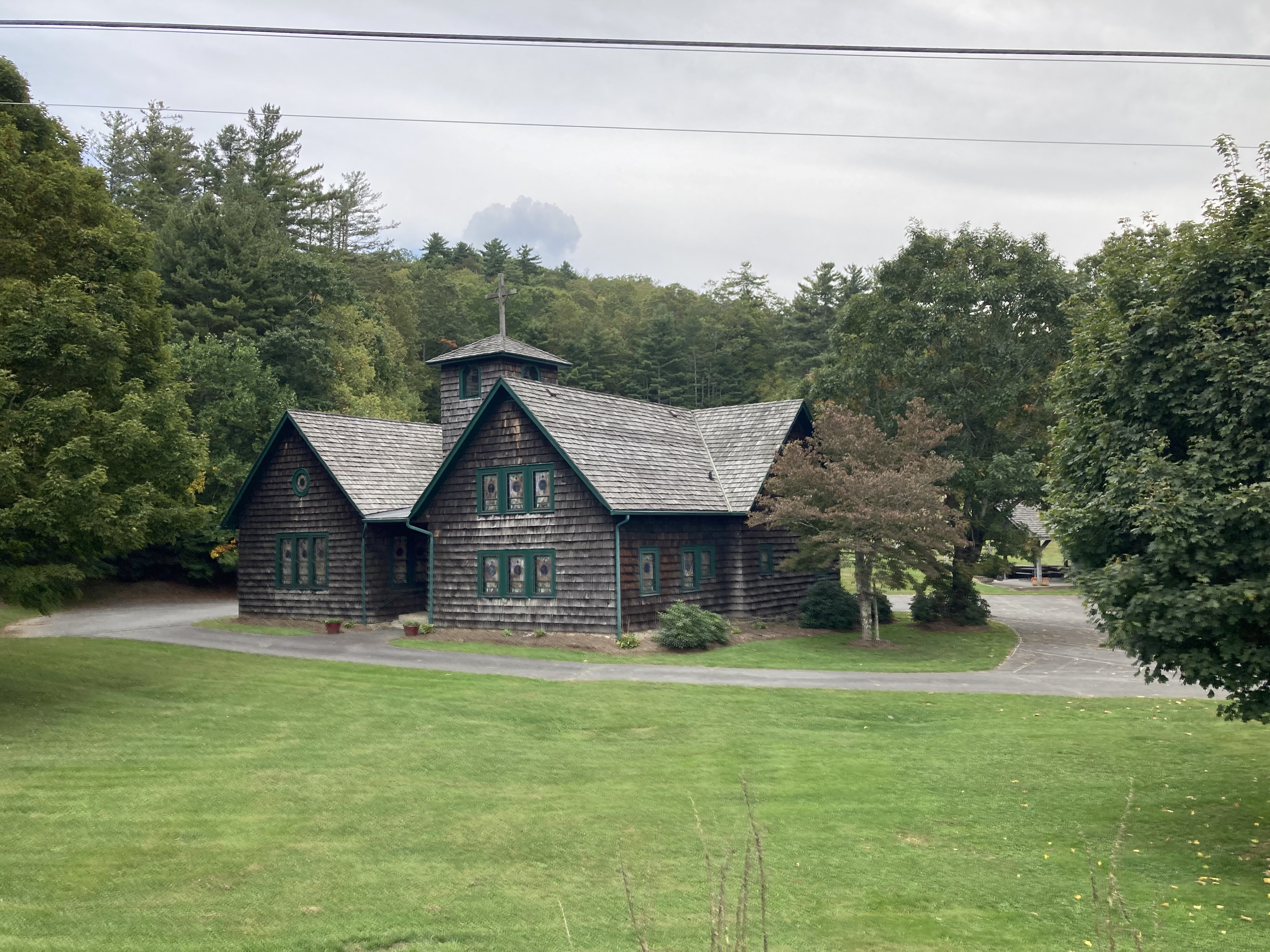
- The Pineola Presbyterian Church (1927) in Pineola.

- Location within the state of North Carolina
- Coordinates: 36°01′42″N 81°53′29″W
- Country: United States
- State: North Carolina
- County: Avery County
- Named for: Ola Penland
- Elevation: 3,550 ft (1,082 m)
- Time zone: UTC-5 (Eastern (EST))
  - Summer (DST): UTC-4 (EDT)
- ZIP code: 28662
- Area code: 828
- GNIS feature ID: 1021936

Pineola is an unincorporated community in Avery County, North Carolina, United States. Its boundaries roughly span a three-mile radius, from the intersection of U.S. Route 221 and North Carolina Highway 181.

Pineola is the site of several businesses, including a concrete plant (Loven Ready Mix), a building supply and lumber company (Loven Lumber Company), a Campground (Down by the River Campground), an asphalt plant, a general store (Lowrey's), a sawmill (Loven Lumber Company), a boutique Salon (Timothy and Company), and a hotel (The Pineola Inn). In the center of Pineola is the hundred plus years old Pineola Presbyterian Church, which is an architectural landmark and historically significant to Avery County. A number of choose and cut Christmas tree farms dot the community for seasonal visitors. The Linville River flows through the area, and is impounded by a dam into what was the original Anthony Lake for several resort communities. The Blue Ridge Parkway passes through the southeast portion of the area.

== History ==
In 1911, a post office was established in the area known as "Saginaw". On July 21, 1914, the community was renamed Pineola after the pine trees growing in the vicinity and Ola Penland, daughter of a local hotel keeper.

During the early 1900s, Pineola was the site of a large logging operation and sawmill, owned by the W.M. Ritter Company. The East Tennessee and Western North Carolina Railroad ("Tweetsie") operated in the community until 1939, when it received permission from the Interstate Commerce Commission to abandon Pineola.

== See also ==
- Brown Mountain
- Grandfather Mountain
- Grandmother Mountain
