= Seven Devils, North Carolina =

- Town
- Seal Logo

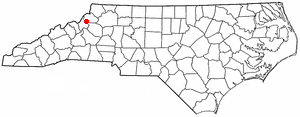
- Location of Seven Devils, North Carolina
- Coordinates: 36°08′57″N 81°48′43″W
- Country: United States
- State: North Carolina
- Counties: Watauga, Avery
- Incorporated: 1979

Government
  - Type: Council–manager
  - Mayor: Larry Fontaine

Area
  - Total: 2.23 sq mi (5.78 km^{2})
  - Land: 2.22 sq mi (5.74 km^{2})
  - Water: 0.015 sq mi (0.04 km^{2})
- Elevation: 3,963 ft (1,208 m)

Population (2020)
  - Total: 313
  - Density: 141.2/sq mi (54.51/km^{2})
- Time zone: UTC-5 (Eastern (EST))
  - Summer (DST): UTC-4 (EDT)
- ZIP code: 28604
- Area code: 828
- FIPS code: 37-60505
- GNIS feature ID: 2407313
- Website: www.sevendevilsnc.gov

Seven Devils is a town in Avery and Watauga counties in the U.S. state of North Carolina. The population was 313 at the 2020 census. The town, which is located in the Appalachian Mountains, is best known as the site of a popular wintertime tubing resort known as Hawksnest, which claims it has the largest tubing facility on the East Coast, and some of the town's year round residents earn their living at the resort. Many others are retirees. Developed in the 1970s as a vacation home community, Seven Devils is home mostly to seasonal residents.

== History ==
In the mid-1960s, seven men from the Winston-Salem area established the unincorporated community of Seven Devils with the vision of creating a recreational resort. The seven founders included four brothers, Herbert Reynolds, Frank Reynolds, Galloway Reynolds and Dan Reynolds, and their partners George Kempton, Ray Smith and Gardner Gidley. They wanted a unique name to attract visitors and decided upon Seven Devils based on a combination of factors. There were seven founders and seven distinct peaks from the ridge line of the Blue Ridge Parkway that viewed the area, and locals often said that "the wind blows like the devil up there in the winter time."

In its early days, Seven Devils featured a campground, swimming lake, horseback riding trails and stables, rental cottages and a general store. The Seven Devils Golf & Ski Resort opened in December 1968, attracting more visitors and residents. The town of Seven Devils was incorporated on June 30, 1979.

In the early 1980s, Jon Reynolds assumed ownership of the ski area and changed its name to Ski Hawksnest. The resort soon became a favorite among locals and college students, offering low ticket prices, a bar with live music, and a weekend night skiing session called "Nighthawk" that ran from 10pm to 4am. In 1993, Leonard Cottom, who owned the neighboring Hanging Rock Golf and Country Club, purchased the ski area, changing the name to Hawksnest Golf & Ski Resort. In 2008, under the ownership of Lenny Cottom, Hawksnest closed for skiing to focus on snow tubing and ziplining.

== Geography ==
According to the United States Census Bureau, the town has a total area of 2.1 square miles (5.3 km^{2}), of which 2.0 square miles (5.3 km^{2}) is land and 0.49% is water.

== Demographics ==
Historical population
| Census | Pop. | Note | %± |
|---|---|---|---|
| 1980 | 54 | | — |
| 1990 | 117 | | 116.7% |
| 2000 | 129 | | 10.3% |
| 2010 | 192 | | 48.8% |
| 2020 | 313 | | 63.0% |
U.S. Decennial Census

As of the census of 2000, there were 129 people, 62 households, and 40 families residing in the town. The population density was 63.0 inhabitants per square mile (24.3/km^{2}). There were 345 housing units at an average density of 168.6 per square mile (65.1/km^{2}). The racial makeup of the town was 98.45% White, and 1.55% from two or more races. Hispanic or Latino of any race were 0.78% of the population.

There were 62 households, out of which 21.0% had children under the age of 18 living with them, 61.3% were married couples living together, 1.6% had a female householder with no husband present, and 33.9% were non-families. 25.8% of all households were made up of individuals, and 6.5% had someone living alone who was 65 years of age or older. The average household size was 2.08 and the average family size was 2.46.

In the town, the population was spread out, with 14.0% under the age of 18, 7.8% from 18 to 24, 32.6% from 25 to 44, 29.5% from 45 to 64, and 16.3% who were 65 years of age or older. The median age was 43 years. For every 100 females, there were 111.5 males. For every 100 females age 18 and over, there were 101.8 males.

The median income for a household in the town was $38,750, and the median income for a family was $62,813. Males had a median income of $35,417 versus $38,125 for females. The per capita income for the town was $19,801. There were 21.6% of families and 20.5% of the population living below the poverty line, including 26.3% of those under eighteen and none of those over 64.
