= Avery County, North Carolina =

County in North Carolina, United States

- County
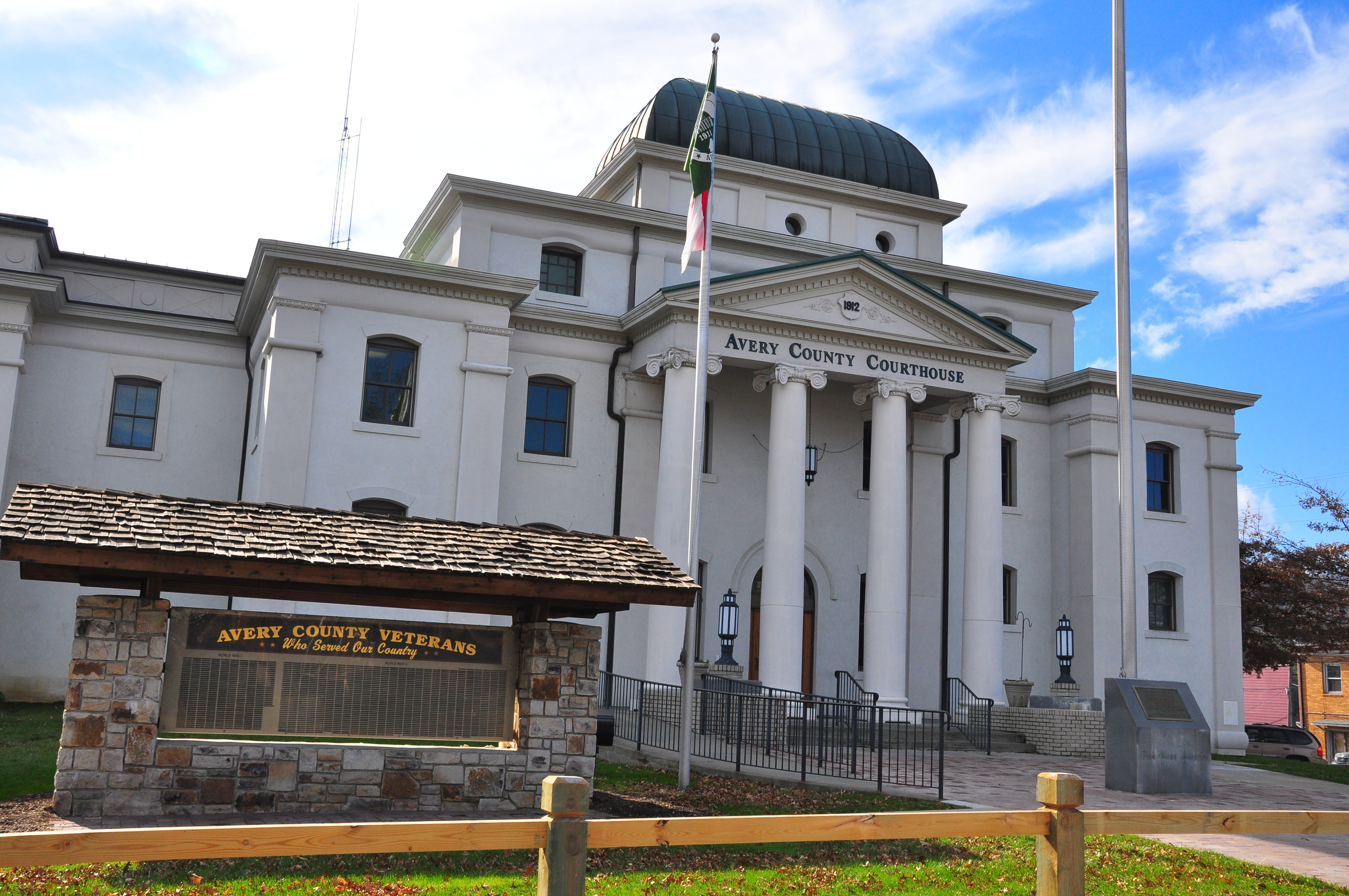
- Avery County Courthouse

- Flag Seal Logo
- Motto: "Together... We Are Avery County."
- Location within the U.S. state of North Carolina
- Interactive map of Avery County, North Carolina
- Coordinates: 36.07°N 81.92°W
- Country: United States
- State: North Carolina
- Founded: 1911
- Named for: Waightstill Avery
- Seat: Newland
- Largest community: Banner Elk

Area
  - Total: 247.51 sq mi (641.0 km^{2})
  - Land: 247.34 sq mi (640.6 km^{2})
  - Water: 0.17 sq mi (0.44 km^{2}) 0.06%

Population (2020)
  - Total: 17,806
  - Estimate (2025): 18,110 ▲
  - Density: 72.04/sq mi (27.81/km^{2})
- Time zone: UTC−5 (Eastern)
  - Summer (DST): UTC−4 (EDT)
- Congressional district: 11th
- Website: www.averycountync.gov

Avery County is a county located in the U.S. state of North Carolina. As of the 2020 census, the population was 17,806. The county seat is Newland. The county seat was initially established in Elk Park when the county was first formed, but was moved to Newland upon completion of the courthouse in 1912. Founded in 1911, it is the youngest of North Carolina's 100 counties.

== History ==
The county is the newest of North Carolina's 100 counties. It was formed in 1911 from parts of Caldwell County, Mitchell County, and Watauga County. It was named for Waightstill Avery, a colonel in the American Revolutionary War and the first Attorney General of North Carolina (1777–1779).

It is often noted for the large amount of Christmas trees that the county produces. The county seat was originally in the town of Elk Park, which was then the largest town in the county, located on the county's north end, on the Tennessee line. Upon completion of the county's courthouse in 1912, the seat was moved to the central location of what was then an unincorporated area known as Fields of Toe, for the meadows along the head of the Toe River, in what is now the incorporated Town of Newland. The town was so named for then Lt. Gov. William Newland, an influential Democrat, who helped garner support in the then heavily Democratic legislature in Raleigh, for Avery County, an overwhelmingly pro-Union Republican area, becoming the state's 100th and final county.

According to local legend, Elk Park citizens were upset at the decision to move of the county seat from their town, and they refused to give up the books. The then-sheriff, like all county officials, was a Democrat and an interim appointee of the Democratic governor in Raleigh, who would hold office from July 1, 1911, until the next election cycle in late 1912, when the almost all-Republican electorate would undoubtedly vote in all Republicans as local officials. The sheriff was leery of confronting the irate local Elk Park citizens, so his wife baked cookies and had their pastor deliver them as a peace offering. The citizens then cheerfully handed over the books, which were sent to the new offices at the new courthouse in Newland.

== Geography ==
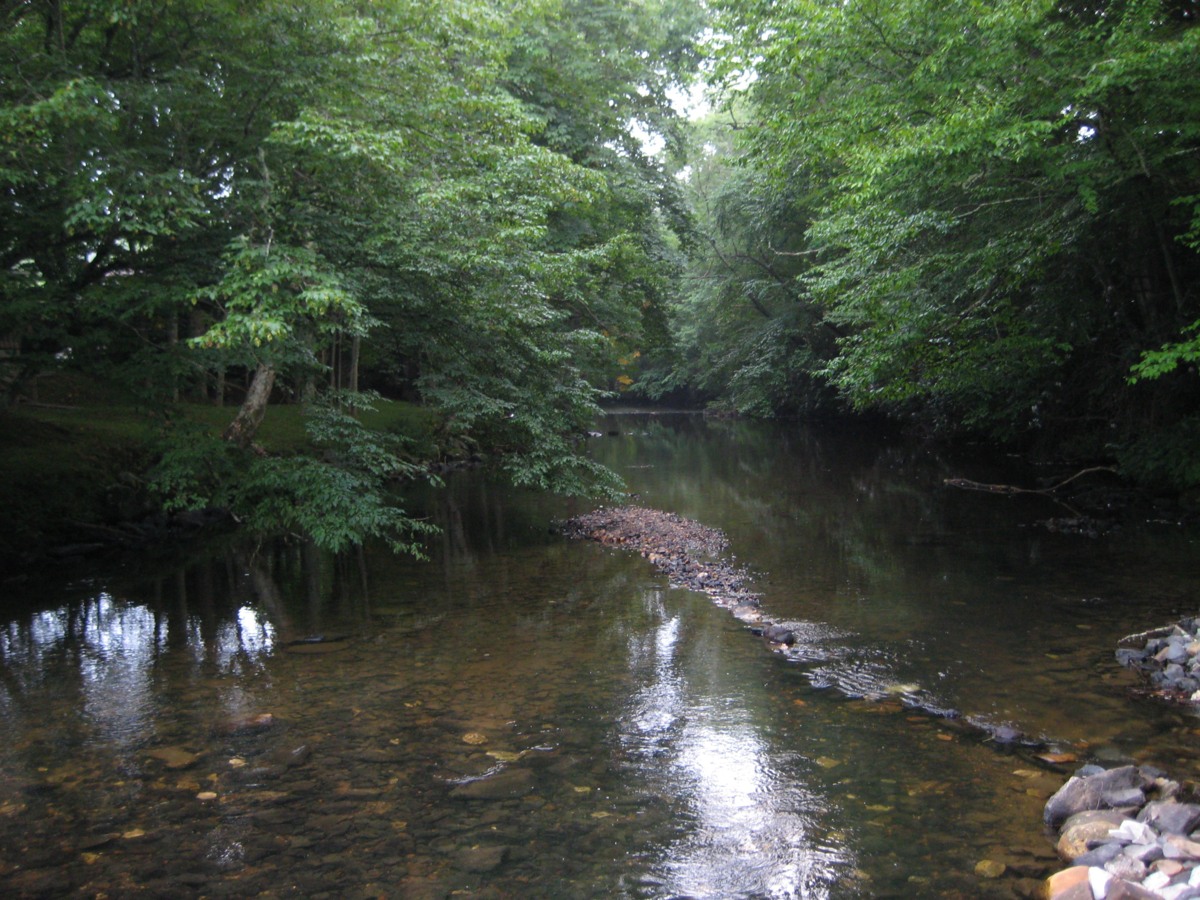
Linville River, between Linville and Pineola

According to the U.S. Census Bureau, the county has a total area of 247.51 square miles (641.0 km^{2}), of which 247.34 square miles (640.6 km^{2}) is land and 0.17 square miles (0.44 km^{2}) (0.06%) is water.

Avery County is extremely rural and mountainous with all of the county's terrain located within the Appalachian Mountains range; with a mean altitude of 3,510 feet or 1,070 metres it is the second-highest county east of the Mississippi behind nearby Haywood County. The highest point in the county is Grassy Ridge Bald, 6,165 feet (1,879 m) above sea level. Most of Grandfather Mountain, whose highest point is 5,946 feet (1,812 m) Calloway Peak on the tri-point bordering Watauga and Caldwell Counties, is within Avery County. At 5,526 feet or 1,684 metres, Beech Mountain (also shared with Watauga County) is the highest incorporated community east of the Mississippi River, while at 3,606 feet or 1,099 metres Newland is the highest county seat in the Eastern United States.

=== National protected areas ===
- Blue Ridge Parkway (part)
- Pisgah National Forest (part)

=== State and local protected areas ===
- Bear Paw State Natural Area
- Gill State Forest (part)
- Grandfather Mountain State Park (part)
- Pineola Bog State Natural Area
- Pisgah National Forest Game Land (part)
- Pisgah (WRC) Game Land (part)
- Sugar Mountain Bog State Natural Area
- Yellow Mountain State Natural Area (part)

=== Major water bodies ===
- Buckeye Creek
- Cranberry Creek
- Little Horse Creek
- Linville River
- Mill Creek
- North Harper Creek
- North Toe River
- Watauga River

=== Adjacent counties ===
- Johnson County, Tennessee - north
- Watauga County - northeast
- Caldwell County - east
- Burke County - south
- McDowell County - south
- Mitchell County - west
- Carter County, Tennessee - northwest

== Demographics ==
Historical population
Census	Pop.	Note	%±
1920	10,335		—
1930	11,803		14.2%
1940	13,561		14.9%
1950	13,352		−1.5%
1960	12,009		−10.1%
1970	12,655		5.4%
1980	14,409		13.9%
1990	14,867		3.2%
2000	17,167		15.5%
2010	17,797		3.7%
2020	17,806		0.1%
2025 (est.)	18,110	▲	1.7%
U.S. Decennial Census; 1790–1960 1900–1990; 1990–2000 2010 2020

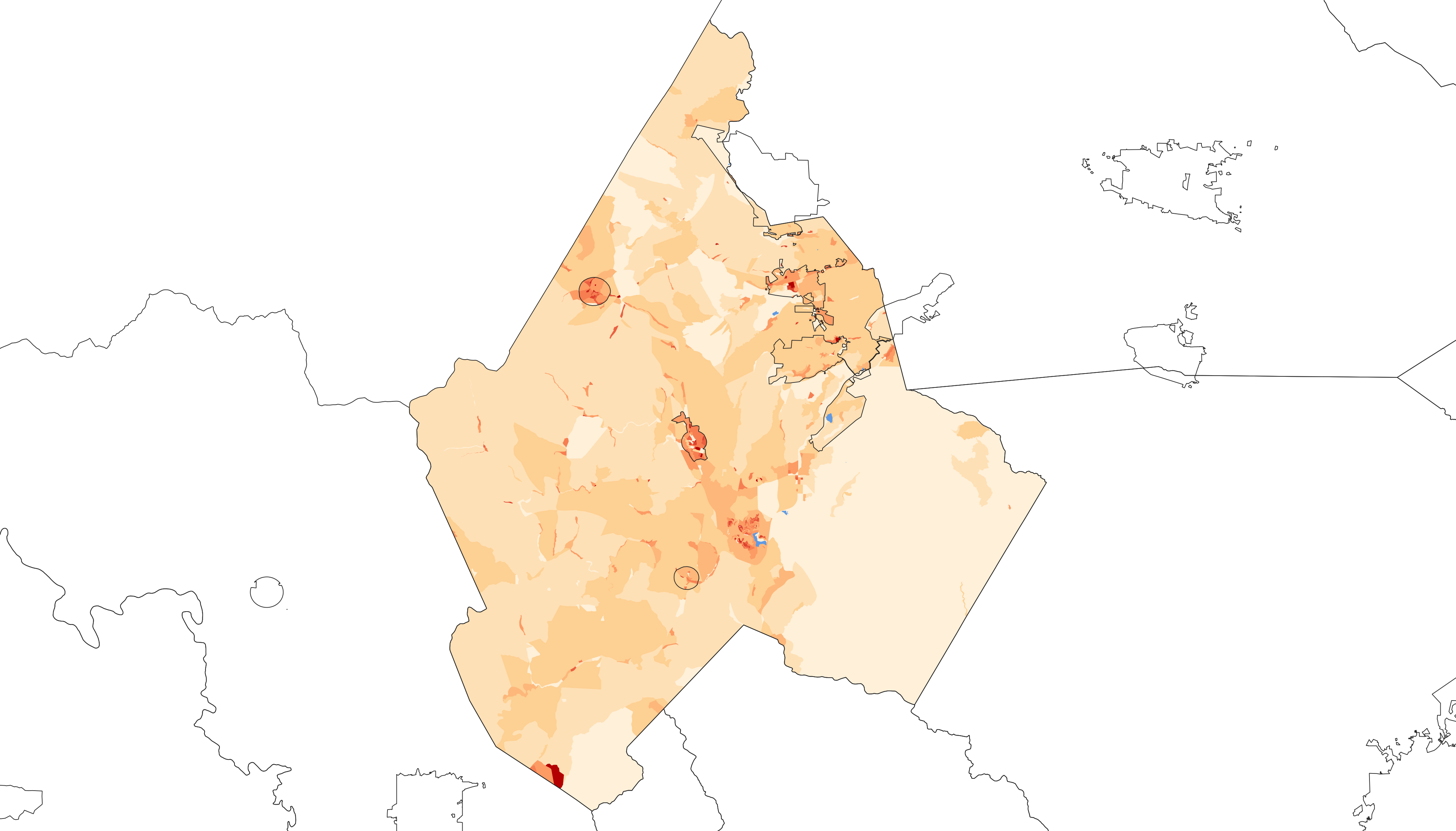
2020 population density of Avery County NC by census block

=== Racial and ethnic composition ===
Avery County, North Carolina – Racial and ethnic composition Note: the US Census treats Hispanic/Latino as an ethnic category. This table excludes Latinos from the racial categories and assigns them to a separate category. Hispanics/Latinos may be of any race.
Race / Ethnicity (NH = Non-Hispanic)	Pop 1980	Pop 1990	Pop 2000	Pop 2010	Pop 2020	% 1980	% 1990	% 2000	% 2010	% 2020
White alone (NH)	14,125	14,554	15,957	16,029	15,549	98.03%	97.89%	92.95%	90.07%	87.32%
Black or African American alone (NH)	136	156	598	706	649	0.94%	1.05%	3.48%	3.97%	3.64%
Native American or Alaska Native alone (NH)	33	18	35	66	58	0.23%	0.12%	0.20%	0.37%	0.33%
Asian alone (NH)	5	20	33	56	56	0.03%	0.13%	0.19%	0.31%	0.31%
Native Hawaiian or Pacific Islander alone (NH)	x	x	7	5	1	x	x	0.04%	0.03%	0.01%
Other race alone (NH)	0	1	12	19	44	0.00%	0.01%	0.07%	0.11%	0.25%
Mixed race or Multiracial (NH)	x	x	112	119	462	x	x	0.65%	0.67%	2.59%
Hispanic or Latino (any race)	110	118	413	797	987	0.76%	0.79%	2.41%	4.48%	5.54%
Total	14,409	14,867	17,167	17,797	17,806	100.00%	100.00%	100.00%	100.00%	100.00%

=== 2020 census ===
As of the 2020 census, there were 17,806 people, 6,860 households, and 4,319 families residing in the county, and the median age was 47.0 years.

15.2% of residents were under the age of 18 and 24.5% of residents were 65 years of age or older. For every 100 females there were 117.1 males, and for every 100 females age 18 and over there were 119.5 males age 18 and over.

The racial makeup of the county was 88.4% White, 3.7% Black or African American, 0.5% American Indian and Alaska Native, 0.4% Asian, <0.1% Native Hawaiian and Pacific Islander, 3.1% from some other race, and 3.9% from two or more races. Hispanic or Latino residents of any race comprised 5.5% of the population.

<0.1% of residents lived in urban areas, while 100.0% lived in rural areas.

There were 6,860 households in the county, of which 22.5% had children under the age of 18 living in them. Of all households, 50.7% were married-couple households, 18.9% were households with a male householder and no spouse or partner present, and 25.7% were households with a female householder and no spouse or partner present. About 31.0% of all households were made up of individuals and 16.0% had someone living alone who was 65 years of age or older.

There were 13,827 housing units, of which 50.4% were vacant. Among occupied housing units, 77.1% were owner-occupied and 22.9% were renter-occupied. The homeowner vacancy rate was 2.4% and the rental vacancy rate was 24.5%.

=== 2000 census ===
At the 2000 census, there were 17,167 people, 6,532 households, and 4,546 families residing in the county. The population density was 70 people per square mile (27 people/km^{2}). There were 11,911 housing units at an average density of 48 units per square mile (19 units/km^{2}). The racial makeup of the county was 93.95% White, 3.48% Black or African American, 0.34% Native American, 0.19% Asian, 0.04% Pacific Islander, 1.28% from other races, and 0.71% from two or more races. 2.41% of the population were Hispanic or Latino of any race.

There were 6,532 households, out of which 27.10% had children under the age of 18 living with them, 57.10% were married couples living together, 9.10% had a female householder with no husband present, and 30.40% were non-families. 26.60% of all households were made up of individuals, and 11.00% had someone living alone who was 65 years of age or older. The average household size was 2.34 and the average family size was 2.82.

In the county, the population was spread out, with 19.40% under the age of 18, 10.30% from 18 to 24, 30.10% from 25 to 44, 24.40% from 45 to 64, and 15.70% who were 65 years of age or older. The median age of Avery County is aging, with it at 38 years. For every 100 females there were 111.80 males. For every 100 females age 18 and over, there were 112.90 males.

The median income for a household in the county was $30,627, and the median income for a family was $37,454. Males had a median income of $25,983 versus $21,652 for females. The per capita income for the county was $15,176. About 10.90% of families and 15.30% of the population were below the poverty line, including 19.30% of those under age 18 and 19.00% of those age 65 or over.

== Law and government ==
The county is governed by a five-member Avery County Board of Commissioners who are elected to two or four-year terms, depending on the number and percentage of votes they receive when elected. The current members, as of 2024, are Chairman Tim Phillips, Dennis Aldridge, Robert Burleson, Wood Hall Young Jr. and Junior Benfield.

Avery County is a member of the regional High Country Council of Governments. The county commissioners appoint a county manager to oversee day-to-day operations of county government of all departments that are not controlled by an elected head. The current county manager position is filled by Phillip Barrier, Jr. The current finance officer position is filled Caleb Hogan. The Board of Commissioners also appoints qualified citizen applicants to various boards and committees, such as business and economic development, social service board, library board, airport board, fire commission Mayland Community College Board, ad hoc and others.

The county seat in Newland is the highest county seat east of the Mississippi River, as is the courthouse, located on a pinnacle in the center of town, at an elevation of over 3,600 feet (1,100 m). The county's elected Soil and Water Board District supervisors are Bill Beutell, David Banner, Ann Coleman, and Jack Wiseman.

The county also has a non-partisan elected school board to oversee the countywide school district. The current school board chairman is John Greene, with retired teacher Kathy Aldridge serving as vice chair. Other school board members are retired Avery High School Principal Patricia Edwards. The county's superintendent of schools is Dr. Dan Brigman. The School Board is located on NC 194 near the Newland city limits. It also houses the school bus garage, support staff and other school system administrative offices.

=== Government buildings ===
Overlooking Avery Square is the historic 1912 Avery County Courthouse. The square, includes monuments to fallen peace officers, fallen firefighters and as of 2016, a large veteran's memorial. The courthouse was remodeled in 1996 and again in 2014, to add more office space and a second smaller courtroom. The courthouse is located on Shultz Circle and Glenn Hicks Lane, which was renamed from Jail Street, in honor of Avery Sheriff's Deputy Lt. Glenn H. Hicks, who was murdered in the line of duty in 2003.

The courthouse also houses local office of the North Carolina Probation and Parole Division, judges offices and chambers, district attorney's sub-office, the county map office, tax office, inspection office, register of deeds, clerk of superior court, guardian ad litem and North Carolina juvenile justice department. Connected to the courthouse is the sheriff's office and the county jail, an elections office, county 911 emergency dispatch center and magistrate's courtroom.

The county administrative building provides work space for the county manager and many other county offices such as social services, payroll, finance, veterans services, fire marshal, emergency management, waste management, technology and personnel. In 1997, a second courtroom and a small magistrate's courtroom at the courthouse was created.

The Avery County Sheriff's Office provides law enforcement protection to the entire county. The county has no police department. The Sheriff also provides security to the courts and courthouse, serves civil orders of the courts and operates the jail complex.

Other county services includes a 911 emergency dispatch center that provides service to all county law enforcement (Sheriff's office, 6 town police departments and three company police agencies, plus communications support to the NC Highway Patrol Troopers, NC Wildlife officers, state alcohol agents and state park rangers assigned locally), fire, EMS and rescue services in the county. The county building also houses county fire marshal and emergency management offices, a veteran's services office and an office of economic development, along with staffed trash collection sites throughout the county and a landfill.

== Politics ==
Owing to its Appalachian highland location, rural character, and powerful Unionist sympathies from the Civil War (1861-1865), Avery County has continually voted overwhelmingly Republican in Presidential elections, even during the Solid South Democratic era. Since the county's formation in 1911, no Democratic presidential candidate has obtained forty percent of the county's vote, and only Lyndon Johnson in 1964 and Jimmy Carter in 1976 have received so much as thirty percent. An illustration of Avery County's rock-ribbed Republicanism can be seen in 1936 when Alf Landon won the county by 55.96 percentage points, making it Landon's fifth-strongest county in the nation despite Landon losing North Carolina to Franklin Roosevelt by 46.80 percent.

United States presidential election results for Avery County, North Carolina
Year	Republican		Democratic		Third party(ies)	
Year	No.	%	No.	%	No.	%
1912	138	10.56%	217	16.60%	952	72.84%
1916	1,158	76.18%	360	23.68%	2	0.13%
1920	2,503	86.31%	397	13.69%	0	0.00%
1924	2,189	85.51%	357	13.95%	14	0.55%
1928	3,273	89.35%	390	10.65%	0	0.00%
1932	2,833	72.64%	1,045	26.79%	22	0.56%
1936	2,971	77.98%	839	22.02%	0	0.00%
1940	2,944	71.15%	1,194	28.85%	0	0.00%
1944	3,178	79.13%	838	20.87%	0	0.00%
1948	2,995	74.73%	933	23.28%	80	2.00%
1952	3,725	79.44%	964	20.56%	0	0.00%
1956	4,009	80.53%	969	19.47%	0	0.00%
1960	4,176	79.95%	1,047	20.05%	0	0.00%
1964	2,656	63.56%	1,523	36.44%	0	0.00%
1968	3,197	70.76%	631	13.97%	690	15.27%
1972	3,510	83.99%	627	15.00%	42	1.01%
1976	3,085	61.80%	1,869	37.44%	38	0.76%
1980	3,480	67.16%	1,527	29.47%	175	3.38%
1984	4,702	79.88%	1,159	19.69%	25	0.42%
1988	4,277	75.33%	1,367	24.08%	34	0.60%
1992	3,895	57.39%	1,755	25.86%	1,137	16.75%
1996	3,870	62.83%	1,586	25.75%	703	11.41%
2000	4,956	74.04%	1,686	25.19%	52	0.78%
2004	5,678	75.47%	1,805	23.99%	41	0.54%
2008	5,681	71.52%	2,178	27.42%	84	1.06%
2012	5,766	74.31%	1,882	24.26%	111	1.43%
2016	6,298	76.35%	1,689	20.48%	262	3.18%
2020	7,172	75.83%	2,191	23.17%	95	1.00%
2024	7,181	75.68%	2,220	23.40%	88	0.93%

Avery County is represented in the 47th district of the North Carolina Senate, represented by Republican Ralph Hise, and the 85th district of the North Carolina House of Representatives, represented by Republican Dudley Greene.

== Economy ==
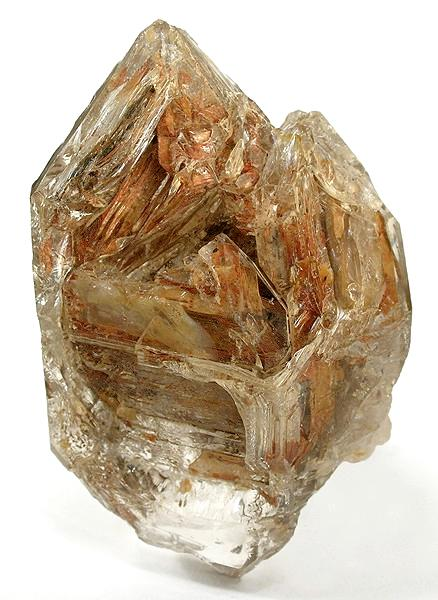
Unusual, doubly terminated quartz crystal with clay inclusions, found in Avery County, which is well known for producing quartz specimens.

The county contains local attractions such as Grandfather Mountain, Grandfather Mountain State Park, Linville Gorge Wilderness, Linville Falls, Pisgah National Forest and the Blue Ridge Parkway, which all attract large numbers of visitors. In October, the annual "Wooly Worm" festival at the old school in downtown Banner Elk draws world visitors who come to see caterpillar races that locals happily claim can predict the severity of coming winters based on the fur coats of the worms. The Grandfather Mountain Highland Games is held each year the first full weekend after July 4 and is one of the largest Scottish gatherings outside Scotland and features bagpipes, bands, Scottish food, music, authentic clothing and games such as log and caber toss and use of dogs in sheep herding. Also in October is Oz Days at the former Land of Oz theme park on Beech Mountain in the fall also attracts visitors who love the legacy of the famous Judy Garland movie "The Wizard of Oz" based on Frank Baum's famous book. Oktoberfest on Sugar Mountain and Beech Mountain also in October draw large crowds and the annual Music Festival in Newland on July 4 also attracts many visitors.

Ski Resorts are immensely popular tourist destinations in the cold winter months when snowfall and man-made snow create ideal skiing conditions. Sugar Mountain Ski Resort, located in Sugar Mountain, and Ski Beech Resort, located in Beech Mountain, provide multiple winter actives including skiing, snowboarding, snow tubing and ice skating. Hawks Nest Tubing Resort, located in Seven Devils offers snow tubing.

Second homes, gated communities, condominiums, rental properties, hotel-motel lodging, bed and breakfasts, campgrounds and real estate in general all are critically important sources of jobs, income and tax revenue. The brilliant fall colors or the foliage of the surrounding mountains, winter sports, mountain bicycling, hiking, horseback riding, warm weather camping, hiking, wildlife viewing, hunting and searching for geological finds all make for a year-round tourism-generated and regular real estate market.

Major Employers: The State of North Carolina is the largest employer in the county. It operates a forestry center, DOT office, State Highway Patrol office, state agriculture extension office, probation/parole office, alcohol law enforcement office, a state park service office and two prisons in lower Avery County on the Mitchell County border. Those side-by-side facilities are Mountain View and Avery-Mitchell. A third prison facility, the BRIDGE Unit, was a novel project to use non-violent, first-time youthful felony offenders to work on state lands and fight forest fires as "smoke jumpers." It was closed in the late 1990s and torn down. Other major employers are: the Avery County School System, Mayland Community College, Cannon Memorial Hospital, Lees-McRae College, Avery County government, Lowes Foods, Unimin, Beech and Sugar Mountain Resorts, the YMCA of Avery County, and various large tree farms and mining operations which are also important local employers.

The Avery Fairgrounds is located on Vale Road, just outside the Newland city limits. It is funded both by allocated county funds and private funding and controlled by a fair board. The Avery County Agricultural and Horticultural Fair has been an annual event in early September of each year and draws huge crowds to the site for rides, displays and other events.

Avery County is one of 420 counties and eight independent cities that fall into the Appalachian Region as defined by the US Government's Appalachian Regional Council (ARC). ARC was founded by President Lyndon B. Johnson in 1965 to address poverty in the 13 Eastern states of Appalachia. Avery is listed as "Transitional" by the ARC. Based on 2006 statistics from the US Government, the five classification categories for factors such as unemployment, income and poverty rate, the levels are: Distressed (worst), At-risk, Transitional, Competitive and Attainment. According to the Bureau of Labor Statistics, the unemployment rate as of August 2013 was 10.6% (not seasonally adjusted), down from 11.2% for 2012. According to Census American Community Survey data for 2011 the poverty rate is listed at 18.1%.

=== Agriculture ===
The county's agricultural focus is the mass production of Fraser Fir Christmas Trees. Tree farms produce trees year round and they are harvested in mid October, wrapped, stacked and sold in bulk at local or far away lots or shipped to wholesalers across the country. Some farms also sell directly to visitors. Shrubbery, landscaping and greenhouses all are important agricultural aspects of the county's economy, as is beef cattle farming.

In keeping with a growing trend in the NC mountains and foothills, grape growing and vineyards are becoming popular with three vineyards presently operating in the county in Banner Elk, Plumtree and Linville Falls.

== Transportation ==
=== Major highways ===
- US 19E
- US 221
- US 321
- NC 105
- NC 181
- NC 184
- NC 194

=== Aviation ===
Avery County is served primarily by the Avery County Airport (FAA LID: 7A8), located 10 miles (16 km) southwest of Newland. Avery County Airport is a public general aviation airport that serves both Avery and Mitchell counties and offers no scheduled or commercial operations. Opened to the public in 1962, it has been paved and expanded multiple times. The facility also features a helipad.

Elk River Airport (FAA LID: NC06), a smaller private airport, is located in Banner Elk parallel to NC 194 at the Elk River Club residential community. It is used exclusively by residents and approved guests of the Elk River Property Owners Association. Avery County Transportation (ACT) provides general public transportation vans for a fee. The service is by call, offering rides to various locations in the county and out-of-county medical rides. The transportation office and garage is located on NC 194, just north of the Newland city limits.

=== Major infrastructure ===
- Avery County Airport (Morrison Field)
- Elk River Airport
- Linville Ridge Heliport

== Education ==
=== Avery County schools ===
Avery County Schools has eight schools housed on seven campuses, ranging from pre-kindergarten to twelfth grade: five elementary schools, two middle schools and a central high school. Avery High School has close to 700 students and is located near Newland. It is scheduled for large-scale renovations by 2023. Avery High has a dual enrolment partnership program with Mayland Community College, which allows students to earn college credits while still in high school. The two county middle schools are: Avery Middle across from the High School, built in 1978, and Cranberry Middle in Cranberry on a joint campus with Freedom Trail elementary near Elk Park, built in 1998. Other county elementary schools are located in: Newland, Crossnore Elementary was built on a new campus in 2003, Riverside Elementary in lower western Avery built in 1987 and Banner Elk Elementary.

Three small local high schools were closed in 1969 with the opening of the present central Avery County High School near Newland. Crossnore High School was torn down in the early 1970s. The largest of the old high schools, Cranberry High School, is now preserved as a community center in Cranberry near Elk Park. Numerous older historic rock work schools built by the Depression-era Work Projects Administration (WPA) that had been community K-8 schools were closed, starting with the old Riverside School in 1987. Both Elk Park School and Minneapolis Schools were closed in 1998 and consolidated into the new Cranberry Middle-Freedom trail School. Beech Mountain school was the last K-8 school in Avery County. It was closed in 2008 and is now a community center. The area students were moved to Cranberry Middle-Freedom Trail School. The last WPA school still operating in the county was the old downtown Banner Elk School, which closed in 2011 and reopened on a new campus located between Banner Elk and Sugar Mountain.

=== Charter schools ===
Two authorized charter schools operate in Avery County:

- Crossnore Academy, formerly an orphanage in the Town of Crossnore
- Grandfather Academy, formerly Grandfather Home Orphanage in Banner Elk

=== Colleges and universities ===
- Lees-McRae College (LMC), located in Banner Elk, is a private, four-year liberal arts college that is Presbyterian Church affiliated.
- Mayland Community College (MCC), located straddling along the county line of both Avery and Mitchell Counties, is a public community college, which offers associate's degrees and a university-parallel college transfer program towards a bachelor's degree.

== Media ==
Based in Newland, the Avery Post and Avery Journal-Times cover all of Avery County. The Avery Journal-Times newspaper is owned by Jones Media publishing company and is a sister publication of the Watauga Democrat in Boone, while the Post is locally owned

WECR radio station at 1130 on the AM dial serves the local area with local programs and religious music, along with local news, events and weather.

Television coverage is primarily based out of Charlotte, which the county is in its Designated Market Area (DMA). However, because of proximity, several stations in the Tri-Cities also cover the area and are carried on local cable.

== Medical ==
The county's public hospital is Charles A. Cannon Memorial Hospital in Linville, a campus of Appalachian Healthcare System, headquartered at Watauga Medical Center in Boone. The hospital is centrally located in Linville and opened in 2000, to consolidate and replace the old Cannon Hospital located in Banner Elk and Sloop Hospital located in Crossnore. The new campus also hosts the Sloop Medical Building, which houses various doctor's and dentist's offices, the local YMCA complex, and a pharmacy. The hospital is a critical care facility with a 24-hour emergency department as well as imagery, lab, surgery, and other services. Critical illnesses and injuries and trauma patients are often stabilized at Cannon, then are flown or transported by ambulance to hospitals in Charlotte, Asheville, or Johnson City, Tennessee. The hospital formerly had 25 medical beds, but now has 8 since the opening of Appalachian Regional Behavioral Health hospital in late 2021.

Appalachian Regional Behavioral Health Hospital (ARBH) is an independent psychiatric hospital built to accommodate increasing demand for mental health services in the area. It expands on the former 10 bed psychiatric unit of Cannon Hospital with 27 total beds and a triage area where patients can walk in for an assessment to determine if inpatient care is necessary.

Blue Ridge Hospital, a Mission Health care System campus, located just beyond Avery County in the neighboring Mitchell County town of Spruce Pine, also serves the lower portion of Avery County.

The Avery County Emergency Medical Service (EMS) is a full-time county department (since 1994). They provide paramedic-level emergency medical care via three ambulances and a supervisor's SUV at all times, at station locations across the county. Backup is provided by fire departments, a rescue squad and law enforcement first responders.

== Communities ==
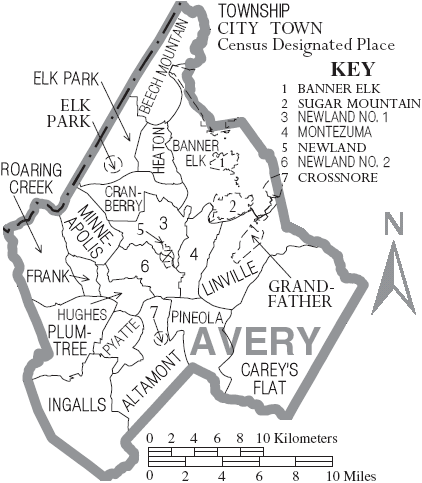
Map of Avery County with municipal and township labels

=== Towns ===
- Banner Elk (largest community)
- Beech Mountain
- Crossnore
- Elk Park
- Newland (county seat)
- Seven Devils

=== Villages ===
- Grandfather
- Sugar Mountain

=== Census-designated place ===
- Linville

=== Townships ===
- Altamont
- Banner Elk
- Beech Mountain
- Carey's Flat
- Cranberry
- Elk Park
- Frank
- Heaton
- Hughes
- Ingalls
- Linville
- Minneapolis
- Montezuma
- Newland No. 1
- Newland No. 2
- Pineola
- Plumtree
- Pyatte
- Roaring Creek

=== Unincorporated communities ===
- Altamont
- Balm
- Beech Creek
- Cranberry
- Elk Valley
- Flat Springs
- Frank
- Gragg
- Heaton
- Hughes
- Ingalls
- Linville Falls
- Minneapolis
- Montezuma
- Pineola
- Plumtree
- Pyatte
- Roaring Creek
- Spear
- Three Mile
- Vale
- Valley
- Whaley

== See also ==
- List of counties in North Carolina
- National Register of Historic Places listings in Avery County, North Carolina
