= North Carolina Highway 126 =

State highway in North Carolina, US

North Carolina Highway 126

Route information
- Maintained by NCDOT
- Length: 23.1 mi (37.2 km)
- Existed: 1940–present
- Tourist routes: Pisgah Loop Scenic Byway

Major junctions
- West end: US 70 in Nebo
- East end: NC 181 in Morganton

Location
- Country: United States
- State: North Carolina
- Counties: McDowell, Burke

Highway system
- North Carolina Highway System; Interstate; US; State; Scenic
← NC 125	→ NC 127

North Carolina Highway 126 (NC 126) is a primary state highway in the U.S. state of North Carolina. It runs from US 70, in Nebo, to NC 181, in Morganton.

== Route description ==
NC 126 has changed little since it was established in 1940, thus the entire route has many curves as it bends around Lake James. It serves primarily to connect the people that live on the north side of Lake James to Marion and Morganton; secondary as a scenic route and access to Lake James State Park.

=== Scenic byways ===
Pisgah Loop Scenic Byway is a 47-mile (76 km) loop byway. The route is not recommended for recreational vehicles or buses, and four-wheel-drive vehicles are required for unpaved portions. NC 126 makes up the southern section of the byway (5 miles (8.0 km)). It is noted for being part of the "Overmountain Victory Trail Commemorative Motor Route" and nearby Lake James State Park. Other roads and highways that make-up the loop are: Fish Hatchery Road (SR 1254 & 1240), NC 181, NC 183, and Old NC Highway 105 (SR 1238, the entire road is unpaved).

== History ==
In 1933, NC 126 was established between US 258/NC 12, near Snow Hill, to US 17/NC 30 Wilmar. It was quickly replaced by an extension of NC 102.

The current NC 126 was established in 1940 as a renumbering of NC 105 from the community of Longtown to the city of Morganton. In 1954, NC 126 was extended west, replacing NC 105's southern portion from Longtown to Nebo, while the northern section was decommissioned and exists today as unpaved road known as Old NC Highway 105.

== Major intersections ==
County	Location	mi	km	Destinations	Notes
McDowell	Nebo	0.0	0.0	US 70 – Marion, Morganton	Western terminus
Burke	Morganton	23.1	37.2	NC 181 – Linville, Newland	Eastern terminus
1.000 mi = 1.609 km; 1.000 km = 0.621 mi
