= North Carolina Highway 183 =

State highway in North Carolina, US

North Carolina Highway 183

Route information
- Maintained by NCDOT
- Length: 4.5 mi (7.2 km)
- Existed: ca. 1930–present
- Tourist routes: Pisgah Loop Scenic Byway

Major junctions
- West end: US 221 in Linville Falls
- East end: NC 181 near Jonas Ridge

Location
- Country: United States
- State: North Carolina
- Counties: Burke, McDowell

Highway system
- North Carolina Highway System; Interstate; US; State; Scenic
← NC 182	→ NC 184

North Carolina Highway 183 (NC 183) is a primary state highway in the U.S. state of North Carolina. It traverses from US 221, in the community of Linville Falls, to NC 181, near the community of Jonas Ridge.

== Route description ==
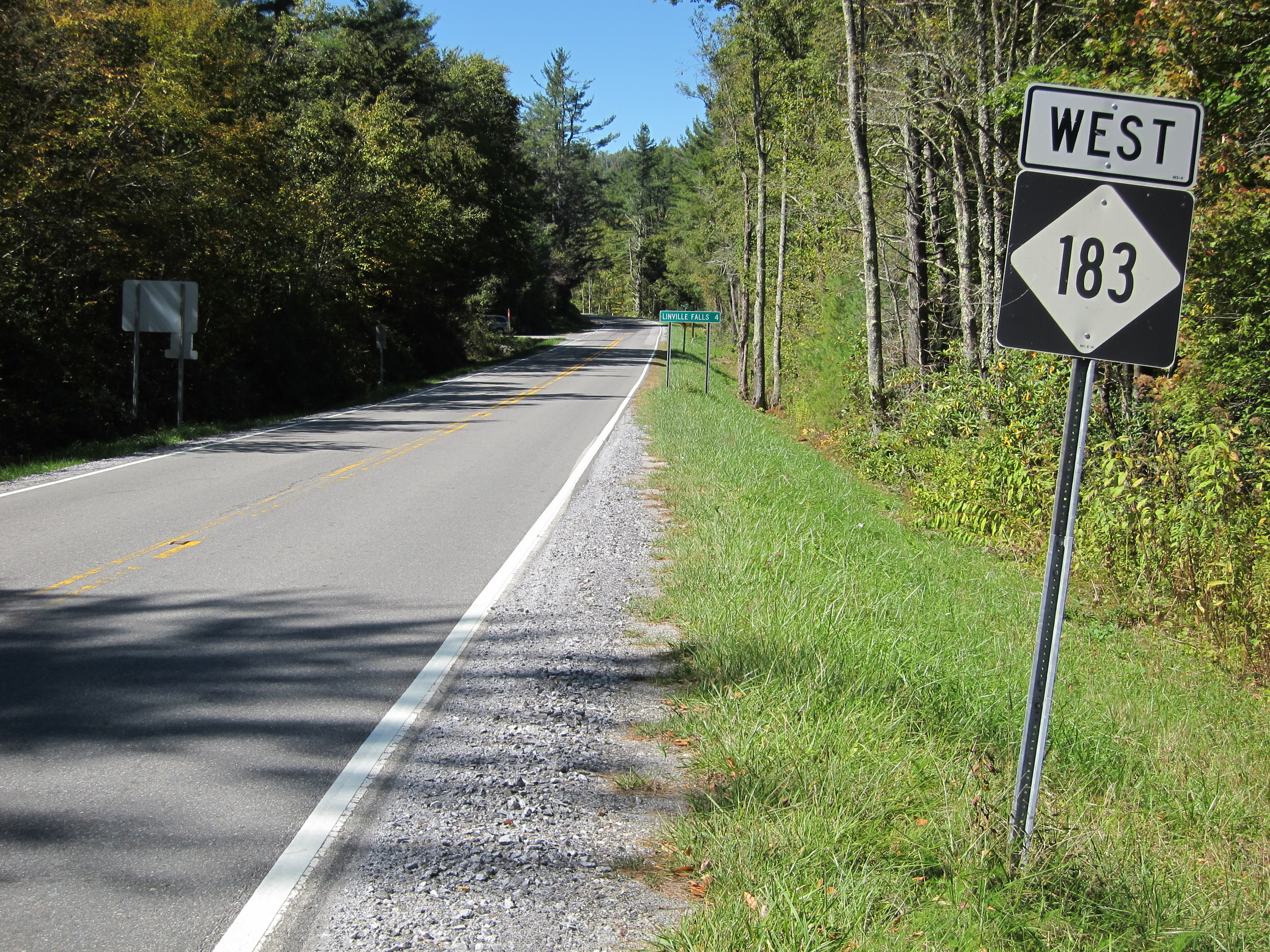
First NC 183 West sign, near Jonas Ridge

The route serves mainly as a connector between Linville Falls and the rest of Burke County; it also serves as an alternate route to the Blue Ridge Parkway, which parallels the route. The route also has access to the Linville Falls and Gorge Wilderness Area. Part of the route is shared with NC Bike Route 2.

Where NC 183 begins, it is flanked by nearby McDowell and Avery counties. The highway also crosses briefly into McDowell county twice, in two short successions, in Linville Falls. Nearly halfway along the highway, a spur road from the Blue Ridge Parkway does a fly-over above the highway (no access).

NC 183, with continuation via NC 181, can be considered an alternate route of US 221, bypassing Altamont and Crossnore.

=== Scenic byways ===
NC 183 is part of one scenic byway in the state (indicated by a Scenic Byways sign).

Pisgah Loop Scenic Byway is a 47-mile (76 km) loop byway. The route is not recommended for recreational vehicles or buses, and four-wheel-drive vehicles are required for unpaved portions. It is noted for its close proximity to the Blue Ridge Parkway, the Linville River and Falls, and a rare montane (mountain wetland). NC 183 makes up the northern segment of the loop, which also includes Old NC Highway 105 (SR 1238), NC 126, Fish Hatchery Road (SR 1254/SR 1240), and NC 181.

== History ==
NC 183 was established around 1930 as a new primary route between NC 105 and NC 181, in northern Burke County. In 1954, NC 183 replaced part of NC 105, into Linville Falls, to its current western terminus at US 221.

== Junction list ==
County	Location	mi	km	Destinations	Notes
Burke	Linville Falls	0.0	0.0	US 221 (Linville Falls Highway) – Linville, Blowing Rock, Boone, Marion	
McDowell	No major junctions				
Burke	No major junctions				
McDowell	No major junctions				
Burke	Jonas Ridge	4.5	7.2	NC 181 (Beatrice Cobb Highway) – Pineola, Linville, Newland, Morganton	
1.000 mi = 1.609 km; 1.000 km = 0.621 mi
