= North Carolina Highway 181 =

State highway in North Carolina, US

North Carolina Highway 181
- Beatrice Cobb Highway

Route information
- Maintained by NCDOT
- Length: 36.2 mi (58.3 km)
- Existed: 1928–present
- Tourist routes: Pisgah Loop Scenic Byway

Major junctions
- South end: US 64 Bus. / US 70 Bus. / NC 18 in Morganton
- US 221 in Pineola
- North end: NC 194 in Newland

Location
- Country: United States
- State: North Carolina
- Counties: Burke, Avery

Highway system
- North Carolina Highway System; Interstate; US; State; Scenic
← NC 180	→ NC 182

North Carolina Highway 181 (NC 181) is a primary state highway in the U.S. state of North Carolina. It runs north–south from Morganton to Newland.

== Route description ==
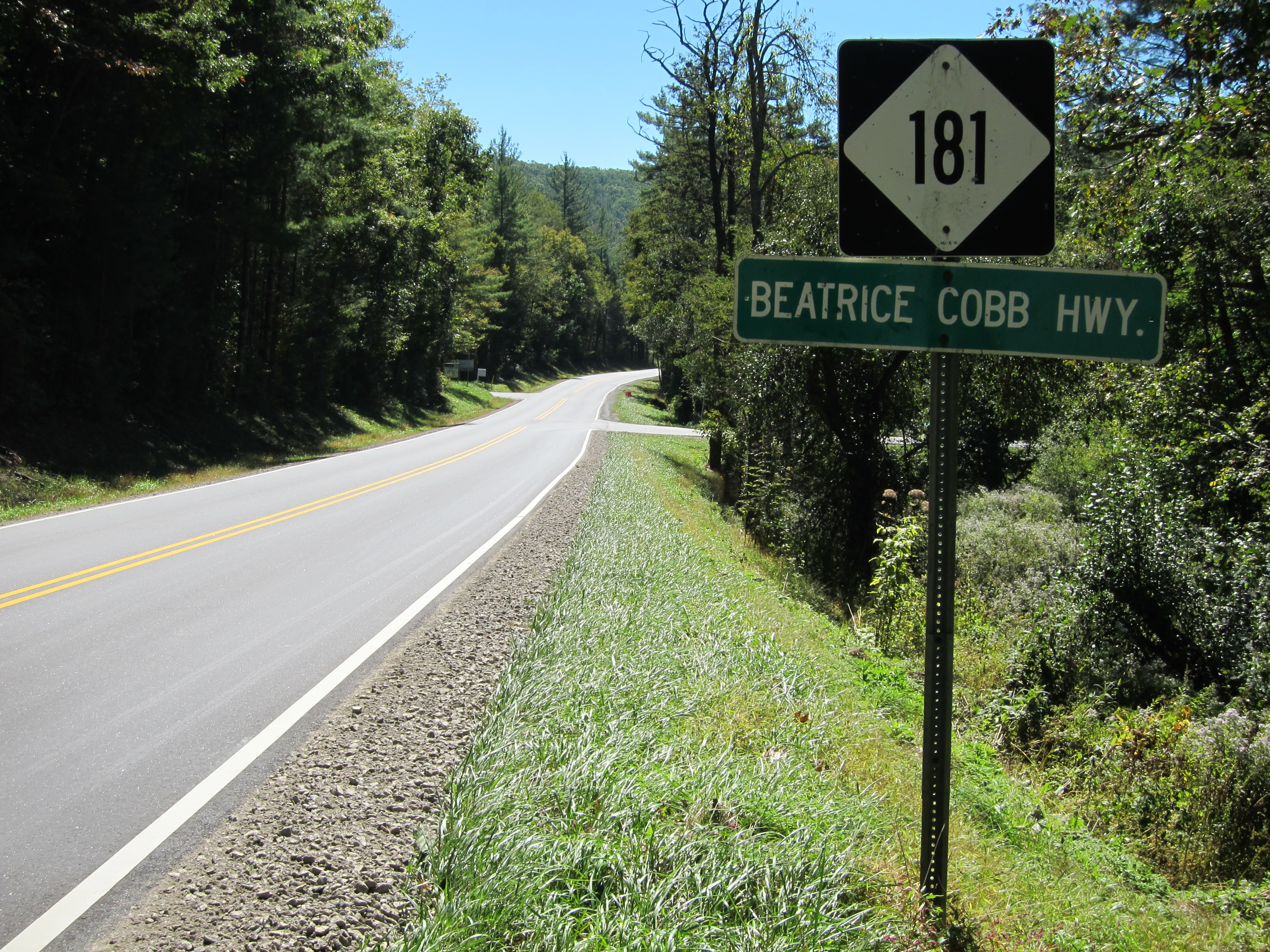
Beatrice Cobb Highway sign, near Jonas Ridge

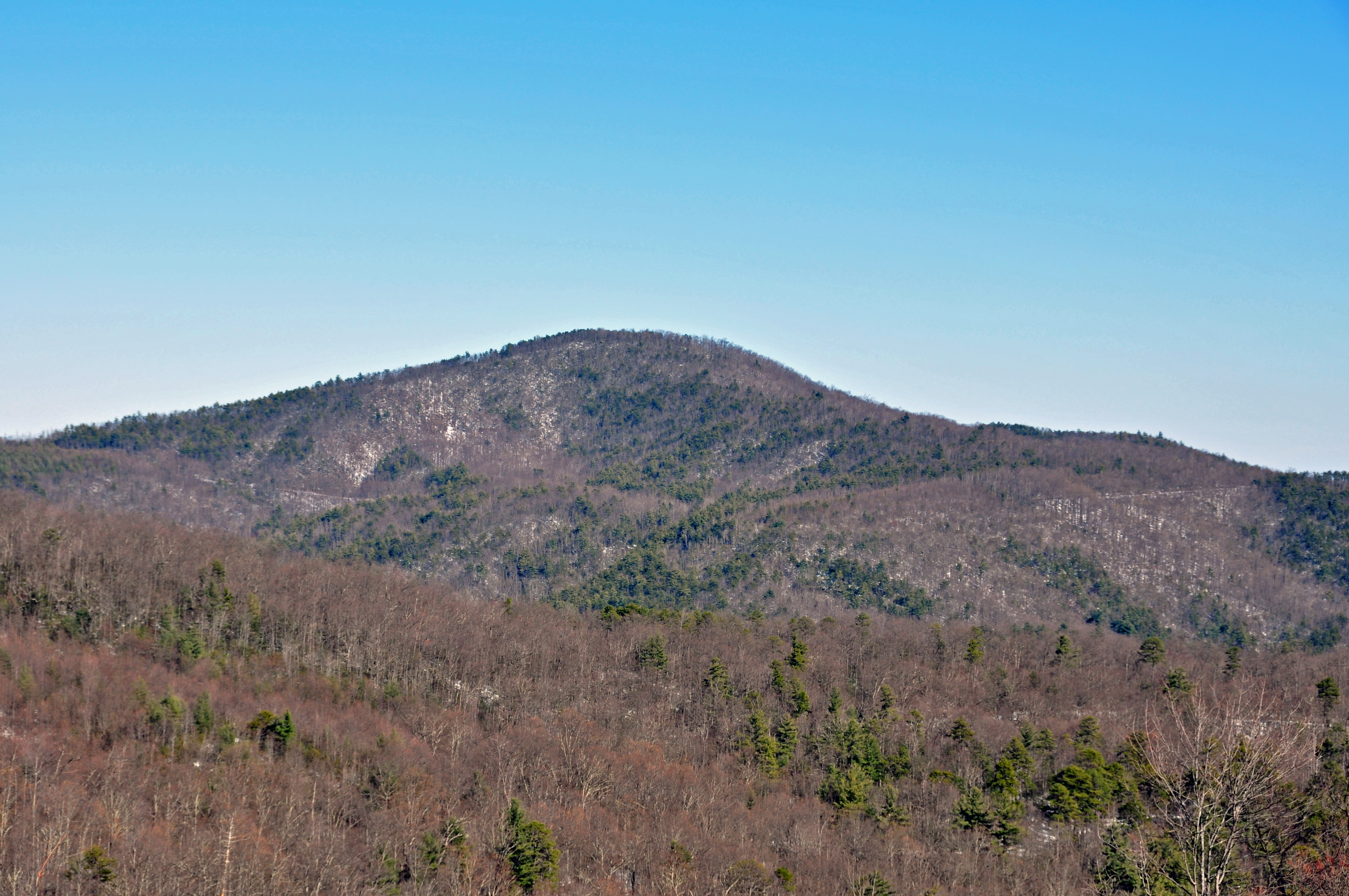
Chestnut Mountain, from the Brown Mountain Overlook

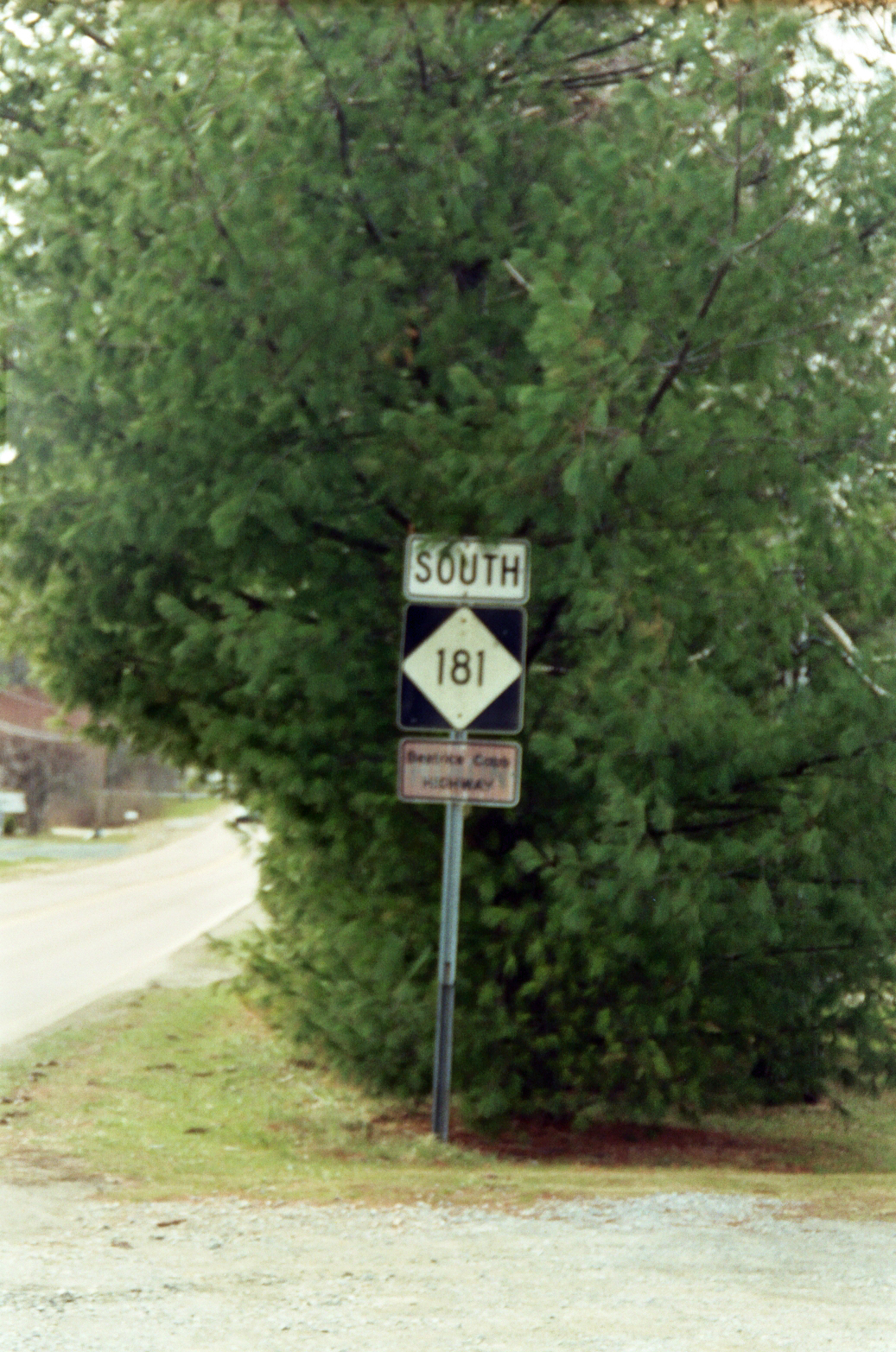
Original Beatrice Cobb Highway sign, in Pineola

The route serves as the main road from Morganton to Northern Burke County then on towards Newland in Avery County. The first 12 miles (19 km) of the road appears as a regular back road highway, going by homes and shrubbery farms. At Brown Mountain Beach Road, the sharp bend of the highway starts the climb up through the Pisgah National Forest to Jonas Ridge. This 13-mile (21 km) section of the highway features multiple curves (some tight with speed warnings), multiple passing lanes (five up, two down, one turnoff down), and mostly undeveloped wooded lands. Before Jonas Ridge is the Brown Mountain Overlook, where stories of phantom lights on the mountain can be seen from the location. After Jonas Ridge, the highway goes parallel with the Blue Ridge Parkway for a mile before passing over it. In Pineola, the highway overlaps with US 221 for almost three miles (4.8 km) before splitting in Linville. The last section of the highway goes by several hills and mountains covered by Fraser firs before entering the Newland city limits and ending at NC 194 (Pineola Street).

One unique feature of the highway is the use of mile markers, which only appear between before Brown Mountain Beach Road and Jonas Ridge (mile markers 12-27). An oddity for a two-lane surface road in the state; however, the reason why they exist is simply to assist police and rescue crews to better locate accidents or lost hikers along the curvy section of the highway.

A majority of the route shares with either North Carolina Bicycle Route 2 (Mountains to Sea) or North Carolina Bicycle Route 6 (Piedmont Spur). Route 6 is concurrent with NC 181 from its southern terminus in Morganton to Brown Mountain Road and Route 2 is concurrent from Brown Mountain Road to NC 183. Because it mostly overlaps with a state bike route, the road has wider paved shoulders compared to other roads in the area. Because of these extra features, it is not uncommon to find several bikes and motorcycles riding along the highway on any given nice day. NC 181 overlaps with one state scenic byways, the Pisgah Loop Scenic Byway, between Fish Hatchery Road and NC 183.

=== Dedicated and memorial names ===
NC 181 in North Carolina has three dedicated or memorialized sections of highway.

- Beatrice Cobb Highway - official name of all NC 181 in both Burke and Avery counties. It is named after Beatrice Cobb (1888–1959) who started her career early as a teacher and writer. In 1916, she became editor and publisher of the Morganton Herald; in 1922 she was chosen secretary of the North Carolina Press Association by her peers. Eventually her journalism clout in the state became also political clout; she was a Democratic National Committeewoman and an adviser on allocations to federal agencies in the state during the New Deal era. She received numerous awards during her career and an honorary doctorate from the University of North Carolina.
- Dr. Mary Martin Sloop Highway - overlapping official North Carolina name of US 221; between Pineola and Linville where NC 181 overlaps.
- S B Lacey Jr Highway - overlapping official North Carolina name of NC 181 between Linville and Newland.

== History ==
The highway was established in 1928 as a new primary routing between NC 18 in Morganton and NC 194 west of Pineola. In 1929, NC 181 was extended southwest to NC 19 in Ruth. In 1930, NC 181 was rerouted north of Pineola to Linville, replacing NC 175, and then west to its current northern terminus at NC 194 in Newland replacing NC 176; its old alignment became part of NC 691. In 1934, NC 181 reached its longest length with an extension southwest to US 176 in Tryon. In 1940, NC 181 was truncated back to Morganton; its former routing was replaced by NC 108 between Tryon and Rutherfordton and US 64A between Ruth and Morganton.

In 1977, NC 181 was removed from Avery Avenue and extended along both Sterling Street (southbound) and Green Street (northbound) to its current terminus along Meeting Street, in downtown Morganton. In 1989 or 1990, NC 181 was placed on new bypass route north of Montezuma. In 1991, US 221/NC 181 was removed from Linville Avenue (downgraded to secondary road) and placed on new bypass route west of Linville.

=== North Carolina Highway 176 ===
North Carolina Highway 176
- Location: Pineola–Linville, NC
- Existed: 1928–1930

North Carolina Highway 176 (NC 176) was established around 1928 and traversed from NC 181, in Pineola, north to NC 175, in Linville. In 1930 it was decommissioned in favor of an extension of NC 181.

== Junction list ==
County	Location	mi	km	Destinations	Notes
Burke	Morganton	0.0	0.0	US 64 Bus. west / US 70 Bus. / NC 18 south	West end of US 64 Business overlap, south end of NC 18 overlap
Burke	Morganton	0.2	0.32	US 64 Bus. east / NC 18 north (Avery Avenue)	East end of US 64 Business overlap, north end of NC 18 overlap
Burke	Morganton	1.1	1.8	US 64 (US 64 Bypass) – Lenoir	
Burke	Morganton	1.7	2.7	NC 126 west – Lake James	
Burke		9.0	14.5	Fish Hatchery Road	
Burke		12.4	20.0	Brown Mountain Beach Road	
Burke		26.5	42.6	NC 183 west – Linville Falls	To Linville Gorge Wilderness
Avery		28.2	45.4	Blue Ridge Parkway	
Avery	Pineola	30.0	48.3	US 221 south (Linville Falls Highway) – Crossnore, Marion	South end of US 221 overlap
Avery	Linville	32.8	52.8	US 221 north to NC 105 (Newland Highway) – Linville, Boone, Banner Elk	North end of US 221 overlap; to Grandfather Mountain and area ski resorts
Avery	Newland	36.2	58.3	NC 194 (Pineola Street) – Elk Park, Crossnore	
1.000 mi = 1.609 km; 1.000 km = 0.621 mi: Concurrency terminus
