= Fonta Flora =

- Defunct Village
- Location within North Carolina
- Coordinates: 35°47′29″N 81°53′28″W
- First confirmed presence: 1860s
- Extinction: 1923

Population
  - Total: 0
- Time zone: UTC-5 (Central Time Zone)
- Postal code (Lake area): 28761

Fonta Flora was a village located in the current location of Lake James, in the western part of the U.S. state of North Carolina. The town was flooded by an inundation, which submerged it. The village soon became part of the local Burke County's folklore.

== History ==
Despite all the uncertain details surrounding the community, it did actually exist.

Local maps and news reports in the early 1900s mention the community and show the presence of various roads and country stores, a post office, and a Methodist Church. One of these maps is located in the Burke County Public Library.

There is no founding date known, however, the town already existed by the 1890s, with records showing it's having up to 18 residents at the time, reaching up to 100 during the early 1900s, showing a significant growth. Records of a place known as Fonta Flora are as old as just after the American Civil War, in the 1860s, hinting at the presence of the settlement as far back as then.

By the 1910s, notably, the community was diverse, with up to 4 four black families present in the town.

By as early as 1913, rumors of a possible future flooding started to spread after the various damming plans in the area started to be acknowledged by the public. It is believed, however, that the local population supported the construction of the dams, believing that it would bring income into the community.

One of the causes of the flood that submerged the community was the damming of the Catawba River, Linville River, and Paddy's Creek by the Southern Power Company (today known as Duke Company), aiming to create a hydroelectric facility between 1916 and 1923.

It seems that the area that was submerged was mostly the one shown on maps, the economic centre, whilst the rest was demolished afterwards.

Interest in the story of the village had become local folklore by the 1960s.

== Myths and uncertain history ==
Although the origin of the village's name is unknown, Glimpses of Fonta Flora, a book written by Helen Norman and Patricia Page, states that the Latin-inspired name has a few possible origins, including the whim of an early postmaster or, more likely, according to the authors, the name of the antebellum Fonti Flora plantation in Fairfield County, South Carolina.

Many people describe Fonta Flora as an "utopia" within the realities of America during the reconstruction period. However, this is debated. Although there seem to have been some sense of community between white and black individuals, there seems to be also evidence of the presence of the KKK within the area, leading to physical assaults, support for voting restrictions on blacks and marginalization by at least the early 1900s.

== Legacy ==
A state trail authorized in 2015, known as the Fonta Flora State Trail, was named after Fonta Flora and passes through areas near the old village. As of July 2025, all sections of the Fonta Flora Trail are open.

Two siblings named Mark and David Bennett visited the Morganton Public Library, trying to find a historical-inspired name that was fitting for their brewery, leading to the creation of a brewery by the name of Fonta Flora in 2013. The brewery received a reward for being Burke County's Visitor Attraction of 2017.
