= Diocese of Western North Carolina =

Episcopal Church diocese in the US

Coordinates: 35.601°N 82.529°W

Location
- Country: United States
- Ecclesiastical province: Province IV

Statistics
- Parishes: 60 (2024)
- Members: 13,152 (2023)

Information
- Denomination: Episcopal Church
- Established: September 12, 1922
- Cathedral: Cathedral of All Souls

Current leadership
- Bishop: José Antonio McLoughlin

Map
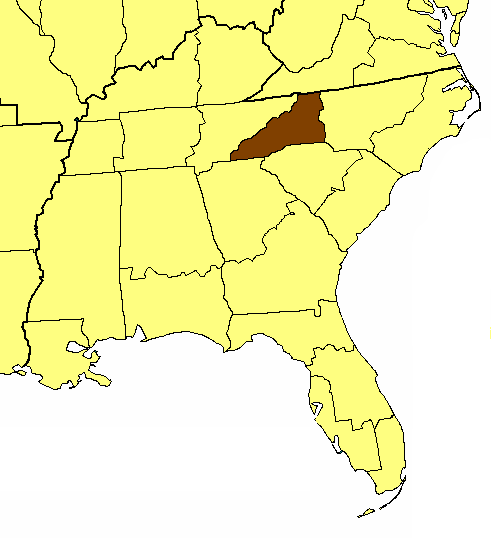
- Location of the Diocese of Western North Carolina

Website
- www.diocesewnc.org

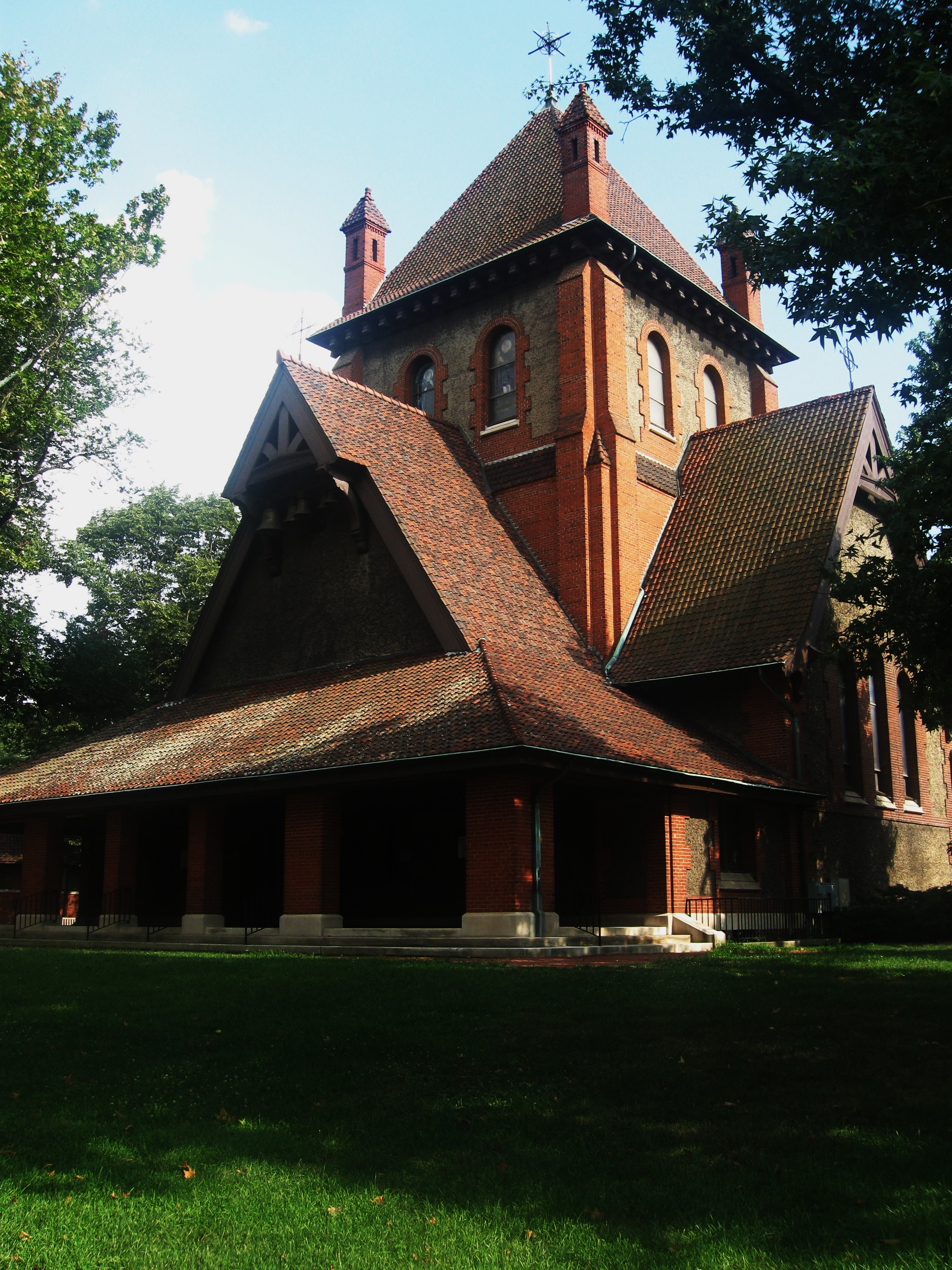
The Cathedral of All Souls

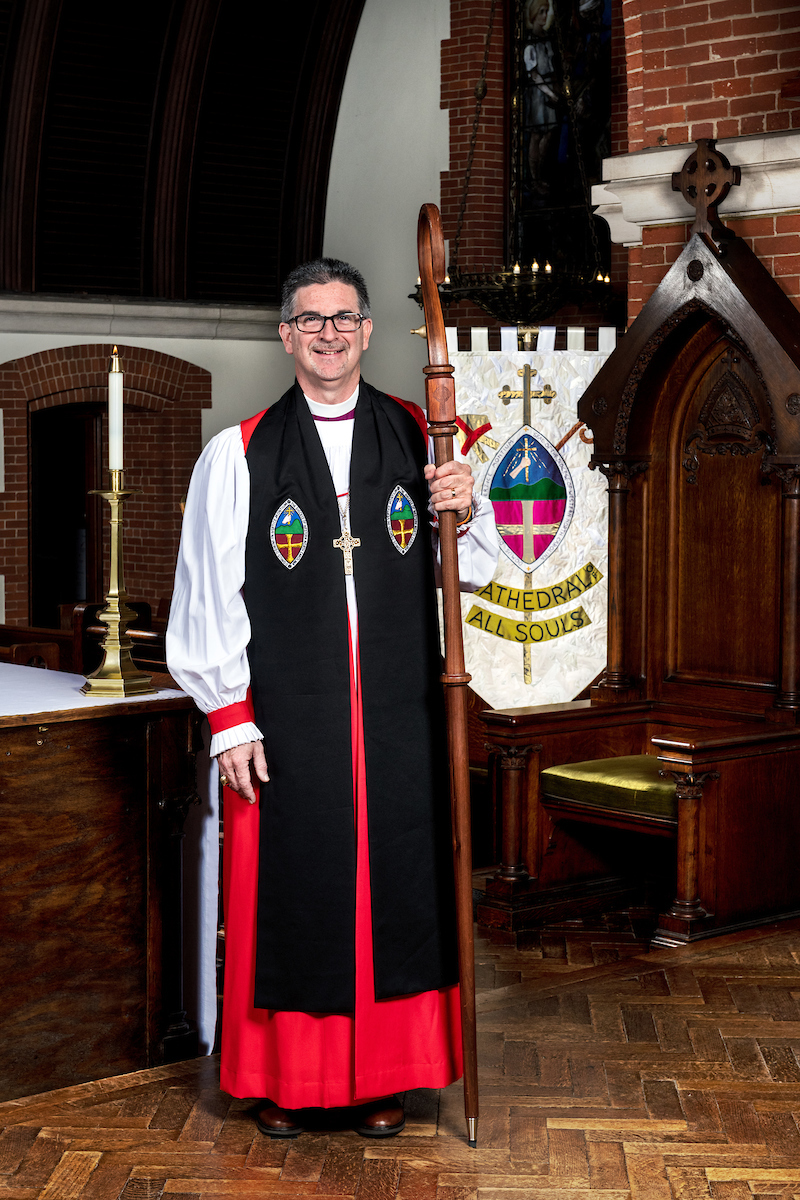
José A. McLoughlin, 7th and current bishop

The Diocese of Western North Carolina is a diocese in the Episcopal Church. It consists of 28 counties in western North Carolina and its episcopal see is in Asheville, North Carolina, seated at the Cathedral of All Souls. The first recorded worship from the Book of Common Prayer west of the Catawba River was in 1786. Valle Crucis, where one of the two conference centers is located, began as a missionary outpost in 1842. In 1894, a resolution was adopted in the Convention of the Diocese of North Carolina that the Western part of the state be set aside and offered to the General Church as a Missionary District. The following year, in November 1895, the first Convention of the District of Asheville was held at Trinity Church in Asheville. In 1922, after all the requirements had been fulfilled, a petition from the Jurisdiction of Asheville to become the Diocese of Western North Carolina was presented at the General Convention of the Protestant Episcopal Church, as the church was then known. It was accepted on September 12, 1922.

The Ravenscroft Associate Missions and Training School of the North Carolina Episcopal Diocese and the former residence of the Bishop was once housed at Schoenberger Hall in Asheville. Diocesan offices are located at the Bishop Henry Center in Asheville.

The diocese includes six summer chapels, a diocesan school (Christ School, Asheville), a retirement community (Deerfield, Asheville), two conference centers (Lake Logan and Valle Crucis), and a summer camp (Camp Henry). The diocese is divided into six deaneries. Its cathedral is the Cathedral of All Souls in Asheville, located in Biltmore Village.

In 2024, the diocese reported average Sunday attendance (ASA) of 4,750 persons, a decrease from 6,145 reported in 2015. The most recent membership statistics (2023) showed 13,152 members, down from 15,074 in 2018. No membership statistics were reported in 2024 national parochial reports. The 60 reporting congregations of the diocese had $16,808,521 in plate and pledge income in 2024.

The diocese is a proponent of social justice, especially in issues concerning immigration, poverty and the marginalized. The diocese is notable for having two small mountain parishes that contain frescoes created by Ben Long, an Italian-trained artist: the fresco of the Last Supper at Holy Trinity church in Glendale Springs and Mary Great with Child and John the Baptist at Saint Mary's Episcopal Church in Beaver Creek, both part of the Holy Communion Parish of Ashe County. In another, much larger parish, St. Paul's Episcopal located in the foothills of Wilkesboro, two recent Long frescoes can be seen. These frescoes depict Paul the Apostle in prison and his conversion of the Road to Damascus. They were completed in 2003.

The diocese has historically practiced a higher churchmanship than most dioceses in the Fourth Province, and particularly the other two dioceses of the state.

== Bishops ==
1. Junius Horner (1922-1933)
2. Robert E. Gribbin (1934-1947)
3. M. George Henry (1948-1975)
4. William G. Weinhauer (1975-1990)
5. Robert H. Johnson (1990-2003)
6. G. Porter Taylor (2004-2016)
7. José Antonio McLoughlin (2016–Present)

The 7th and current diocesan bishop is José Antonio McLoughlin, who was ordained and consecrated on October 1, 2016 and is the first bishop of Western North Carolina of Hispanic descent. Prior to his election as bishop of the Diocese of Western North Carolina, McLoughlin served as the canon to the ordinary and chief-of-staff for the Episcopal Diocese of Oklahoma since 2008. Previously, McLoughlin served congregations in the dioceses of Southeast Florida and Virginia. Bishop José earned his Master of Divinity from Virginia Theological Seminary and Bachelor of Arts from the University of Central Florida. Prior to his call to the priesthood, McLoughlin worked in the criminal justice field serving in the State of Florida as a police officer and in the U.S. Department of Justice in Washington, D.C., in various capacities, most recently as the special assistant to the assistant attorney general. Bishop José was born in San Juan, Puerto Rico and raised in Florida.

== List of parishes ==
=== Asheville Deanery ===
- Cathedral of All Souls, Asheville
- Church of the Advocate
- Grace Episcopal Church, Asheville
- Redeemer Episcopal Church, Asheville
- Saint George's Episcopal Church, Asheville
- Saint James Episcopal Church, Black Mountain
- Saint John's Episcopal Church, Asheville
- St. Luke's Episcopal Church (Asheville, North Carolina)
- St. Mary's Episcopal Church (Asheville, North Carolina)
- St. Matthias Episcopal Church, Asheville
- Trinity Episcopal Church, Asheville
- Episcopal Church of the Holy Spirit, Mars Hill

=== Foothills Deanery ===
- Church of the Ascension, Hickory
- Church of the Epiphany, Hickory
- Grace Episcopal Church, Morganton
- Saint Alban's Episcopal Church, Hickory
- Saint James Episcopal Church, Lenoir
- Saint John's Episcopal Church, Marion
- Saint Mary & Saint Stephen Episcopal Church, Morganton
- Saint Paul's Episcopal Church, Wilkesboro
- Saint Paul's Episcopal Church, Morganton

=== Hendersonville Deanery ===
- Calvary Episcopal Church, Fletcher
- Church of the Holy Family, Mills River
- Church of the Transfiguration, Saluda
- Episcopal Church of Saint John in the Wilderness, Flat Rock
- Episcopal Church of the Holy Cross, Tryon
- Episcopal Church of the Transfiguration Bat Cave
- Good Shepherd Episcopal Church, Tryon
- La Capilla De Santa Maria, Hendersonville
- Saint James Episcopal Church, Hendersonville
- Saint Paul's Episcopal Church, Edneyville
- Saint Philip's Episcopal Church, Brevard

=== Mountain Deanery ===
- Christ Church, Sparta
- Church of the Holy Cross, Valle Crucis
- Church of the Resurrection, Little Switzerland
- Church of Our Savior, Newland
- Holy Communion Episcopal Parish, Ashe County, Glendale Springs and West Jefferson
- Saint Luke's Episcopal Church, Boone
- Saint Mary of the Hills Episcopal Church, Blowing Rock
- Saint Thomas Episcopal Church, Burnsville
- Trinity Episcopal Church, Spruce Pine

=== Piedmont Deanery ===
- All Saints Episcopal Church, Gastonia
- Church of the Redeemer, Shelby
- Episcopal Church of Saint Peter by the Lake, Denver
- Episcopal Church of Our Savior, Lincolnton
- Saint Andrew's Episcopal Church, Bessemer City
- Saint Francis Episcopal Church, Rutherfordton
- Saint Gabriel's Episcopal Church, Rutherfordton
- Saint Luke's Episcopal Church, Lincolnton
- Saint Mark's Episcopal Church, Gastonia

=== Western Deanery ===
- All Saints Episcopal Church Franklin
- Church of the Good Shepherd (Cashiers, North Carolina)
- Church of the Incarnation (Highlands, North Carolina)
- Church of the Messiah, Murphy
- Episcopal Church of the Good Shepherd, Hayesville
- Grace Church in the Mountains, Waynesville
- Grace Mountainside Church, Robbinsville
- Saint Andrew's Episcopal Church, Canton
- Saint David's Episcopal Church, Cullowhee
- Saint Francis Episcopal Church, Cherokee, NC/Cullowhee
- Saint John's Episcopal Church, Sylva
- Saint John's Episcopal Church - Cartoogechaye, Franklin
