= Robert E. Gribbin =

The Right Reverend Robert Emmet Gribbin D.D., S.T.D.
- Bishop of Western North Carolina
- Church: Episcopal Church
- Diocese: Western North Carolina
- Elected: October 17, 1933
- In office: 1934–1947
- Predecessor: Junius Horner
- Successor: M. George Henry

Orders
- Ordination: May 9, 1913 by William A. Guerry
- Consecration: January 25, 1934 by James De Wolf Perry

Personal details
- Born: February 21, 1887 Windsor, South Carolina, United States
- Died: September 23, 1976 (aged 89)
- Buried: Magnolia Cemetery
- Denomination: Anglican
- Parents: John Gribbin & Rebecca Moore
- Spouse: Emma Manigault Jenkins
- Children: 3

Robert Emmet Gribbin (February 21, 1887 – September 23, 1976) was an American prelate of the Episcopal Church, who served as the second of Bishop of Western North Carolina.

== Early life and education ==
Gribbin was born in Windsor, South Carolina, on February 21, 1887, the son of John Gribbin and Rebecca Moore. He studied at The Citadel, and graduated with a Bachelor of Science in 1906. He then studied at the College of Charleston, and earned a Bachelor of Arts in 1909. Afterwards, he enrolled at the General Theological Seminary, from where he graduated with a Bachelor of Divinity in 1912. He was awarded a Doctor of Sacred Theology from General, and a Doctor of Divinity from the University of the South, both in 1934.

== Ordained ministry ==
Gribbin was ordained deacon in 1912 and priest on May 9, 1913, in Grace Church, on both occasions by Bishop William A. Guerry of South Carolina. He served as assistant minister of Grace Church in Charleston, South Carolina between 1912 and 1915, and then at St Luke's Church in Atlanta, Georgia between 1915 and 1916. In 1916, he became rector of St John's Church in Wilmington, North Carolina, while in 1921, he became rector of St Paul's Church in Winston-Salem, North Carolina, where he remained till 1934.

== Bishop ==
On October 17, 1933, during a special diocesan convention held at St Francis' Church in Rutherfordton, North Carolina, Gribbin was elected as the second Bishop of Western North Carolina on the third ballot. He was consecrated on January 25, 1934, at St Paul's Church in Winston-Salem, North Carolina, by Presiding Bishop James De Wolf Perry. Gribbin retired in 1947.

== Family ==
On June 30, 1915, Gibbin married Emma Manigault Jenkins, and together had three children, including Robert Emmet Gribbin Jr., who was also ordained a priest. Robert E. Gribbin, 3rd, who served as the United States Ambassador to the Central African Republic and then Rwanda, is the son of the Reverend Robert Emmet Gribbin Jr., and grandson of Bishop Gribbin.
