= Grace Episcopal Church, Morganton, North Carolina =

Coordinates: 35°44′33.5″N 81°41′9″W

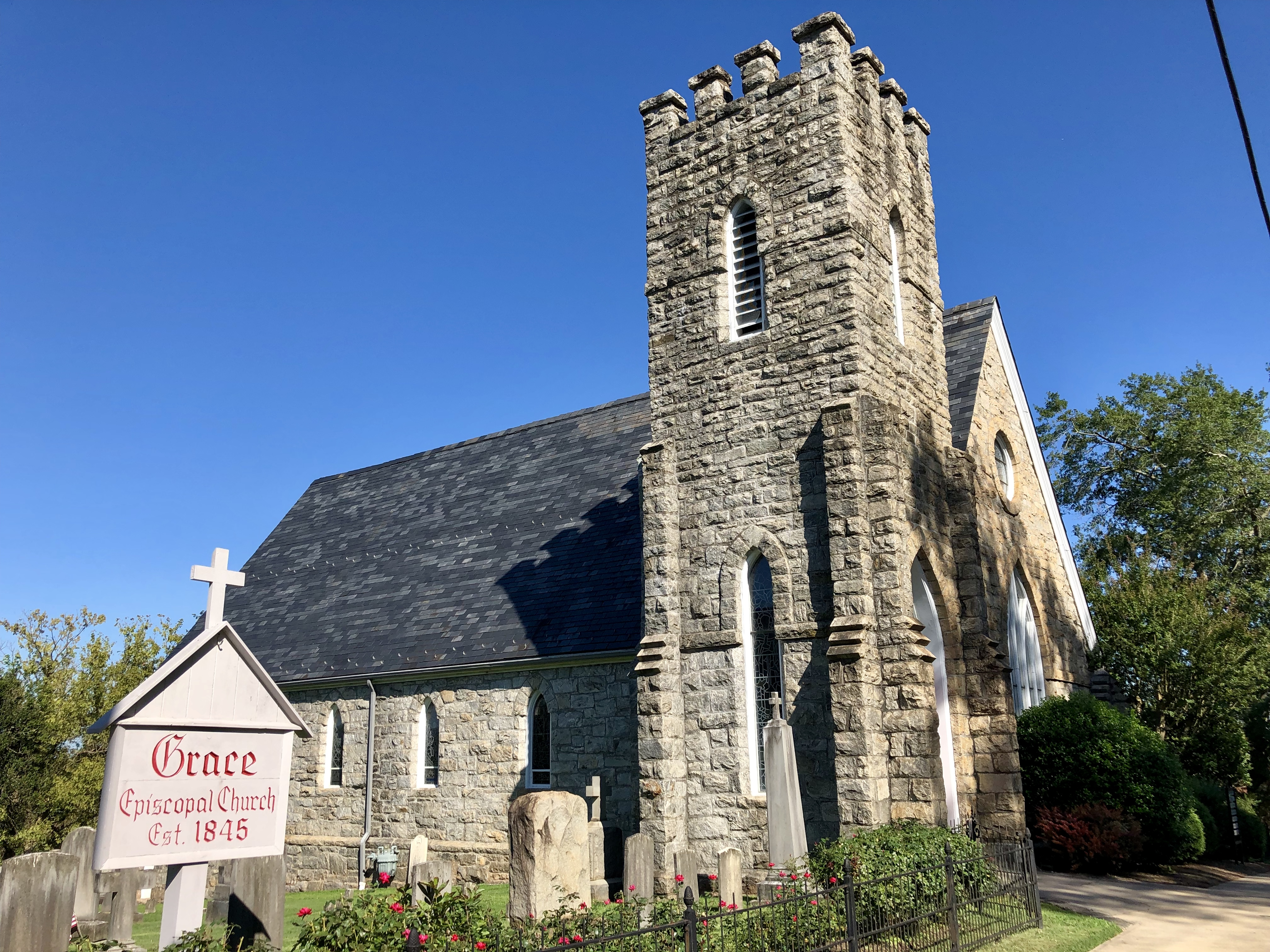
Grace Episcopal Church

Grace Episcopal Church is a parish of the Episcopal Diocese of Western North Carolina in Morganton, North Carolina. Founded in 1845, property was procured at the corner of King Street and Meeting Street, and the original structure was constructed in 1846 primarily from timber, seating approximately 50 people. The current structure was constructed in 1896 from local granite and is listed on the National Register of Historic Places.

Grace has enjoyed a rich history of mission and outreach. At the turn of the 20th century, Grace Episcopal Church clergy and members founded five additional Episcopal mission congregations in Burke County, North Carolina, most of which included a chapel and school. Two of the original five mission congregations survive today as parishes: St. Mary's & St. Stephen's Episcopal Church in Morganton and St. Paul's Episcopal Church at Lake James. In 1906, Grace Episcopal Church founded Grace Hospital, originally located near to the existing church building on King Street. Today, Grace Hospital is part of the Blue Ridge Healthcare System. From there, Grace members went on to start the first Red Cross chapter in Burke County, the first hospice in Burke County, and the first Boy Scouts troop for deaf scouts in the United States.

Today, Grace continues its commitment to serving the community in many ways. In particular, its extensive backpack ministry, providing more than 165 10-pound backpacks of food for children and families at a local elementary school. Grace also offers grants to local non-profit service-oriented organizations through the Grace Foundation, founded in 1969, and disbursing between $70,000 and $80,000 per year.

The Rev. John Simpson IV began his tenure as rector in 2025.
