= Holy Communion Episcopal Parish (Ashe County, North Carolina) =

Episcopal parish in North Carolina

Holy Communion Episcopal Parish Holy Trinity, Glendale Springs St. Mary's, West Jefferson Ashe County, North Carolina
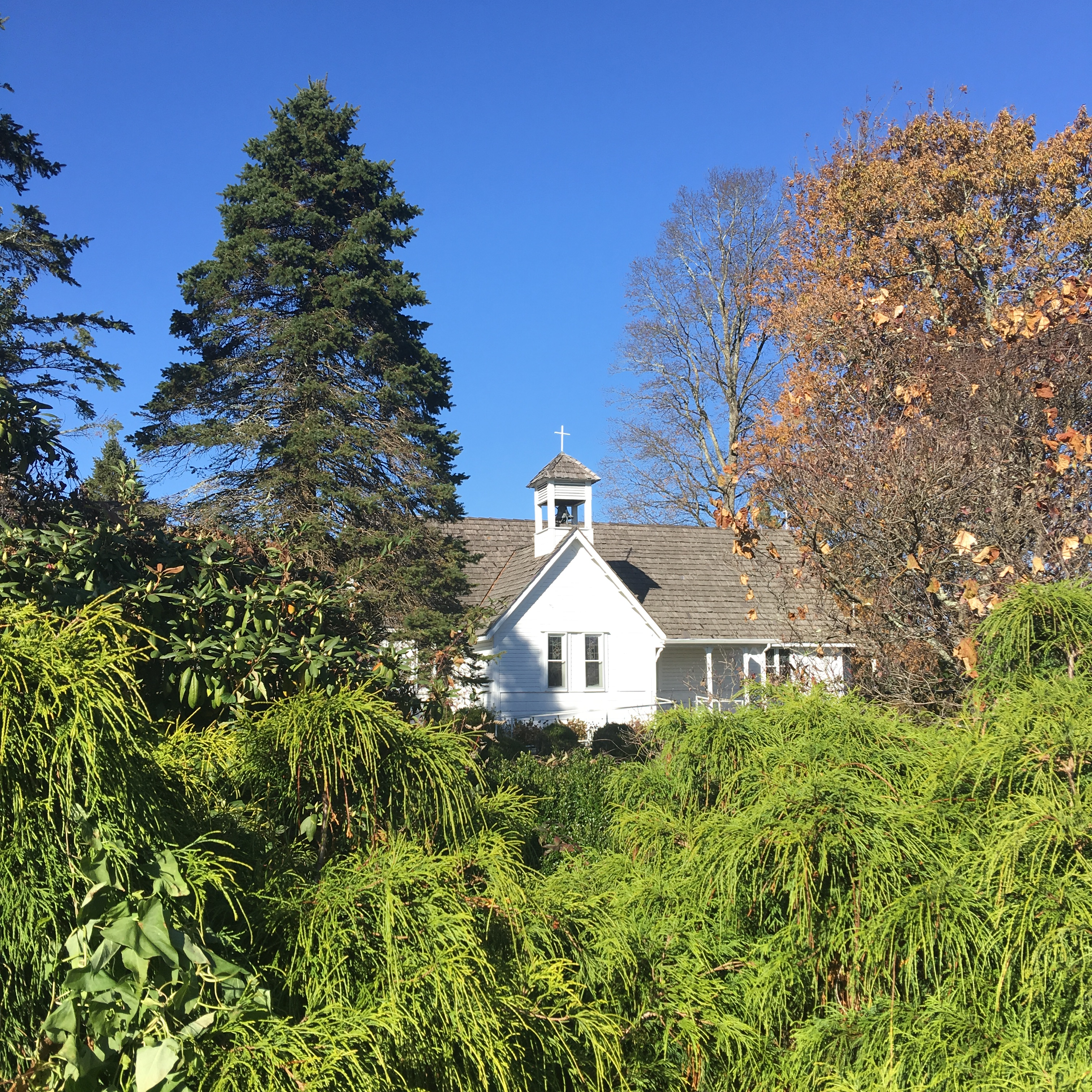
- Holy Trinity Church of the Fresco in November 2019
- Holy Communion Episcopal Parish Holy Trinity, Glendale Springs; St. Mary's, West Jefferson Ashe County, North Carolina
- Denomination: Episcopal Church
- Website: Parish Website

History
- Dedication: Holy Communion, Holy Trinity and St. Mary

Administration
- Province: IV
- Diocese: Western North Carolina; The Rt. Rev. G. Porter Taylor, Bishop
- Deanery: Mountain Deanery
- Parish: Holy Communion

Clergy
- Rector: The Rev. Dr. T. Perry Hildreth

Holy Communion Episcopal Parish, located in Ashe County, North Carolina, is a small parish of the Episcopal Diocese of Western North Carolina. The parish consists of two small historic Carpenter Gothic churches that are both decorated with frescoes by painter Ben Long and his students. The two churches have become popular destinations for Christian pilgrims.

== St. Mary's Episcopal Church ==
St. Mary's Episcopal Church, located on Highway 194, in West Jefferson, was built in 1905. In 1972, the Rev. Faulton Hodge became priest in charge and later agreed to let Ben Long, a young artist newly returned to North Carolina from studying in Italy, paint wet plaster frescoes on the interior walls of St. Mary's.

== Holy Trinity Episcopal Church ==
Holy Trinity Episcopal Church, located twelve miles from St. Mary's at 120 Glendale School Road in Glendale Springs, was built in 1901. Holy Trinity closed in 1946 and stood empty and neglected for 30 years, until Fr. Hodge began a drive to restore it in the late 1970s. In 1980, Ben Long and 20 assistants began painting frescoes on the walls of the church as it was being restored. Later, a chapel named Christ the King was built in Holy Trinity's basement. It is named for a large mosaic done in 1920 by John Joseph Earley, sometimes called John Early, which was donated to the church. A wall fresco was done in 1984 by Jeffrey Mims, a student of Ben Long.

== Ministry of the Frescoes ==
The popularity of the frescoes has required the parish members to start a ministry to keep the two churches open for visitors under the supervision of parishioners who have been trained as docents. The two churches are also part of the Ben Long Fresco Trail.

== Worship services ==
Worship services are alternated between the two churches on a monthly basis.
