= L. L. Keenan =

American politician

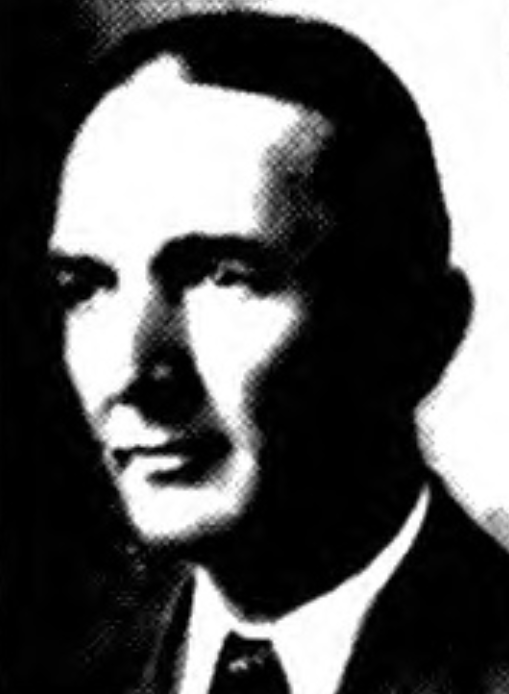
- Keenan in 1949

Member of the South Carolina House of Representatives from Aiken County
- In office January 1949 – July 10, 1949

Personal details
- Born: Lonnie Leroy Keenan; May 3, 1894 Windsor, South Carolina, U.S.
- Died: July 10, 1949 (aged 55) Aiken, South Carolina, U.S.

Lonnie Leroy Keenan (May 3, 1894 – July 10, 1949) was an American politician who served in the South Carolina House of Representatives in 1949.

== Life and career ==
Keenan was born in Windsor, South Carolina, the son of B. K. Keenan and Ida Renew. He graduated from Windsor High School in 1904. After graduating, he worked as a barber.

Keenan served in the South Carolina House of Representatives in 1949. During his service in the House, in 1949, he invited Grand Wizard Samuel Green to the South Carolina General Assembly.

== Death ==
Keenan died at the Aiken County Hospital in Aiken, South Carolina on July 10, 1949, at the age of 55.

E. J. Craig of Warrenville was elected September 20, 1949 to succeed Keenan and complete the rest of the term in the South Carolina House.
