= Schoenberger Hall =

Demolished historic residence in North Carolina, US

- U.S. National Register of Historic Places
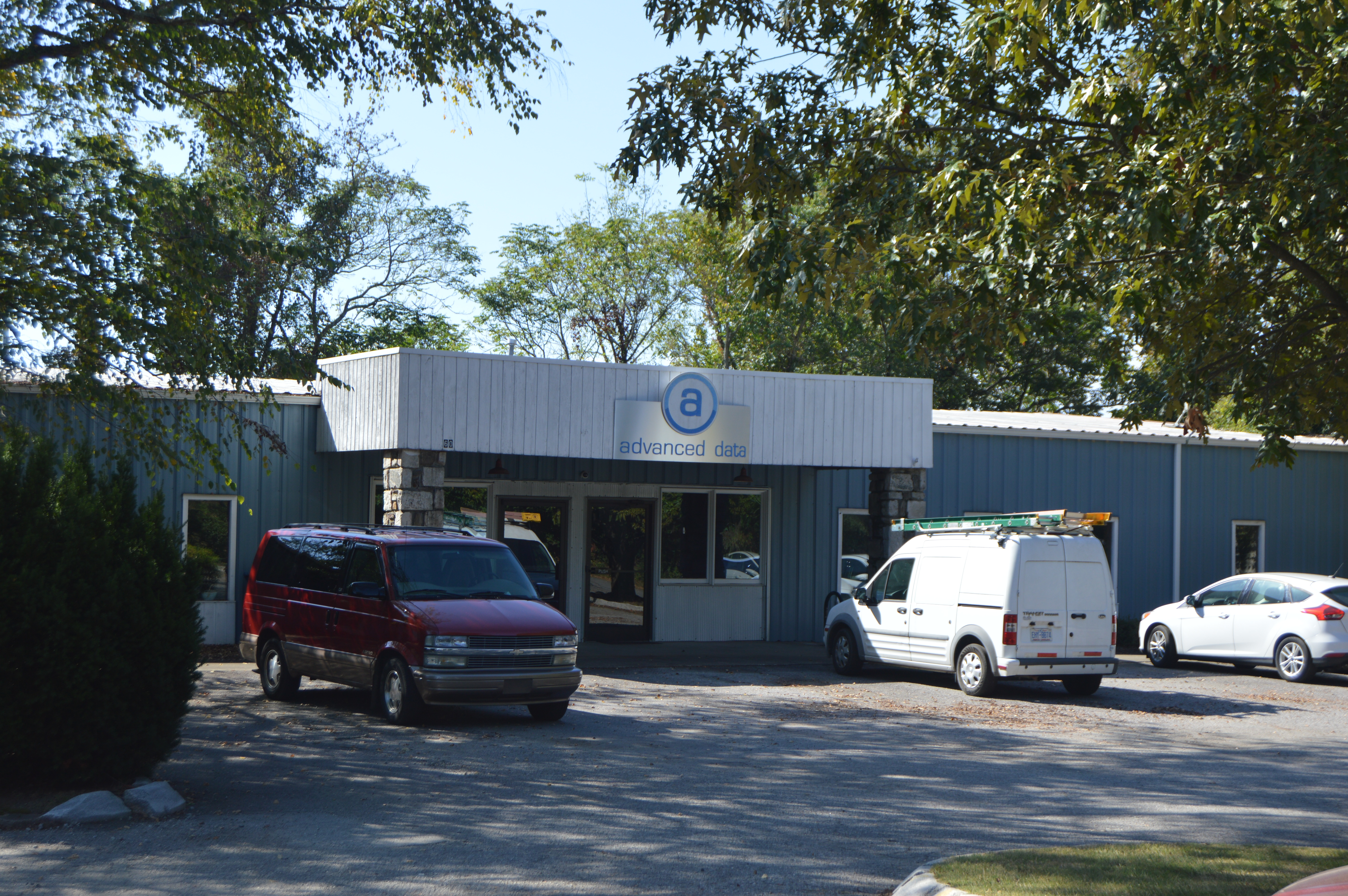
- Post-demolition building site

- Location within North Carolina Location within the United States
- Location: 60 Ravenscroft Dr., Asheville, North Carolina
- Coordinates: 35°35′25″N 82°33′12″W
- Area: 1 acre (0.40 ha)
- Built: 1887
- Architectural style: Queen Anne-Eastlake
- MPS: Asheville Historic and Architectural MRA
- NRHP reference No.: 79001683
- Added to NRHP: April 26, 1979

Schoenberger Hall was a historic residential building located at Asheville, Buncombe County, North Carolina. It was built in 1887, and was a 2 1/2-story, brick dwelling. It featured an Eastlake-detailed wraparound verandah and a slate-shingled mansard roof. The building was the former home of the Ravenscroft Associate Missions and Training School of the North Carolina Episcopal Diocese and the former residence of the Bishop of the Episcopal Diocese of Western North Carolina. The building has been demolished.

It was listed on the National Register of Historic Places in 1979.
