= Junius Horner =

The Right Reverend Junius Moore Horner
- Bishop of Western North Carolina
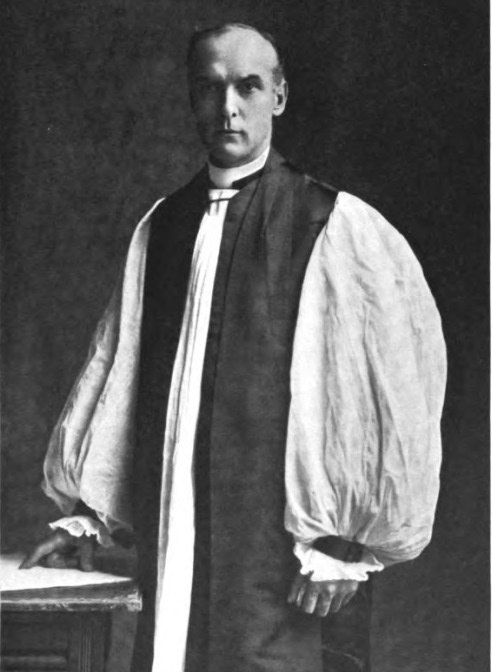
- Church: Episcopal Church
- Diocese: Western North Carolina
- Elected: 1922
- In office: 1922–1933
- Successor: Robert E. Gribbin
- Previous post: Missionary Bishop of Ashville (1898-1922)

Orders
- Ordination: May 24, 1891 by Theodore B. Lyman
- Consecration: December 28, 1898 by Joseph Blount Cheshire

Personal details
- Born: July 7, 1859 Oxford, North Carolina, United States
- Died: April 5, 1933 (aged 73) Asheville, North Carolina, United States
- Buried: Riverside Cemetery, Asheville, North Carolina
- Denomination: Anglican
- Parents: James Hunter Horner & Sophronia Moore
- Spouse: Eva Harker
- Children: 3 Junius Horner Jr (Jack)

Junius Moore Horner (July 7, 1859 – April 5, 1933) was the first bishop of the Diocese of Western North Carolina in The Episcopal Church.

== Early life and education ==
Horner was born on July 7, 1859, in Oxford, North Carolina, the son of James Hunter Horner and Sophronia Moore. He attended the Horner School and the University of Virginia where he was a classmate of Woodrow Wilson. He graduated with a Bachelor of Arts from Johns Hopkins University in 1885. He then studied at the General Theological Seminary and earned his Bachelor of Divinity in 1890. He was awarded a Doctor of Divinity by the University of the South in 1899.

== Ordained ministry ==
Horner was ordained deacon on June 1, 1890, and priest on May 24, 1891. He served his priestly ministry as principal of the Oxford School for Boys in Oxford, North Carolina, from 1890 till 1898. Horner married Eva Harker on December 14, 1892, and together had three children.

== Bishop ==
In 1898, the General Convention of The Episcopal Church elected Horner to organize the Missionary District of Asheville. George Vanderbilt personally pledged to pay for the new bishop's position. He was consecrated missionary bishop on December 28, 1898, by the Bishop of North Carolina Joseph Blount Cheshire. When the Missionary District of Asheville was organized into the Diocese of Western North Carolina, Horner became its first diocesan bishop. He remained at the diocese until his death in Asheville on April 5, 1933.
