= M. George Henry =

The Right Reverend Matthew George Henry D.D.
- Bishop of Western North Carolina
- Church: Episcopal Church
- Diocese: Western North Carolina
- Elected: May 14, 1948
- In office: 1948–1975
- Predecessor: Robert E. Gribbin
- Successor: William G. Weinhauer

Orders
- Ordination: May 23, 1936 by Edwin A. Penick
- Consecration: September 29, 1948 by Henry St. George Tucker

Personal details
- Born: October 25, 1910 Chapel Hill, North Carolina, United States
- Died: March 19, 1975 (aged 64) Asheville, North Carolina, United States
- Buried: Calvary Churchyard, Fletcher, North Carolina
- Denomination: Anglican
- Parents: George Kenneth Grant & Mary Elizabeth Harding
- Spouse: Cornelia Catharine Sprinkle
- Children: 4
- Education: University of North Carolina

Matthew George Henry (October 25, 1910 – March 19, 1975) was the third diocesan bishop of Western North Carolina in The Episcopal Church, serving from September 29, 1948, until his death.

== Early life and education ==
Henry was born on October 25, 1910, in Chapel Hill, North Carolina, the son of Dr George Kenneth Grant, professor of Latin and later assistant registrar at the University of North Carolina, and Mary Elizabeth Harding who was descendant from a line of Episcopal clergymen. Henry attended the public schools in Chapel Hill and then studied at the University of North Carolina at Chapel Hill from where he graduated with a Bachelor of Arts in chemistry in 1931. He became a member of Phi Beta Kappa, and after graduation he held a teaching fellowship at the University of South Carolina. He then attended the Virginia Theological Seminary from where he earned a Bachelor of Divinity in 1935.

== Ordained ministry ==
Henry was ordained deacon on June 16, 1935, in the Chapel of the Cross in Chapel Hill, North Carolina by Edwin A. Penick, Bishop of North Carolina. He then became curate at St Philip's Church in Durham, North Carolina and in November of that same year, he served at St Paul's Church in Winston-Salem, North Carolina. In 1936, he became deacon-in-charge of Christ Church in Walnut Cove, North Carolina, Messiah Church in Mayodan, North Carolina, St Philip's Church in Germantown, North Carolina, and Emmanuel Church in Stoneville, North Carolina. He was ordained priest in the Church of the Messiah, Mayodan, North Carolina on May 23, 1936, by Bishop Penick and became priest-in-charge of the church within which he served as deacon. That same year, in 1936, Henry transferred to Calvary Church in Tarboro, North Carolina to serve as its rector. In 1943, he left Tarboro and became rector of Christ Church in Charlotte, North Carolina.

== Bishop ==
On May 14, 1948, Henry was elected on the ninth ballot as the third Bishop of Western North Carolina, during the diocesan annual convention held in Asheville, North Carolina. He was consecrated on September 29, 1948, at Trinity Church in Asheville, North Carolina by Presiding Bishop Henry St. George Tucker. Henry died in office of a heart attack on March 19, 1975.
