= G. Porter Taylor =

Episcopalian bishop (born 1950)

The Right Reverend Granville Porter Taylor Ph.D.
- Bishop of Western North Carolina
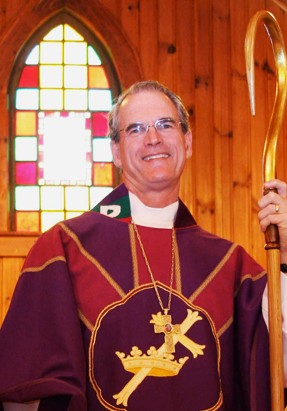
- Bishop Taylor in clerical robes
- Church: Episcopal Church
- Diocese: Western North Carolina
- Elected: 2004
- In office: 2004–2016
- Predecessor: Robert Hodges Johnson
- Successor: José Antonio McLoughlin
- Previous post: Rector of St. Gregory Episcopal Church

Orders
- Ordination: April 13, 1994 by Frank Allan
- Consecration: September 18, 2004 by Robert Carroll Johnson Jr.

Personal details
- Born: Granville Porter Taylor; September 17, 1950 (age 76) Rock Hill, South Carolina, United States
- Denomination: Anglican
- Residence: Asheville, North Carolina
- Spouse: Jo Abbott Taylor
- Children: Arthur Taylor and Marie Taylor
- Education: University of North Carolina at Chapel Hill

Granville Porter Taylor (born September 17, 1950) is the sixth and immediate past Episcopal Bishop of Western North Carolina. In March 2015 he announced his intent to retire. He was succeeded as bishop by the Rt. Rev. José Antonio McLoughlin. Taylor was appointed for a two-year term as Assisting Bishop in 2020 for the Episcopal Diocese of Virginia.

== Biography ==
Taylor was born in Rock Hill, South Carolina, but raised in Asheville, North Carolina. He earned his Bachelor of Arts degree in English from the University of North Carolina at Chapel Hill in 1972, followed by a Master of Arts in English from the University of South Carolina (1974) and a Ph.D. in Theology and Literature from Emory University (1983).

In 1993, he received a Master of Divinity from the University of the South, Sewanee and was ordained a deacon. He was ordained a priest on April 13, 1994, and served seven years as rector of St. Gregory the Great Church in Athens, Georgia.

He was consecrated as the fifth Bishop of the Diocese of Western North Carolina on September 18, 2004. The 999th bishop consecrated in the Episcopal Church, he was consecrated by Robert Carroll Johnson Jr., Robert Hodges Johnson, Frank Allan, Michael Curry, and J. Neil Alexander at the Asheville Civic Center.

He is the author of To Dream as God Dreams: Sermons of Hope, Conversion, and Community and From Anger to Zion: An Alphabet of Faith. He and his wife, Jo Abbott Taylor (a research nurse), married in 1972; they have two children, Arthur and Marie. Arthur achieved his graduate degree (Ph.D.) in psychology at New York University, and currently lives in Atlanta, Georgia with his wife and two children. Bishop Taylor's daughter, Marie, who spent a year at Randolph College (formally Randolph-Macon Women's College), transferred and graduated from Western Carolina University, with a B.S. in Anthropology, and recently finished her master's degree in GIS from the University of Southern California.

In 2016, Taylor was named the Visiting Professor of Episcopal Studies at Wake Forest University's School of Divinity.

Episcopal Church (USA) titles
Preceded by Robert Hodges Johnson	Bishop of Western North Carolina; 2004–2016	Succeeded by José Antonio McLoughlin
