= William G. Weinhauer =

4th bishop of the Episcopal Diocese of Western North Carolina

The Right Reverend William Gillette Weinhauer D.Th., D.D.
- Bishop of Western North Carolina
- Church: Episcopal Church
- Diocese: Western North Carolina
- Elected: May 1973
- In office: 1975–1990
- Predecessor: M. George Henry
- Successor: Robert Hodges Johnson
- Previous post: Coadjutor Bishop of Western North Carolina (1973-1975)

Orders
- Ordination: October 1951 by James P. deWolfe
- Consecration: September 6, 1973 by John E. Hines

Personal details
- Born: December 3, 1924 New York City, New York, United States
- Died: January 26, 2007 (aged 82) Asheville, North Carolina, United States
- Denomination: Anglican
- Parents: Nicholas Alfred Weinhauer & Florence Anastasia Davis
- Spouse: Jean Roberta Shanks
- Children: 3
- Education: Trinity College

William Gillette Weinhauer (December 3, 1924 – January 26, 2007) was fourth bishop of the Episcopal Diocese of Western North Carolina from March 1975 to January 1990.

== Early life and education ==
Weinhauer was born on December 3, 1924, in New York City, the son of Nicholas Alfred Weinhauer (1891-1972) and Florence Anastasia Davis (1891-1966). He was educated at the public schools of New York, before attending Trinity College, from where he graduated with a Bachelor of Science in 1948. Prior to that, he served three years in the U.S. Navy during World War II. He also studied at the General Theological Seminary, from where he earned a Bachelor of Sacred Theology in 1952, a Master of Sacred Theology in 1956, and a Doctor of Theology in 1970. He was also the recipient of two honorary Doctor of Divinity degrees, one from the University of the South in 1974, and the other from Lenoir–Rhyne University in 1985. Weinhauer married Jean Roberta Shanks (1925-2016) on March 20, 1948, and they had three daughters.

== Ordained ministry ==
Weinhauer was ordained deacon in March 1951 and was priest in October of the same year by Bishop James P. deWolfe of Long Island. He served as curate at the Church of the Resurrection in Queens, New York City from 1951 till 1952, when he became victor of St George's Church in The Bronx. Between 1952 and 1953, he also served as chaplain at New York University and from 1952 till 1956, chaplain at Hunter College. Between 1953 and 1956, he served at the Church of St James the Less in Scarsdale, New York as Director of Christian Education.

In 1956 he moved to Quezon City, Philippines, to become Professor of New Testament at St Andrew's Theological Seminary. In 1960 he moved back to the United States and in 1961, he became Professor of New Testament at the General Theological Seminary. In 1970, he became rector of Christ Church in Poughkeepsie, New York.

== Bishop ==
In May 1973, Weinhauer was elected Coadjutor Bishop of Western North Carolina and was consecrated on September 6, 1973, in the Civic Auditorium, Asheville, North Carolina, with Presiding Bishop John E. Hines as chief consecrator. He succeeded as diocesan in March 1975. During his episcopacy, Weinhauer was active in ecumenical circles serving as a member of the Episcopal Church's Standing Committee for Ecumenical Relations, member of the Anglican-Roman Catholic conversations, and co-chair of the Lutheran-Episcopal Dialogue. He retired in 1990.
