= Robert Hodges Johnson =

American Episcopal bishop (1934–2025)

The Right Reverend Robert Hodges Johnson
- Bishop of Western North Carolina
- Church: Episcopal Church
- Diocese: Western North Carolina
- Elected: November 1988
- In office: 1990–2004
- Predecessor: William G. Weinhauer
- Successor: G. Porter Taylor
- Previous post: Coadjutor Bishop of Western North Carolina (1989-1990)

Orders
- Ordination: 1963
- Consecration: March 11, 1989 by Edmond L. Browning

Personal details
- Born: October 1, 1934 Jacksonville, Florida, US
- Died: October 7, 2025 (aged 91) Asheville, North Carolina
- Denomination: Anglican
- Parents: William Weakley Johnson & Marjorie Philips
- Spouse: Julie
- Children: 2

Robert Hodges Johnson (October 1, 1934 - October 7, 2025) was an American prelate who served as the fifth Bishop of Western North Carolina in The Episcopal Church.

== Biography ==
Johnson was born on October 1, 1934, in Jacksonville, Florida, the son of William Weakley Johnson and Marjorie Philips. He served in the United States Army between 1957 and 1960. He earned a Bachelor of Science and a Bachelor of Arts from the University of Florida, a Master of Divinity the Virginia Theological Seminary, and a Doctor of Divinity from the University of the South and the Virginia Theological Seminary, respectively.

After ordination in 1963, he served at the Church of Our Saviour and St George's Church, both in Jacksonville, Florida. He also served at the church of St. Martin in the Highlands, in Jacksonville, before serving as a senior canon at St John's Cathedral. Prior to his election as bishop, he served as rector of the Church of the Holy Innocents in Atlanta, Georgia, a post he held for 17 years.

In November 1988, Johnson was elected Coadjutor Bishop of Western North Carolina. He was consecrated on March 11, 1989, in the Asheville Civic Center, and he succeeded as diocesan in 1990. He retired in 2004. Johnson served as Interim Bishop of Southern Virginia in 2006, and was named Assisting Bishop of Pittsburgh in 2008.

Johnson died in Asheville, North Carolina on October 7, 2025.
