= St. Luke's Episcopal Church (Asheville, North Carolina) =

Church in Asheville, North Carolina

- St. Luke’s Episcopal Church
- U.S. National Register of Historic Places
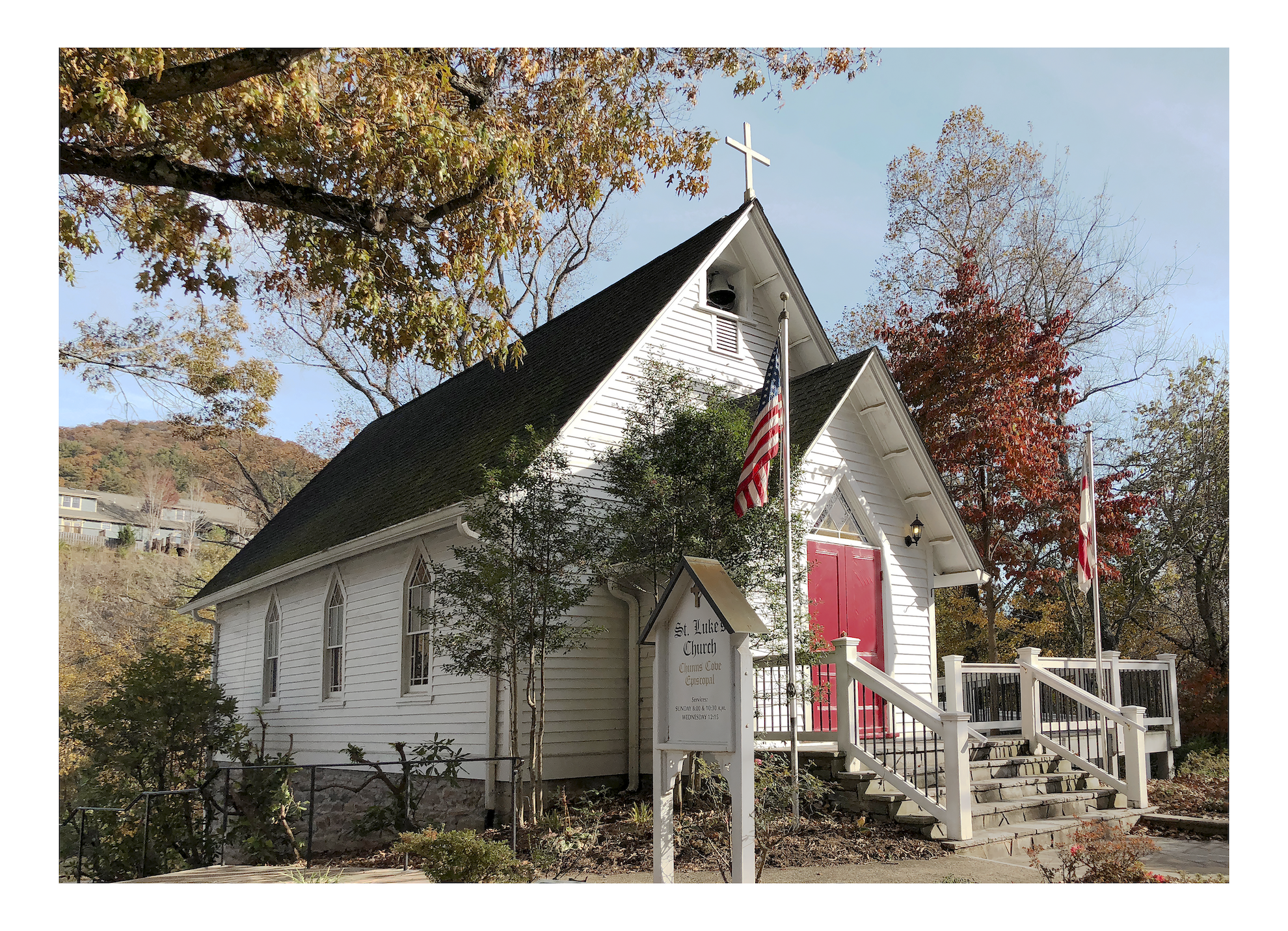
- St. Luke’s Episcopal Church was built in 1894

- Location within North Carolina Location within the United States
- Location: 219 Chunns Cove Rd., Asheville, North Carolina
- Coordinates: 35°36′7″N 82°31′53″W
- Built: 1894
- Architect: E. J. Armstrong
- Architectural style: Late Gothic Revival (Carpenter Gothic)
- NRHP reference No.: 97001198
- Added to NRHP: September 30, 1997

St. Luke’s Episcopal Church is a historic Carpenter Gothic–style Episcopal church building located at 219 Chunns Cove Road, in the Chunn's Cove neighborhood of Asheville, North Carolina. Built in 1894, at a cost of $728, St. Luke’s was designed by E. J. Armstrong, a member of the congregation. Its first service was held September 17, 1894.

On September 30, 1997, St. Luke’s Episcopal Church was added to the National Register of Historic Places.

== History of the Building ==
In 1847, the Reverend Jarvis Buxton came to Asheville, then a community of about 800 people, to become the Rector of Trinity Church. A missionary-minded priest, the Rev. Buxton was responsible for beginning the work of the Episcopal Church in Chunns Cove, Beaverdam, West Asheville, and Waynesville. St. Luke’s Episcopal Church was designed by E. J. Armstrong, a member of the congregation, and it was constructed in 1894, at a cost of $728. The first church service was held on July 9, 1894. Note: In recognition of the building's 125th anniversary, the rector will employ the 1898 Book of Common Prayer to repeat this "first sermon" on the exact day in 2023. For more about this year's special events, browse the St. Luke's website calendar.

In the 1940s, the Reverend James B. Sill obtained two, possibly three, stained-glass panels, or “lights,” that had once been installed in St. Chrysostom‘s Chapel in New York City. That chapel, built and maintained by Trinity Chapel, had been demolished in 1929 because it had sustained structural damage from a nearby subway. The distinctive style of the stained glass leads this researcher to conclude that it was designed and manufactured in the late 19th century by Heaton, Butler and Bayne of London. One of the lights is installed in St. Luke‘s but another is broken—perhaps during the initial journey to western North Carolina—and is stored at the church.

From an item published in the Asheville Citizen, dated January 11, 1942:

WINDOW PRESENTED ST. LUKE‘S—The Rev. J. B. Sill, rector of St. Luke‘s Episcopal church, Chunn‘s cove, inspects the stained glass window which was presented the church by the vestry of Trinity church, New York city, in memory of his father, the Rev. Thomas Henry Sill. The window, which was taken from St. Chrysostam's [sic] chapel, owned by Trinity, shows Christ blessing little children. The elder Sill was vicar of St. Chrysostam‘s [sic] for many years before it was torn down. The window will be dedicated at 3 p. m. today by Bishop R. E. Gribbin.

The original deed for the land was professionally restored by licensed archivists in 2013, and now hangs in the climate-controlled parish house, to protect the historic document from environmental fluctuations. A framed facsimile hangs in the church’s nave.

== Present Day ==
St. Luke’s is a small but active parish in the Episcopal Diocese of Western North Carolina. The Reverend Patricia (Patty) Mouer was installed as rector on December 4, 2004. She retired in July, 2025.

Holy Eucharist services are held at 8:00 am and 10:30 am; studies and classes begin at 9:00 am; and a coffee hour follows the later Sunday service. A healing service is held on Wednesdays at 12:15 pm. Special services for Church holy days are also held throughout the year, most notably during Lent, the Easter Season, the Christmas Season, and others, as noted on the church website and its Facebook page. The parish house is located on the same lot, where adult formation classes and children‘s Bible studies are held; the rector‘s offices are also there.

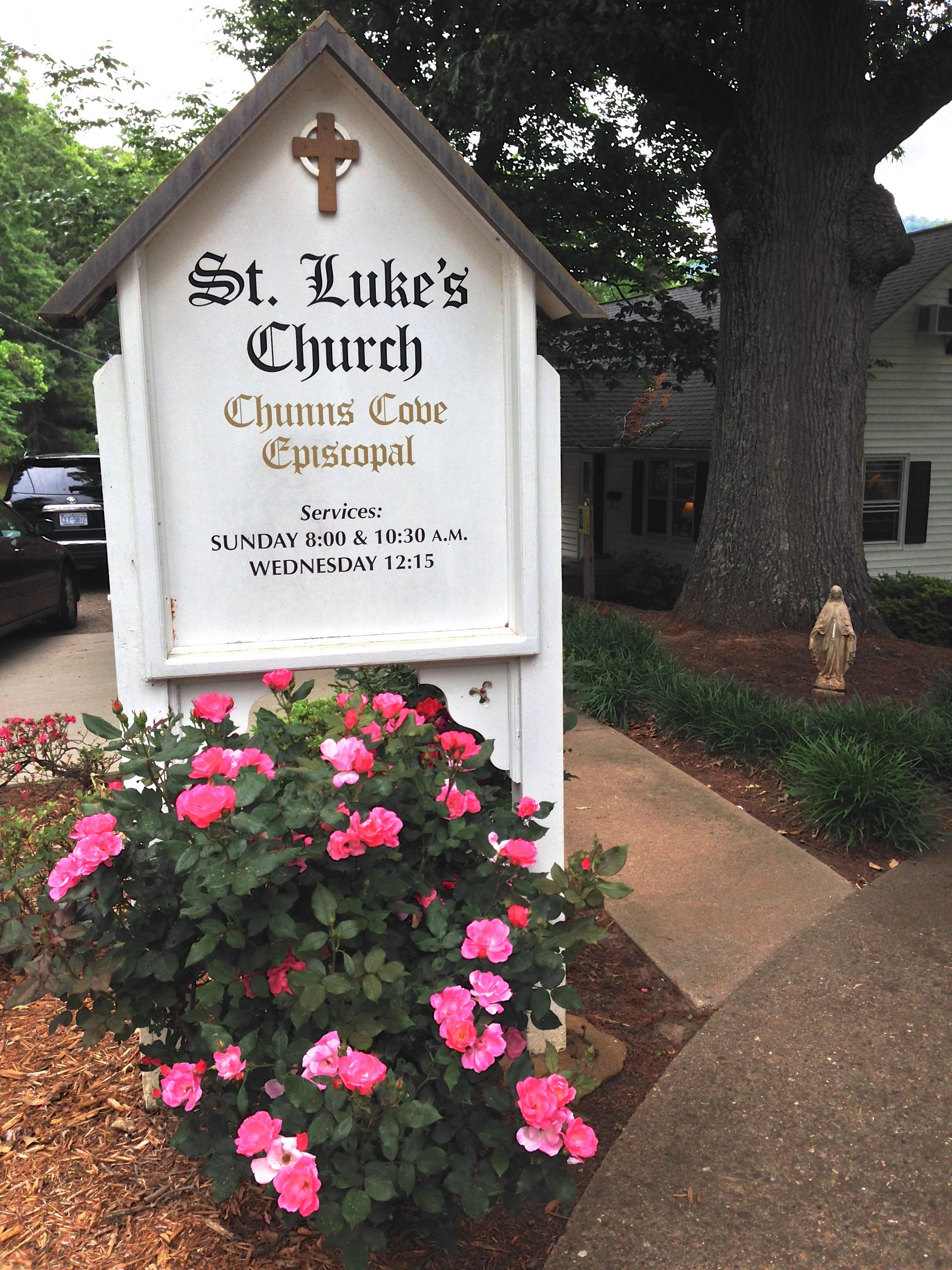
The sign's profile echoes the church's Carpenter Gothic–style roofline.

In keeping with the Episcopal Diocese of Western North Carolina‘s commitment to social justice, St. Luke's parishioners serve the larger community in many ways. St. Luke‘s allows the newly built Hamilton Hall to be used by various recovery groups.

=== Stewardship ===
One boundary of the church property lies along Ross Creek, a tributary to the French Broad River. Since the late 2000s, parishioners have been removing invasive plants (mainly kudzu) from the creek's banks. In 2012, the church partnered with RiverLink to install native plants that help filter pollutants from rainwater as it runs off roofs and roadways on its way to Ross Creek. An info kiosk, installed by a local Scout troop, describes the project and recognizes St. Luke's involvement of other eco-partnerships.

Today, the ongoing work to keep back the kudzu, its environmentally friendly plantings, and low-impact artificial lighting (despite significant development in East Asheville over the last few decades) has earned St. Luke’s the honor of being certified in the North Carolina Wildlife Federation's F.A.I.T.H. program (Fellowship Actions Impacting The Habitat). The NCWF “recognizes and certifies places of worship of all denominations that meet the requirements for a wildlife-friendly habitat. The certification celebrates the beauty and importance of nature and focuses on shared responsibility of wildlife stewardship.” Black bears and wild turkeys are sometimes seen along the property's western boundary as they move to and from Ross Creek.

=== Cemetery and Labyrinth ===
A consecrated cemetery and the Garden of the Resurrection, a cremains burial area, lie just west of the church, near the western property boundary. Simple carved gravestones, cut from local stone, date as early as the mid–19th century.

A low-profile labyrinth, outlined in smooth river stones, was installed on the grounds in 2014. All are welcome to walk the paths in contemplation. The church offers a guide to using the labyrinth.
