= Nebo, North Carolina =

- Census-designated place
- Location within North Carolina Location within the United States
- Coordinates: 35.715°N 81.93111°W
- Country: United States
- State: North Carolina
- County: McDowell

Area
  - Total: 5.30 sq mi (13.72 km^{2})
  - Land: 5.30 sq mi (13.72 km^{2})
  - Water: 0 sq mi (0.00 km^{2})
- Elevation: 1,322 ft (403 m)

Population (2020)
  - Total: 1,790
  - Density: 338/sq mi (130.5/km^{2})
- Time zone: UTC-5 (Eastern (EST))
  - Summer (DST): UTC-4 (EDT)
- ZIP Code: 28761
- GNIS feature ID: 2812797
- FIPS Code: 37-46100

Nebo is an unincorporated community and census-designated place (CDP) in the Nebo Township of eastern McDowell County, North Carolina, United States. It was first listed as a CDP in the 2020 census with a population of 1,790.

== History ==
Nebo is named after a Methodist campground that existed before the Civil War. The Western North Carolina Railroad named its depot "Nebo" after the campground. The community was incorporated in 1909, with the repeal of the charter coming in 1943.

== Geography ==
Nebo is in eastern McDowell County, served by U.S. Route 70, which leads west 5 miles (8 km) to Marion, the county seat, and east 16 miles (26 km) to Morganton.

According to the U.S. Census Bureau, the Nebo CDP has an area of 5.3 square miles (13.7 km^{2}), all land. The center of Nebo sits on a ridge which drains south to Thompsons Fork and north to Shadrick Creek, all part of the Catawba River watershed.

== Attractions ==
The primary attraction in the Nebo area is Lake James. Lake James State Park is located on its southern shore, 3 miles (5 km) northeast of Nebo.

The Nebo Historic Springbox is located between Nebo Elementary School and the railroad. It is one of the few remaining structures from Nebo's original incorporation as a town. The Nebo Historic Springbox was a meeting place for the community and the primary water source for the original Nebo School building.

== Education ==
Nebo Elementary School is located in the community. It serves children in kindergarten through fifth grade. The school was part of the last junior high system in the state of North Carolina which was replaced by the standard middle school model in the 2015–2016 school year. Before being incorporated as an elementary school, Nebo was a high school. Part of the high school burnt down years ago, but the lunchroom remained.

== Location ==
The heart of Nebo is considered to be at the Nebo post office. However, the area served by the Nebo post office (ZIP Code 28761) extends north into Burke County, serving homes on Lake James, and south as far as the Rutherford County line. A smaller land area is protected by the Nebo Volunteer Fire Department, while the area for which population statistics are tabulated, the Nebo Census-Designated Place, is smaller still, extending north to just beyond Ned McGimsey Road and Ball Lane, and south to Thompsons Fork.

== Demographics ==
Historical population
Census	Pop.	Note	%±
2020	1,790		—
U.S. Decennial Census; 2020

=== 2020 census ===
Nebo CDP, North Carolina – Racial and Ethnic Composition (NH = Non-Hispanic) Note: the US Census treats Hispanic/Latino as an ethnic category. This table excludes Latinos from the racial categories and assigns them to a separate category. Hispanics/Latinos may be of any race.
Race / Ethnicity	Pop 2020	% 2020
White alone (NH)	1,616	90.28%
Black or African American alone (NH)	37	2.07%
Native American or Alaska Native alone (NH)	9	0.50%
Asian alone (NH)	20	1.12%
Pacific Islander alone (NH)	0	0.00%
Some Other Race alone (NH)	1	0.06%
Mixed Race/Multi-Racial (NH)	57	3.18%
Hispanic or Latino (any race)	50	2.79%
Total	1,790	100.00%

Note: the US Census treats Hispanic/Latino as an ethnic category. This table excludes Latinos from the racial categories and assigns them to a separate category. Hispanics/Latinos can be of any race.
