= St. Paul's Episcopal Church (Morganton, North Carolina) =

Coordinates: 35°45′25″N 81°49′22″W

Saint Paul's Episcopal Church is a century-old Episcopal parish on the eastern shore of Lake James near Morganton, North Carolina. It part of the Episcopal Diocese of Western North Carolina and is noted for its ministry to older adults in the Lake James community, especially through a program called "Happy Tuesday". The church reported 105 members in 2017 and 68 members in 2023; no membership statistics were reported in 2024 parochial reports. Plate and pledge income reported for the congregation in 2024 was $92,484 with average Sunday attendance (ASA) of 36 persons.

== History ==
Saint Paul's was founded in 1906 by Grace Episcopal Church, as a mission to the remote western portion of Burke County. The new parish included a sanctuary, an orphanage and a school. Prior to the establishment of public education throughout the county, Saint Paul's school was the only grade school in the area. The church's clergy were also instrumental in establishing The Patterson School for Boys (now known as The Patterson School) in nearby Lenoir. The school and orphanage stayed open until 1926, when public education was established throughout the county, and as people moved to the area in the effort to build Lake James. From 1951 to 1993, Saint Paul's was yoked with its sister parish, Saint Mary's Church.

The original church structure was destroyed by fire on December 31, 1979. Though initial plans were not to rebuild the church, members displayed their devotion to the parish's survival to the diocese. This effort, along with a donation of land, allowed Saint Paul's to be rebuilt in its current location.

In 1993, Saint Paul's became an independent parish, and completed a fellowship hall in 1996. The hall was named "Fitzgerald Hall" in 2004 in honor of its former rector, the Rev. John W. Fitzgerald. The Alfred T.K. Zadig Sr. Library was completed in 2008.

== Current data ==
Saint Paul's Episcopal Church currently consists of about 75 members. Its liturgy contains some Anglo-Catholic features and the church stresses its ties to the Anglican Communion. Dr. Rev. Gary Butterworth is serving as Priest in Charge.

November 2021 a 3 Rank Wicks Pipe organ was Donated to the Church in addition to a 1919 Chickering piano was donated.
