= José Antonio McLoughlin =

Bishop of the Episcopal Diocese of Western North Carolina

The Right Reverend José Antonio McLoughlin
- Chief Administrative Officer of the Episcopal Church
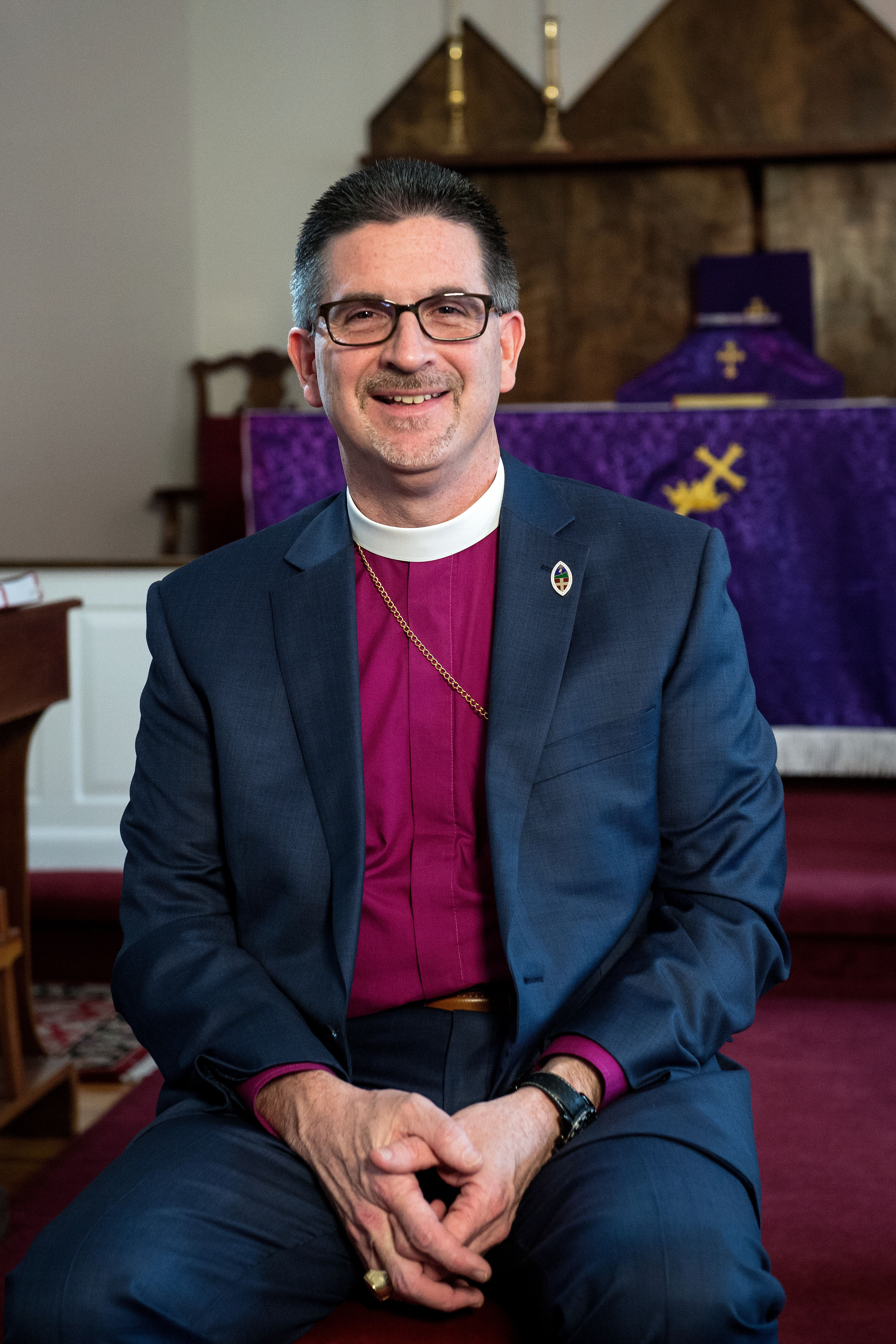
- Church: Episcopal Church
- Appointed: June 2026
- Previous post: Bishop of Western North Carolina

Orders
- Ordination: 2005
- Consecration: October 1, 2016 by Michael Curry

Personal details
- Born: May 21, 1969 (age 57) San Juan, Puerto Rico
- Denomination: Anglican
- Parents: William Alexander McLoughlin & Caridad Navarrete
- Spouse: Laurel
- Children: 2
- Education: University of Central Florida

José Antonio McLoughlin (born May 21, 1969) is the seventh and current bishop of the Episcopal Diocese of Western North Carolina, United States. After studies at Virginia Theological Seminary, he was ordained to the diaconate and priesthood in 2005.

He was elected bishop on June 25, 2016, at special electing convention of the diocese at Trinity Church in Asheville. On October 1, 2016, Bishop McLoughlin was consecrated bishop by The Most Reverend Michael Curry (bishop), 27th Presiding Bishop of the Episcopal Church, becoming the first bishop in Western North Carolina of Hispanic descent. The consecration was conducted at the Kimmel Arena located on the campus of the University of North Carolina at Asheville.

== Early life ==
Bishop José was born May 21, 1969, in San Juan, Puerto Rico. When he was young, his family, including José, his brother and parents moved to Orlando, Florida.

José's father, William Alexander McLoughlin, was born and raised in The Bronx. His mother, Caridad Navarrete was born in Santiago de Cuba and left Cuba in 1961.

== Law enforcement career ==
After graduating from Oviedo High School, McLoughlin attended the University of Central Florida where he received a BA degree in Criminal Justice. After graduating, McLoughlin worked as a Sheriff's Deputy in the Orange County Sheriff's Office in Florida. After a few years in Florida, McLoughlin moved to Northern Virginia where he worked for the United States Department of Justice.

== Religious career ==
After 13 years in criminal justice, McLoughlin enrolled at Virginia Theological Seminary. There he earned a Master of Divinity degree, and was ordained as a priest and a deacon in the Episcopal Church in 2005. After graduating, McLoughlin served the Episcopal Diocese of Virginia and the Episcopal Diocese of Southeast Florida before becoming the Canon to the Ordinary & Chief of Staff for The Rt. Rev. Edward J. Konieczny in the Episcopal Diocese of Oklahoma in 2008.

=== Election as bishop ===
On June 25, 2016, Canon McLoughlin was elected as the Bishop of the Episcopal Diocese of Western North Carolina.

The diocese contains 63 parishes, 6 summer chapels, a Diocesan School - Christ School (North Carolina) in Asheville; A retirement community, Deerfield, Asheville; 2 conference centers - Lake Logan, and Valle Crucis; a thriving summer camp, Camp Henry, and over 15,000 members. The diocese is divided into six deaneries. Its cathedral was the Cathedral of All Souls in Asheville, located in Biltmore Village.

He stepped down on June 2026 after the Presiding Bishop Sean Rowe invited him to become the first Chief Administrative Officer for The Episcopal church.

Episcopal Church (USA) titles
Preceded by G. Porter Taylor	Bishop of Western North Carolina; 2016-present	Incumbent
