= McKendree Long =

American painter

McKendree Long (1888–1976) was an American minister and painter.

== Life ==
Educated at Horner Military Academy in Oxford and at Davidson College, he went on to attend classes at the Art Students League in New York. Upon winning a scholarship for study in Europe, he travelled there, learning an academic style of portrait painting. He returned to the United States, working as a professional portraitist in New York City and North Carolina. Long went on to serve in World War I, and abandoned his artistic career afterwards, being ordained as a Presbyterian minister in 1922, becoming an evangelist in the southern U.S. In his seventies, Reverend Long began painting again, in a far more surrealistic fashion that widely differed from the style of his previous portraiture.

Grandson Ben Long (born 1945) is also an alumnus of the Art Students League in New York and is known for his drawings and fresco work.

== Archival collections ==
The Presbyterian Historical Society in Philadelphia, Pennsylvania, has McKendree Robbins Long's Papers, including written and printed materials; original drawings, sketches, and illustrations; a folder of photographs; and seven sermons recorded on Duodisc electric transcription discs. Long embellished a portion of his handwritten work with imaginative illustrations and/or illumination, making this collection, and Long, particularly unique.
