= Fonta Flora State Trail =

State park in North Carolina, United States

- Length: 19 miles (31 km)
- Location: North Carolina, United States
- Established: 2015
- Designation: State Trail (North Carolina)
- Trailheads: Asheville, Morganton
- Use: Hiking and bicycling
- Season: Year-round
- Sights: Lake James
- Surface: Asphalt, Natural
- Maintained by: North Carolina Division of Parks and Recreation
- Website: https://trails.nc.gov/state-trails/fonta-flora-state-trail

The Fonta Flora State Trail is a unit of the North Carolina state park system in Buncombe, McDowell, and Burke Counties, North Carolina, in the United States, and it consists of 90 acres (36 ha) of conservation land and 33 miles of designated multi-use trail. The State Trail is planned as a continuous route of 100 miles for hikers and cyclists from Asheville to Morganton, with a loop around Lake James. The trail is a collaboration between local governments, local land conservancies the US Forest Service, and the state, with development coordinated by the North Carolina Division of Parks and Recreation (NCDPR). and the Friends of Fonta Flora State Trail, Inc

== History ==
In 2004, Duke Energy's Crescent Resources made a deal with NCDPR to sell undeveloped land around Lake James for an expansion of Lake James State Park, and they offered trail easements for the Overmountain Victory National Historic Trail on their properties. Two years later, Duke Energy started the process of re-licensing their hydroelectric dams on Lake James with the Federal Energy Regulatory Commission. Public comments during the re-licensing encouraged Duke Energy to develop a loop trail around Lake James, which would connect all communities, recreational, commercial and residential properties, the Overmountain Victory Trail, and local/state parks along the lake.

The loop trail concept was initially called the Lake James Loop Trail, but it was later renamed after the community of Fonta Flora, which was partially submerged with the creation of Lake James.

On June 15, 2015, the General Assembly of North Carolina established the Fonta Flora State Trail, and directed NCDPR to coordinate its development. In 2019, Friends of Fonta Flora State Trail was established to maintain the trail; the organization has access to funding and grants to help develop the trail, and is governed by a board of directors.

During the master planning process for the state trail, its concept was expanded with connections from Lake James to Asheville and Morganton.

On April 17, 2018, the Foothills Conservancy donated 90 acres (36 ha) of undeveloped land near Old Fort to NCDPR for the trail. The conservancy also obtained trail easements from adjoining property owners for future construction of the trail. The property follows a ridge near Camp Grier, and the Foothills Conservancy will manage it on NCDPR's behalf.

== List of designated sections ==
NCDPR has designated several existing trails as part of the Fonta Flora Trail (from west to east):

Wilma Dykeman Greenway in Asheville
Oaks Trail in Black Mountain
Point Lookout Trail in Pisgah National Forest
Copper Ridge in Old Fort
Fonta Flora State Trail at Greenlee Park in McDowell County
Joseph McDowell Historical Catawba Greenway in Marion
Downtown Marion
South Wimba Trail at Lake James
Long Arm Trail at Lake James
Linville River at Lake James
Linville Boat Ramp at Lake James
Covered Bridge at Lake James
Lake James Loop at Flora County Park in Burke County
Lake James East at Lake James
Catawba River Greenway in Morganton
