= Ben Long (American painter) =

American painter

Ben Long (born 1945) is an American painter and the grandson of noted artist McKendree Robbins Long.

== Background ==
At 18, Long followed his father's footsteps to the University of North Carolina at Chapel Hill, where he majored in Creative Writing under the guidance of his friend and advisor Reynolds Price. Upon completing his University coursework at the insistence of his advisor Long moved to New York to immerse himself in the study of fine art.

In NYC, Long became a member of the Art Students League of New York, studying under the guidance of such notable artists as Robert Beverly Hale and Frank Mason. Then, in 1969, Long preempted the draft by enlisting in the U.S. Marine Corps. He served just over two tours of duty in Vietnam as a Marine Corps Combat Officer; during his last tour he served as Commander of the Combat Art Team, and much of his work from that period is now on display at the Smithsonian Institution of Washington, D.C.

Upon leaving Vietnam, Long traveled to Florence, Italy, to apprentice himself to internationally renowned Maestro Pietro Annigoni. Long committed himself to Annigoni for almost eight years. His apprenticeship culminated in 1976, when he was awarded the prestigious Leonardo da Vinci International Art Award.

In the late 1970s and early 1980s, Ben Long and some of his students painted wet plaster frescoes on the walls of the two historic Ashe County, North Carolina churches that form Holy Communion Episcopal Parish. Later, in 1986, he would produce a three-part fresco for St. Peter's Catholic Church in Charlotte, North Carolina.

In 1984, Long moved to France where, for the next 14 years, he split time between Paris and the Gard region of Provence. By the time of the move, Long had completed several frescoes in Italy - including a joint fresco with Annigoni and the only work by a non-Italian at the Abbey of Montecassino. These works set the stage for several major fresco projects in the U.S. (13 to this day) including a dome and the largest secular fresco in the United States.

There have been in depth documentaries produced about two of his frescoes, these include Chapel of the Prodigal (completed with James Daniel, Roger Nelson, and Charles Kapsner) and Shadow into light, both of which were produced by A New Light Productions, Inc. The videos depict the painting of Return of the Prodigal in Montreat, North Carolina and Suffer the Little Children in Crossnore, NC respectively.

In addition to his prolific fresco work, Long has had works in the Royal Academy as well as the Royal Portrait Society (London, UK). He has exhibited in Florence, London, Paris, Atlanta, San Francisco, New York, North Carolina, and South Carolina, and is represented in major collections throughout Europe and the Americas. He has lived and worked in Europe for over thirty years and now divides his time between Europe and the United States.

In 2001, Long was awarded the coveted Arthur Ross Award for Excellence in the Classical Tradition (Classical America, New York, New York) by Philippe de Montebello (current and longest-serving Curator of the Metropolitan Museum of Art). Mr. de Montebello has referred to Ben Long as one of the greatest draftsmen of the 20th Century.

In 2002, Ben Long received the Distinguished Alumnus Award from his alma mater, the University of North Carolina at Chapel Hill. In 2005, the Art Renewal Center added Ben Long to its Trademarked list of "Living Masters". Reynolds Price memorialized the pair's friendship by publishing a poem entitled "Ben Long's Drawing of Me".

== Selected works ==
=== Selected collections ===
- The Fremantle Collection, Florence, Italy
- The Josefowitz Collection, Lausanne, Switzerland
- The Getty Collection, San Francisco, California
- The Christie Miller Collection, London, England
- The Thane of Cawdor Collection, Scotland
- The Annigoni Collection, Florence, Italy
- The Sullivan Collection: Paris, France; Miami, Florida; New York, New York
- The Stillman Collection, Amenia, New York
- The Dalton Collection, Charlotte, North Carolina
- The Governor's Mansion Portrait Collection, Raleigh, North Carolina
- The McColl Collection, Charlotte, North Carolina
- Harvard Business School, Cambridge, Massachusetts
- The Wells Collection, Charlotte, North Carolina
- Bank of America Corporate Collection, Charlotte, North Carolina
- The Mint Museum of Art Collection, Charlotte, North Carolina
- United States Marine Corps Historical Museum, Washington, District of Columbia

=== Selected portrait commissions ===
- Gov. Jim Hunt of N.C. (Governor’s Mansion Official Portrait)
- Gordon Getty and sons
- Hugh McColl (Former President & CEO of Bank of America)
- Mr. and Mrs. C.D. Spangler (Portrait for the Harvard Business School Spangler Student Center)
- Musician Boz Scaggs and wife
- Philanthropist Chauncey Stillman
- Author and Poet Reynolds Price
- Author Danielle Steele and family

=== Selected fresco sites ===
- Basilica of the Montecassino Abbey, Chapel of St. John the Baptist, Montecassino, Italy
- Buriano, Station of the Cross, Florence, Italy
- Santa Maria del Buon Consiglio (w/ Annigoni), Ponte Buggionese, Italy
- Monastery of St. Francis of Assisi, Monte Catini Terme, Italy
- Self-Portrait Fresco, Private Collection, Paris, France
- Wethersfield Estate (Collaboration with Maestro Pietro Annigoni), Amenia, New York
- Bank of America Corporate Center (largest secular fresco in U.S.), Charlotte, North Carolina
- TransAmerica Dome, Charlotte, North Carolina
- City of Morganton Municipal Auditorium, Morganton, North Carolina
- First Presbyterian Church, Charlotte, North Carolina
- Montreat Chapel of the Prodigal, Montreat, North Carolina
- Statesville Civic Center, Statesville, North Carolina
- Law Enforcement Center, Charlotte, North Carolina
- St. Paul's Episcopal Church, Wilkesboro, North Carolina
- St. Peter's Catholic Church, Charlotte, North Carolina (fresco destroyed in 2002 due to dynamite blast vibrations in a construction area near the church as well as water seeping in behind the wall).

-Most of these frescoes were completed with Long's team Charles Kapsner, Roger Nelson, and James Daniel.

== Bibliography ==
- Dodson, James, and Floyd Jillson. The Renaissance at Beaver Creek and Glendale Springs. Atlanta, Ga: [Atlanta Newspapers], 1983. Notes: Caption title. Detached from: Atlanta weekly. (Aug. 7, 1983). "Photography by Floyd Jillson"—Page 23. Pictures and information about frescoes by Ben Long located in two churches in Ashe County, North Carolina.
- Dodson, James. Rebirth of a Mountain Parish: With Some Unorthodox Methods and Some Uncommon Frescoes, Father Faulton Hodge Has Pulled Off a "Small Miracle". [Harrisburg, Pa.]: [Historical Times, Inc.], 1983. Notes: Caption title. Discusses a fresco painted by Ben Long in Saint Mary's Episcopal Church in Ashe County, N.C. Detached from: Blair & Ketchum's country journal. Vol. 10, no. 12 (Dec. 1983).
- Haughey, John C., Loonis McGlohon, Ben Long, and Eileen Farrell. A Fresco for St. Peter's. New York: Sheed and Ward, 1990. Summary: Gifted North Carolina artist Ben Long paints a masterful fresco on the wall of St. Peter's Catholic Church in Charlotte, North Carolina. Aided by his apprentices, he depicts three scenes from the New Testament: the agony in the Garden of Gethsemane, Pentecost, and the Resurrection. The complicated process of fresco painting is described from initial planning to completion of the project.
- Hodge, Fulton, Charles Kuralt, Ben Long, Charles Ernharn, Bill Francis, Bernard Goss, and Doug Schwartz. Charles Kuralt's Story About a New York Bred Episcopalian Priest Who Came to Serve Three Small Conservative Rural Parishes in North Carolina and Changed Moribund Prayer Communities into Proud Blossoming Congregations by Radical Moves Including the Painting of a Fresco of the Last Supper by Artist Ben Long, and by Various Townspeople Who Served As Models for the Apostles. 1984. Summary: A profile of New York City born Episcopalian priest Fulton Hodge, who changed three struggling community churches into proud, blossoming congregations through enlisting people like artist Ben Long to improve the buildings and bringing community members in to model for a fresco of the last supper. On the show "Sunday Morning."
- Holy Trinity Episcopal Church (Glendale Springs, N.C.). Hot Lime: The Great Blue Ridge Fresco Experience. [Boone, NC]: JRM Films, 1982. Event notes: Filmed on location in Glendale Springs, North Carolina. Description: 1 videocassette (57 min., 48 sec.): sound, color; 3/4 in. Summary: A documentary focusing on the painting of the Last Supper Fresco at Holy Trinity Episcopal Church, Glendale Springs, North Carolina. The fresco was done by Ben Long, master fresco painter, and 20 apprentices during the summer of 1980.
- Lester, Michael P. 2009. "Failure of a Church Fresco: The Engineering of Art Vs. the Art of Engineering". Publication: Forensic Engineering 2009 Pathology of the Built Environment; 433-443; Reston, VA; American Society of Civil Engineers; 2009. Abstract: St. Peter's Catholic Church in Charlotte, North Carolina, commissioned artist Ben Long to erect a fresco in the church sanctuary. The fresco was erected on the gabled south wall of the sanctuary. The work of art commenced in 1988 and it was completed in 1989, with assistance of apprentices and consultation of building professionals. In February 2002, the buon fresco partially collapsed from the wall of the sanctuary, which was constructed c. 1893. Coincidentally, the church was surrounded by ongoing construction activity for a large multi-use development, and the collapse reportedly occurred during removal of concrete pavement close to the structure. The church alleged, as did some investigators, that the collapse ensued because of adverse vibrations associated with the construction activity. This paper presents the evaluations of the author, including observations, analysis of vibration activity, and laboratory testing, which revealed the fresco failure commenced prior to surrounding construction because of inherent defects in the fresco installation.
- Long, Ben. Ben Long Fresco, Wilkesboro, NC, St. Paul's Episcopal Church, June 10, 2002. Notes: Title from label pasted on cover of loose-leaf binder. Collection consists of: photographs and photocopies of Ben Long working on the fresco; a vita; and 2 brochures, one relating to the fresco, the other to the Fine Arts League of Asheville.
- Long, Ben. 100 Year Anniversary Liturgy: Saturday, September 25, 1993 [with Musical Setting]. Charlotte, N.C.: St. Peter's Catholic Church, 1993. Notes: Tom Burgess, Chair, The Anniversary Liturgy Committee; Principal Concelebrants, The Reverend James A. Devereux, S.J., Pastor ... ; The Reverend Thomas Clancy, S.J., Homilist. "St. Peter's Church: A Hundred Years: 1893-1993," on p. [10], plus 2 photos on p. [11]. Cover title. Insert on Ben Long's frescos in rear pocket: Scriptures related to fresco scenes.
- Mint Museum of Art; Long, Ben, and Charles L. Mo. The North Carolina Frescoes of Ben Long. Charlotte, North Carolina: Nations Bank, 1997.
- Maschal, Richard. Wet-Wall Tattoos Ben Long and the Art of Fresco. Winston-Salem, NC: John F. Blair, Publisher, 2013.
- McGlohon, Loonis, Jim Tringas, Ben Long, and Bob Lacey. A Fresco for Glendale Spring. 1981. Notes: Reproduced from the archival original, housed in the Peabody Collection of the University of Georgia Libraries, by the Peabody Recording Center, University of Georgia, Athens, Ga., 1981. A program broadcast November 30, 1980 by WBTV, Charlotte, N.C. Accompanying print material is available in the Libraries. An entry in the 1980 Peabody Awards competition for television, no. 80059 PST.
- WBTV (Television station: Charlotte, N.C.). Ben Long. Charlotte, N.C.: WBTV, 1988. Abstract: Local news story about artist Ben Long painting frescoes at St. Peter's church in Charlotte, N.C. Broadcast July 9, 1988.
- Montreat College (1995- ), and A New Light Productions, Inc. Chapel of the Prodigal: The Painting of the Fresco, the Return of the Prodigal. Asheville, NC: New Light Video Productions, 1999. 1 videocassette (57 min.): sound, color with black and white sequences; 1/2 in. Abstract: A documentary focusing on the painting of the Return of the Prodigal fresco in the Chapel of the Prodigal at Montreat College. The fresco was done by Ben Long, master fresco painter, and associate artists. Film includes interviews with the artists and college administrators, scenes from the creation of the fresco, and images of the building process and dedication of the Chapel of the Prodigal.
