= Jonas Ridge, North Carolina =

- Unincorporated community
- Location within North Carolina Location within the United States
- Coordinates: 35°58′21″N 81°53′41″W
- Country: United States
- State: North Carolina
- County: Burke
- Named for: Jonas Braswell
- Elevation: 3,809 ft (1,161 m)
- Time zone: UTC-5 (Eastern (EST))
  - Summer (DST): UTC-4 (EDT)
- ZIP code: 28641
- Area code: 828
- GNIS feature ID: 1020975

Jonas Ridge is an unincorporated community in Burke County, North Carolina, United States. Jonas Ridge is located on North Carolina Highway 181 in northwestern Burke County, 3.9 miles (6.3 km) south-southeast of Crossnore. Jonas Ridge has a post office with ZIP code 28641.

== Notable weather event ==
During the January 2016 United States blizzard, on January 22, 2016, NBC News reported that as of 5 p.m. (relatively early in the storm), Jonas Ridge had received the greatest amount of snowfall: 18 inches.

== Etymology ==
Traditionally, the name Jonas Ridge has been attributed to Revolutionary War veteran William Barjonah (Jonas) Braswell. Braswell died during a sudden winter storm in 1825. However, an 1809 North Carolina land grant (Book 124, page 408) refers to property on "Jonas Ridge," and a land transaction in the late 1700s refers to Jonas Mountain in the same area. This would indicate that Jonas Ridge was more likely named for John Jonas, who received a land grant nearby in 1780.
