= Lake James State Park =

State park in Burke and McDowell Counties, North Carolina

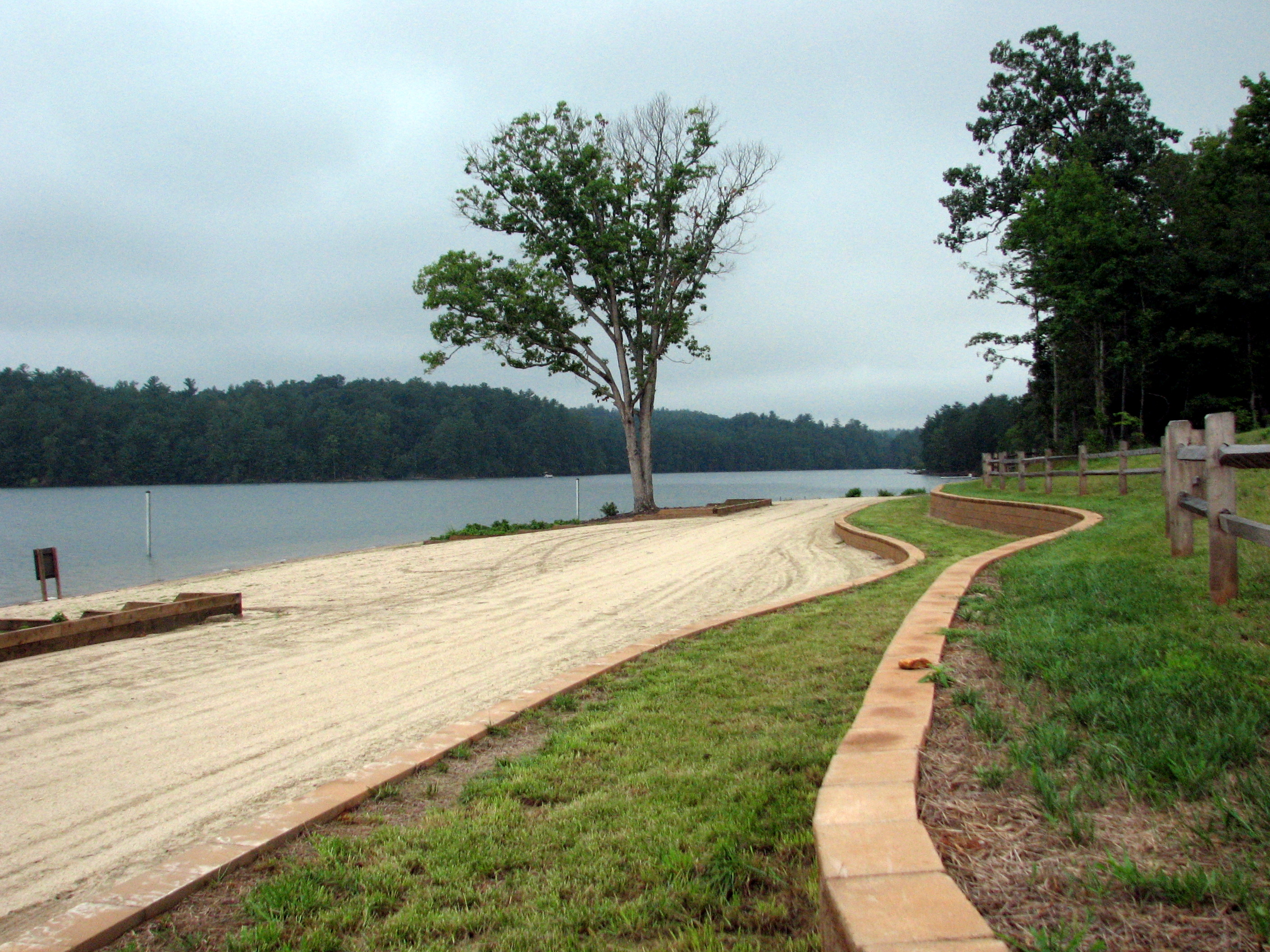
- Paddy's Creek swimming beach

- Location within North Carolina Location within the United States
- Interactive map of Lake James State Park
- Location: Burke and McDowell counties, North Carolina, United States
- Coordinates: 35°43′43″N 81°54′04″W
- Area: 3,743 acres (1,515 ha)
- Elevation: 1,200 ft (370 m)
- Established: 1987
- Administrator: North Carolina Division of Parks and Recreation
- Website: Official website

Park entrance sign

Lake James State Park is a North Carolina state park in Burke and McDowell counties, North Carolina in the United States. Located near Nebo, North Carolina, it covers 3,743 acres (15.15 km^{2}) and borders 6,510-acre (26 km^{2}) Lake James.

== History ==
Started in 1987, Lake James State Park had 471,566 visitors in 2014. The park added 2,915 acres (1,180 ha) purchased from Crescent Resources, which once managed Duke Energy real estate, in the Long Arm Peninsula and Paddy's Creek areas in 2005. On January 11, 2016, Governor Pat McCrory announced the addition of 129 acres (52 ha) with 8,900 feet (2,700 m) of shoreline. The land was purchased for $1.74 million through the N.C. Parks and Recreation Trust Fund and the federal Land and Water Conservation Fund. Crescent Communities (formerly Crescent Resources) had kept the land in 2005 but sold it after The Foothills Conservancy of North Carolina arranged the deal.

The further conservation, preservation, and protection of the park is formally supported by the Friends of Lake James State Park.

== See also ==
- Fonta Flora State Trail
- Overmountain Victory National Historic Trail
