= Windsor, South Carolina =

Windsor
- Town
- Location within South Carolina Location within the United States
- Coordinates: 33°28′51″N 81°30′49″W
- Country: United States
- State: South Carolina
- County: Aiken
- Named for: Anderson Windsor

Area
  - Total: 0.87 sq mi (2.26 km^{2})
  - Land: 0.87 sq mi (2.26 km^{2})
  - Water: 0 sq mi (0.00 km^{2})
- Elevation: 390 ft (120 m)

Population (2020)
  - Total: 115
  - Density: 131.5/sq mi (50.78/km^{2})
- Time zone: UTC-5 (Eastern (EST))
  - Summer (DST): UTC-4 (EDT)
- ZIP code: 29856
- Area codes: 803, 839
- FIPS code: 45-78190
- GNIS feature ID: 2406898
- Website: www.facebook.com/windsor.southcarolina/

Windsor is a town in Aiken County, South Carolina, United States. As of the 2020 census, Windsor had a population of 115. It is part of the Augusta, Georgia metropolitan area.

== History ==
The name of the town of Windsor likely originated from the 1813 will of Anderson Windsor, who owned land on Pond Branch and Yarrow Branch, near the present location of Windsor.

== Geography ==
Windsor is located in eastern Aiken County.

According to the United States Census Bureau, the town has a total area of 0.66 square miles (1.7 km^{2}), all land.

== Demographics ==
Historical population
| Census | Pop. | Note | %± |
|---|---|---|---|
| 1890 | 51 | | — |
| 1910 | 73 | | — |
| 1980 | 55 | | — |
| 1990 | 124 | | 125.5% |
| 2000 | 127 | | 2.4% |
| 2010 | 121 | | −4.7% |
| 2020 | 115 | | −5.0% |
U.S. Decennial Census

As of the census of 2000, there were 127 people, 52 households, and 34 families residing in the town. The population density was 126.7 inhabitants per square mile (48.9/km^{2}). There were 63 housing units at an average density of 62.8 per square mile (24.2/km^{2}). The racial makeup of the town was 69.29% White, 27.56% African American, 2.36% Native American, 0.79% from other races. Hispanic or Latino of any race were 2.36% of the population.

There were 52 households, out of which 36.5% had children under the age of 18 living with them, 55.8% were married couples living together, 9.6% had a female householder with no husband present, and 34.6% were non-families. 28.8% of all households were made up of individuals, and 11.5% had someone living alone who was 65 years of age or older. The average household size was 2.44 and the average family size was 3.09.

In the town, the population was spread out, with 28.3% under the age of 18, 3.1% from 18 to 24, 37.8% from 25 to 44, 22.0% from 45 to 64, and 8.7% who were 65 years of age or older. The median age was 35 years. For every 100 females, there were 95.4 males. For every 100 females age 18 and over, there were 89.6 males.

The median income for a household in the town was $35,833, and the median income for a family was $42,083. Males had a median income of $35,833 versus $23,750 for females. The per capita income for the town was $14,828. There were 9.8% of families and 14.3% of the population living below the poverty line, including 20.5% of under eighteens and none of those over 64.

=== 2010 Demographics ===
The following is from the 2010 Census: Total Population 121 (100.00%)

Population by Race Asian alone 1 (0.83%) Black or African American alone 10 (8.26%) Some other race alone 5 (4.13%) Two or more races 5 (4.13%) White alone 100 (82.64%)

Population by Hispanic or Latino Origin (of any race) Persons Not of Hispanic or Latino Origin 104 (85.95%) Persons of Hispanic or Latino Origin 17 (14.05%)

Population by Gender Female 64 (52.89%) Male 57 (47.11%)

Population by Age Persons 0 to 4 years 12 (9.92%) Persons 5 to 17 years 27 (22.31%) Persons 18 to 64 years 63 (52.07%) Persons 65 years and over 19 (15.70%)

== Education ==
It is in the Aiken County Public School District.

Zoned schools are Oakwood-Windsor Elementary School, Aiken Middle School for 6th grade, Kennedy Middle School for grades 7-8, and South Aiken High School.

== Notable people ==
- L. L. Keenan (1894–1949) – member of the South Carolina House of Representatives
