= Crescent Communities =

Real estate company from Charlotte, NC

- Formerly: South Carolina Land and Timber (1963); Crescent Land and Timber (1969); Crescent Resources (mid-80s)
- Type: Private Corporation
- Industry: Mixed-Use Real Estate - both Multifamily and Commercial
- Headquarters: Charlotte, North Carolina, U.S.
- Key people: Brian Natwick (Chairman & CEO); Kevin H. Lambert (CFO)
- Total assets: US$1 billion+ (2017)
- Number of employees: 115
- Website: http://www.crescentcommunities.com/

Crescent Communities is a real estate investor, developer, and operator of mixed-use communities with headquarters in Charlotte, North Carolina. It has approximately 115 employees. The company has offices in Charlotte, Washington, D.C., Atlanta, Orlando, Nashville, Dallas, Denver, Phoenix, and Salt Lake City.

== History ==
In 1939, Duke Power (now Duke Energy) established a forestry department to manage company land not used for power generation. In 1963, this department became the company South Carolina Land and Timber. As the holdings expanded to include land in North Carolina, the organization was renamed Crescent Land and Timber in 1969. Some of the original land was sold to Crescent Land and Timber by the Singer Corporation.

In the mid-1980s, the company was renamed Crescent Resources as it began to actively develop residential communities. Crescent Resources began work on its first commercial development, Coliseum Centre, in 1990. As of 1991, Crescent Resources managed 270,000 acres of land. Holdings included part of what became Lake James State Park, which it later sold to the state of North Carolina. Crescent Resources became a separate entity from Duke Energy in 2006, with Duke Energy selling its 49% stake to Morgan Stanley.

Crescent Resources filed for bankruptcy in 2009, and has emerged from it separated from the utility company. The company aimed to rebrand itself, renaming itself "Crescent Communities" in 2013.
