= Lake James =

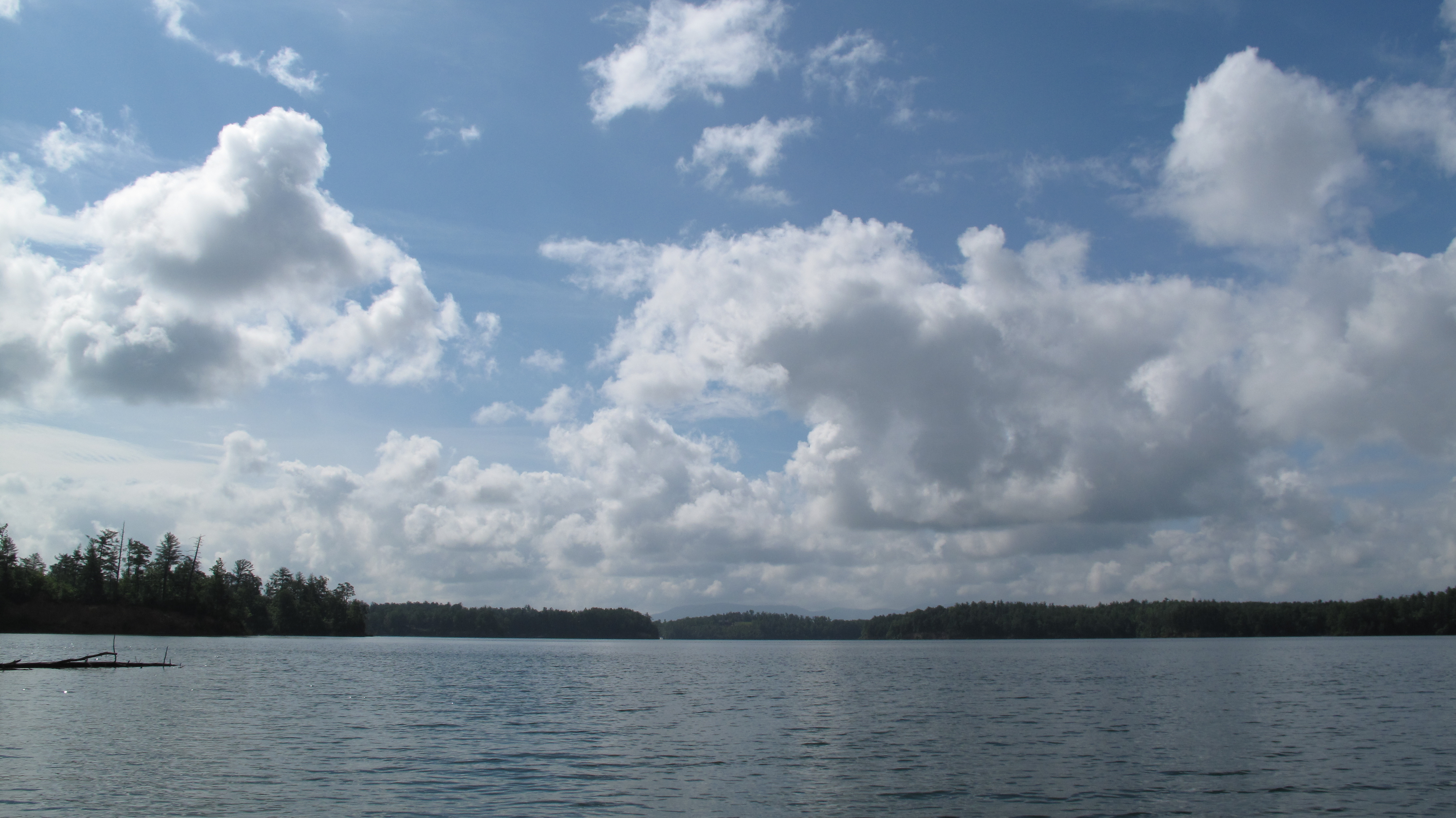
- Lake James in May 2010

- Location within North Carolina Location within the United States
- Location: Burke / McDowell counties, North Carolina, United States
- Coordinates: 35°44′36″N 81°53′04″W
- Type: reservoir
- Catchment area: 387 square miles (1,000 km^{2})
- Managing agency: Duke Energy
- Built: August 1916
- First flooded: May 1919
- Surface area: 6,812 acres (2,757 ha)
- Surface elevation: 1,200 feet (370 m)

Lake James is a large reservoir in the mountains of Western North Carolina which straddles the border between Burke and McDowell Counties. It is named for tobacco tycoon and benefactor of Duke University James Buchanan Duke. The lake, with surface elevation of 1200 ft (366 m), lies behind a series of 3 earthen dams. It was created by Duke Power between 1916 and 1923 as a hydro-electric project. It still generates power today and is the uppermost lake on the Catawba River system.

== History ==
Lake James is the product of an effort in the early 1900s led by James B. Duke to create a system of dams and reservoirs on the Catawba River in North Carolina's Piedmont with the intention of electrifying the region. The reservoir was sited at the confluence of the Catawba River, which has its headwaters in the mountains near the unincorporated community of Linville Falls (North Fork) and on the eastern slope of the Eastern Continental Divide, and the Linville River, which gets its start on the slopes of Grandfather Mountain and carves the Linville Gorge after tumbling over Linville Falls north of the lake. The reservoir is also fed by several smaller flows, including Paddy's Creek (sometimes Paddy Creek), which lends it name to a campground, boat launch, and a portion of Lake James State Park that is home to a sandy beach swimming area.

Work on the earthen works that created the reservoir began in 1916 and completion of the impoundment came in 1923. The flooding of the lake claimed a portion of the small farming community of Fonta Flora, which was spread between the fertile river valley and the surrounding low hills.

In the century since the creation of the lake, local residents created a mythology about Fonta Flora that includes claims it is possible to dive to buildings still standing under the waters of the lake and even that portions of those structures are visible when the lake's water level is low. However, there is little evidence any significant structures remained in the portion of the valley that was flooded.

Today, the Fonta Flora name is memorialized or perpetuated in several ways in the area, including in branding of an eponymous brewery located in nearby Morganton and with the Fonta Flora State Trail, which follows the shore of Lake James in the area where the community once stood. The hiking and biking trail, which is still under construction, is intended to eventually connect Morganton to Asheville.

== Development ==
Lake James contains 10.2 square miles (26 km^{2}) of surface area and more than 150 miles (240 km) of shoreline. Housing development on the lake has been considerable since the 1980s, and is concentrated on its southern and eastern shores. Most of the non-developed area around Lake James is owned by Crescent Communities, a real estate developer founded in the 1960s and formerly a subsidiary of Duke Energy.

In 1999, several bald eagles were found nesting in trees on the northeastern shore of Lake James, stopping housing development in their vicinity. A small species of invasive jellyfish also lives in its waters.

1780 and Old Wildlife Club can only have 1 home per 5 acres (20,000 m^{2}). Roughly 72 miles (116 km) of the 150 miles (240 km) of shoreline will never be developed. These developments include Black Forest, Dry Creek, 1780 and Old Wildlife Club. Black Forest is 600 acres (2.4 km^{2}) and could have included 1200 homesites, but has only 54. Dry Creek is around 400 acres (1.6 km^{2}) and was supposed to have 600 homesites, but has only 64.

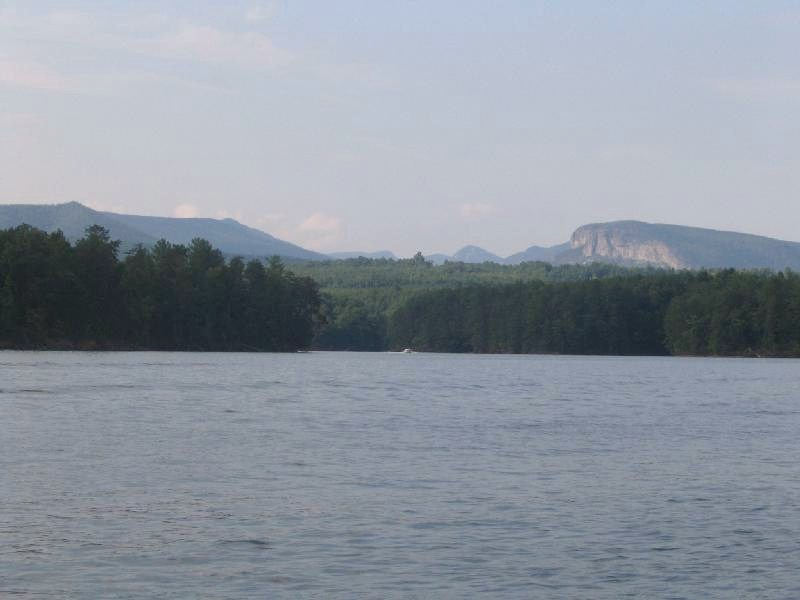
View of Shortoff Mountain from Lake James

== Attractions ==
Lake James State Park is located on the lake's southern shore. It is the first of North Carolina's state parks to which funds were appropriated for land acquisition and park development from the outset. Crescent Resources (now Crescent Communities) worked with the State of North Carolina and Foothills Conservancy of NC in 2004 to expand the state park, adding 3,000 acres (12 km^{2}) to the park's original 605 acres (2.45 km^{2}). This now represents North Carolina's largest waterfront state park.

Meetings of many of the Lake James area's housing associations are held at nearby Saint Paul's Episcopal Church.

In 1992 Lake James was a filming site for the Daniel Day-Lewis movie The Last of the Mohicans, where it doubled as Lake George, New York and a replica of Fort William Henry was constructed. A backdrop of Lake James was used for the final scenes of the movie The Hunt for Red October.

In the fall of 2006, the first of 3.5 miles (5.6 km) of new pathways on the Overmountain Victory National Historic Trail (OVNHT) was certified by the National Park Service. The trail, which received its historic designation from President Jimmy Carter in 1980, commemorates the march of the "Overmountain Men," a patriot militia who defeated the British at the Battle of Kings Mountain during the Revolutionary War. The new section of the trail runs through the 1780 community, which is named after the year the militia marched through the Lake James area. Plans have been discussed to connect the OVNHT to the Mountains-to-Sea Trail.

Lake James allows jet skis, and encourages fishing and camping in designated areas.
