= List of county courthouses in North Carolina =

This is a list of county courthouses in North Carolina. Each county in North Carolina has a city that is the county seat where the county government resides, including typically the county courthouse. This includes current and former notable courthouses. Some courthouses are listed on the National Register of Historic Places.

Picture	Courthouse	County	Location (Main Branch, if multiple locations)	Built	Notes
	Alamance County Courthouse	Alamance County	212 W Elm St; Graham, NC 27253-2882	1923	
	Alexander County Courthouse	Alexander County	29 W. Main Ave; Taylorsville, NC 28681		
	Alleghany County Courthouse	Alleghany County	12 N Main St; Sparta, NC 28675	1933	
	Anson County Courthouse	Anson County	114 N Greene St; Wadesboro, NC 28170		Included in Wadesboro Downtown Historic District
	Ashe County Courthouse	Ashe County	150 Government Circle; Jefferson, NC 28640	1904	
	Avery County Courthouse	Avery County	200 Montezuma St; Newland, NC 28657	1912	
	Beaufort County Courthouse	Beaufort County	112 W Second St; Washington, NC 27889-1403	1786	
	Bertie County Courthouse	Bertie County	108 Dundee St; Windsor, NC 27983	1889	
	Bladen County Courthouse	Bladen County	106 W. Broad Street; Elizabethtown, NC 28337		
	Brunswick County Courthouse	Brunswick County	310 Government Center Dr NE; Bolivia, NC 28422	1844	
	Buncombe County Courthouse	Buncombe County	60 Court Plaza; Asheville, NC 28801	1924-1928	
	Burke County Courthouse	Burke County	201 South Green St; Morganton, NC 28655	1837	
	Cabarrus County Courthouse	Cabarrus County	77 Union St South; Concord, NC 28025	1876	
	Caldwell County Courthouse	Caldwell County	216 Main St NW; Lenoir, NC 28645	1905	
	Camden County Courthouse	Camden County	117 North Hwy 343; Camden, NC 27921	1847	
	Carteret County Courthouse	Carteret County	300 Courthouse Square; Beaufort, NC 28516		
	Caswell County Courthouse	Caswell County	139 East Church St; Yanceyville, NC 27379	1858-1861	
	Catawba County Courthouse	Catawba County	100 SW Blvd, Hwy 321 S Newton, NC 28658	1924	
	Chatham County Courthouse	Chatham County	158 West Street; Pittsboro, NC 27312	1881	
	Cherokee County Courthouse	Cherokee County	75 Peachtree St; Murphy, NC 28906	1926	One of only a few county courthouses built out of marble
	Chowan County Courthouse	Chowan County	101 S Broad St; Edenton, NC 27932	1767	
	Clay County Government Center	Clay County	261 Courthouse Dr Suite 1 Hayesville, NC 28904	2007	
	Historic Clay County Courthouse	Clay County	25 Herbert St; Hayesville, NC 28904	1888	Today serves as an event venue
	Cleveland County Courthouse	Cleveland County	100 Justice Place; Shelby, NC 28150	1907	
	Columbus County Courthouse	Columbus County	100 Courthouse Circle; Whiteville, NC 28472	1914-1915	
	Craven County Courthouse	Craven County	302 Broad St; New Bern, NC 28563		
	Cumberland County Courthouse	Cumberland County	117 Dick St; Fayetteville, NC 28301	1925-1926	
	Currituck County Courthouse	Currituck County	2795 Caratoke Hwy; Currituck, NC 27929	1842	
	Dare County Courthouse	Dare County	962 Marshall Collins Dr; Manteo, NC 27954		
	Davidson County Courthouse	Davidson County	110 West Center St; Lexington, NC 27292	1858	
	Davie County Courthouse	Davie County	140 South Main St; Mocksville, NC 27028	1909	
	Duplin County Courthouse	Duplin County	112 Duplin St; Kenansville, NC 28349		
	Durham County Courthouse	Durham County	201 East Main St; Durham, NC 2770	2013	
	Edgecombe County Courthouse	Edgecombe County	301 St Andrews St; Tarboro, NC 27886		
	Forsyth County Courthouse	Forsyth County	200 N Main St; Winston-Salem, NC 27101	1926	
	Franklin County Courthouse	Franklin County	102 S Main St; Louisburg, NC 27549		
	Gaston County Courthouse	Gaston County	325 North Marietta St; Gastonia, NC 28052-2331	1910	
	Gates County Courthouse	Gates County	202 Court St; Gatesville, NC 27938	1836	
	Graham County Courthouse	Graham County	12 Court St; Robbinsville, NC 28771	1942	
	Granville County Courthouse	Granville County	101 Main St; Oxford, NC 27565	1838	
	Greene County Courthouse	Greene County	301 N Greene St; Snow Hill, NC 28580	1935	
	Guilford County Courthouse	Guilford County	201 South Eugene St; Greensboro, NC 27401	1918-1920	
	Halifax County Courthouse	Halifax County	357 Ferrell Lane; Halifax, NC 27839	1909-1910	
	Harnett County Courthouse	Harnett County	301 W. Cornelius Harnett Blvd, Suite 100; Lillington, NC 27546		
	Haywood County Courthouse	Haywood County	285 N Main St, Suite 1500; Waynesville, NC 28786	1932	
	Henderson County Courthouse	Henderson County	200 N Grove St, Suite 163; Hendersonville, NC 28793	1905	
	Hertford County Courthouse	Hertford County	701 King St; Winton, NC 27986		
	Hoke County Courthouse	Hoke County	304 N Main St; Raeford, NC 28376	1912	
	Hyde County Courthouse	Hyde County	40 Oyster Creek Rd; Swan Quarter, NC 27885	1855	
	Iredell County Courthouse	Iredell County	221 East Water St; Statesville, NC 28677	1899	
	Jackson County Courthouse	Jackson County	401 Grindstaff Cove Rd; Sylva, NC 28779	1913	
	Johnston County Courthouse	Johnston County	207 E Johnston St; Smithfield, NC 27577	1921	
	Jones County Courthouse	Jones County	101 Market St; Trenton, NC 28585		
	Lee County Courthouse	Lee County	1400 S Horner Blvd; Sanford, NC 27330	1908	
	Lenoir County Courthouse	Lenoir County	130 S Queen St; Kinston, NC 28501	1939	
	Lincoln County Courthouse	Lincoln County	1 Courthouse Square; Lincolnton, NC 28093	1921	
	Macon County Courthouse	Macon County	5 W Main St; Franklin, NC 28734	1972	
	Madison County Courthouse	Madison County	2 N Main St; Marshall, NC 28753	1907	
	Martin County Courthouse	Martin County	305 E Main St; Williamston, NC 27892	1885	
	McDowell County Courthouse	McDowell County	21 S Main St; Marion, NC 28752	1923	
	Mecklenburg County Courthouse	Mecklenburg County	832 East Fourth St; Charlotte, NC 28202	1928	
	Mitchell County Courthouse	Mitchell County	328 Longview Dr; Bakersville, NC 28705	1908	
	Montgomery County Courthouse	Montgomery County	108 E Main St; Troy, NC 27371	1921	
	Moore County Courthouse	Moore County	102 Monroe St; Carthage, NC 28327	1923	
	Nash County Courthouse	Nash County	234 W Washington St; Nashville, NC 27856	1921	
	New Hanover County Courthouse	New Hanover County	316 Princess St; Wilmington, NC 28401	1892	
	Northampton County Courthouse	Northampton County	104 West Jefferson St; Jackson, NC 27845	1858	
	Onslow County Courthouse	Onslow County	625 Court St; Jacksonville, NC 28540		
	Old Orange County Courthouse	Orange County	106 E Margaret Lane; Hillsborough, NC 27278	1845	
	Dickerson Chapel	Orange County	100 E Queen St, Hillsborough, NC 27278	1790	Served as courthouse from 1790 to 1844.
	Pamlico County Courthouse	Pamlico County	202 Main St; Bayboro, NC 28515		
	Pasquotank County Courthouse	Pasquotank County	206 E Main St; Elizabeth City, NC 27909		
	Pender County Courthouse	Pender County	100 Wright St; Burgaw, NC 28425	1936	
	Perquimans County Courthouse	Perquimans County	128 N Church St; Hertford, NC 27944	1825	
	Person County Courthouse	Person County	105 S Main St; Roxboro, NC 27573	1930	
	Pitt County Courthouse	Pitt County	100 W Third St; Greenville, NC 27835	1910	
	Polk County Courthouse	Polk County	One Courthouse Square; Columbus, NC 28722	1859	
	Randolph County Courthouse	Randolph County	176 East Salisbury St; Asheboro, NC 27203	1909	
	Richmond County Courthouse	Richmond County	105 W Franklin St; Rockingham, NC 28379	1923	
	Robeson County Courthouse	Robeson County	500 North Elm St, Rm 101; Lumberton, NC 28359-1084		
	Rockingham County Courthouse	Rockingham County	170 Hwy 65; Reidsville, NC 27320	1907	
	Rowan County Courthouse	Rowan County	210 N Main St; Salisbury, NC 28144-4374		
	Rutherford County Courthouse	Rutherford County	229 N Main St; Rutherfordton, NC 28139	1925–1926	
	Sampson County Courthouse	Sampson County	201 E. Main St; Clinton, NC 28328		
	Scotland County Courthouse	Scotland County	212 Biggs St; Laurinburg, NC 28352		
	Stanly County Courthouse	Stanly County	201 S Second St; Albemarle, NC 28002		
	Stokes County Courthouse	Stokes County	Hwy 89 - 1012 Main St; Danbury, NC 27016	1904	
	Surry County Courthouse	Surry County	201 E. Kapp Street; Dobson, NC 27017	1916	
	Swain County Courthouse	Swain County	101 Mitchell St; Bryson City, NC 28713	1908	
	Transylvania County Courthouse	Transylvania County	12 East Main St; Brevard, NC 28712	1873	
	Tyrrell County Courthouse	Tyrrell County	403 Main St; Columbia, NC 27925	1903	
	Union County Courthouse	Union County	400 N Main St; Monroe, NC 28112	1886	
	Vance County Courthouse	Vance County	156 Church St, Suite 101; Henderson, NC 27536	1884	
	Wake County Courthouse	Wake County	316 Fayetteville St Mall; Raleigh, NC 27601		
	Warren County Courthouse	Warren County	109 S Main St; Warrenton, NC 27589		
	Washington County Courthouse	Washington County	120 Adams St; Plymouth, NC 27962	1919	
	Watauga County Courthouse	Watauga County	842 W King St, Suite 13; Boone, NC 28607-3525		
	Wayne County Courthouse	Wayne County	224 Walnut St, Room 230; Goldsboro, NC 27530		
	Wilkes County Courthouse	Wilkes County	500 Courthouse Dr; Wilkesboro, NC 28697-2497	1903	
	Wilson County Courthouse	Wilson County	115 E Nash St; Wilson, NC 27894	1924–1925	
	Yadkin County Courthouse	Yadkin County	101 S State St; Yadkinville, NC 27055		
	Yancey County Courthouse	Yancey County	110 Towne Square, Room 5 Burnsville, NC 28714	1908	
