= Wheeler & Runge =

American architectural partnership

Wheeler & Runge was an American architectural partnership based in Charlotte, North Carolina. The series of partnerships formed by Oliver Duke Wheeler also included Wheeler, Runge & Dickey. and Wheeler & Stern.

Principals included Wheeler, Neil Runge, and D. Anderson Dickey. The firms formed by Wheeler have been collectively called "one of the most prolific firms in the courthouse business."

Earlier in his career, Wheeler was a partner in Hayden, Wheeler, and Schwend with Luke Hayden (architect) and Louis E. Schwend.

== Work ==
- Ashe County Courthouse, Main St. Jefferson, NC (Wheeler & Runge), NRHP-listed
- Avery County Courthouse, Montezuma St. and Courthouse Dr. Newland, NC (Wheeler & Runge), NRHP-listed
- Avery County Jail, 1829 Schultz Cir. Newland, NC (Wheeler & Runge), NRHP-listed
- Caldwell County Courthouse, Main St. Lenoir, NC (Wheeler & Runge), NRHP-listed
- Randolph County Courthouse, Worth St. Asheboro, NC (Wheeler, Runge & Dickey), NRHP-listed
- Stokes County Courthouse, Main St. between North St. and Courthouse Rd. Danbury, NC (Wheeler & Runge), NRHP-listed
- Wilkes County Courthouse, E. Main St. between Bridge and Broad Sts. Wilkesboro, NC (Wheeler & Runge), NRHP-listed The building is a 1902 Beaux-Arts/Classical Revival style building. The building with its "tetrastyle Ionic portico and Second Empire cupola dominates the Courthouse Square and its surroundings and serves as a major landmark in the town as well as in Wilkes County." It is a contributing building in the Downtown Wilkesboro Historic District.
- Watauga County Court House, West King Street, Boone, NC. Built in 1904 using the same basic plan and design as Avery, Ashe, and Wilkes. Building was demolished in 1967.

Other works involving Oliver Wheeler include:

- Central School, 303 McRae St. Laurinburg, NC (Wheeler, Oliver Duke), NRHP-listed
- Grace A.M.E. Zion Church, 219-223 S. Brevard St. Charlotte, NC (Hayden, Wheeler and Schwend), NRHP-listed
- Halifax County Courthouse, Main St. Halifax, NC (Wheeler & Stern), NRHP-listed
- Iredell County Courthouse, S. Center St. between W. Prospect St. and Court Pl. Statesville, NC (Hayden, Wheeler & Schwend), NRHP-listed
- Monroe Residential Historic District, Roughly bounded by Hough, Franklin, Jefferson, McCarten, Windsor, Sanford, Washington. Braden, Church & Hudson Sts. Monroe, NC (Wheeler & Stern), NRHP-listed
- One or more works in Oakwood Historic District, roughly bounded by Oakwood Cemetery and Fourth Ave. NW, Fourth St. NW, Second Ave. NW, and Sixth St. NW Hickory, NC (Wheeler & Stearn), NRHP-listed
- Wadesboro Downtown Historic District, Roughly bounded by Martin, Rutherford, Morgan, Lee, and Brent Sts. Wadesboro, NC (Wheeler & Stern), NRHP-listed

== See also ==
- Academy of Music, Broad and Locust Sts. Philadelphia, PA Lebrun & Runge, designed by Napoleon LeBrun & Gustavus Runge.
