= Harry Barton (architect) =

American architect

- Born: June 17, 1876; Philadelphia, Pennsylvania, United States
- Died: May 9, 1937 (aged 60); Greensboro, North Carolina, United States
- Occupation: Architect

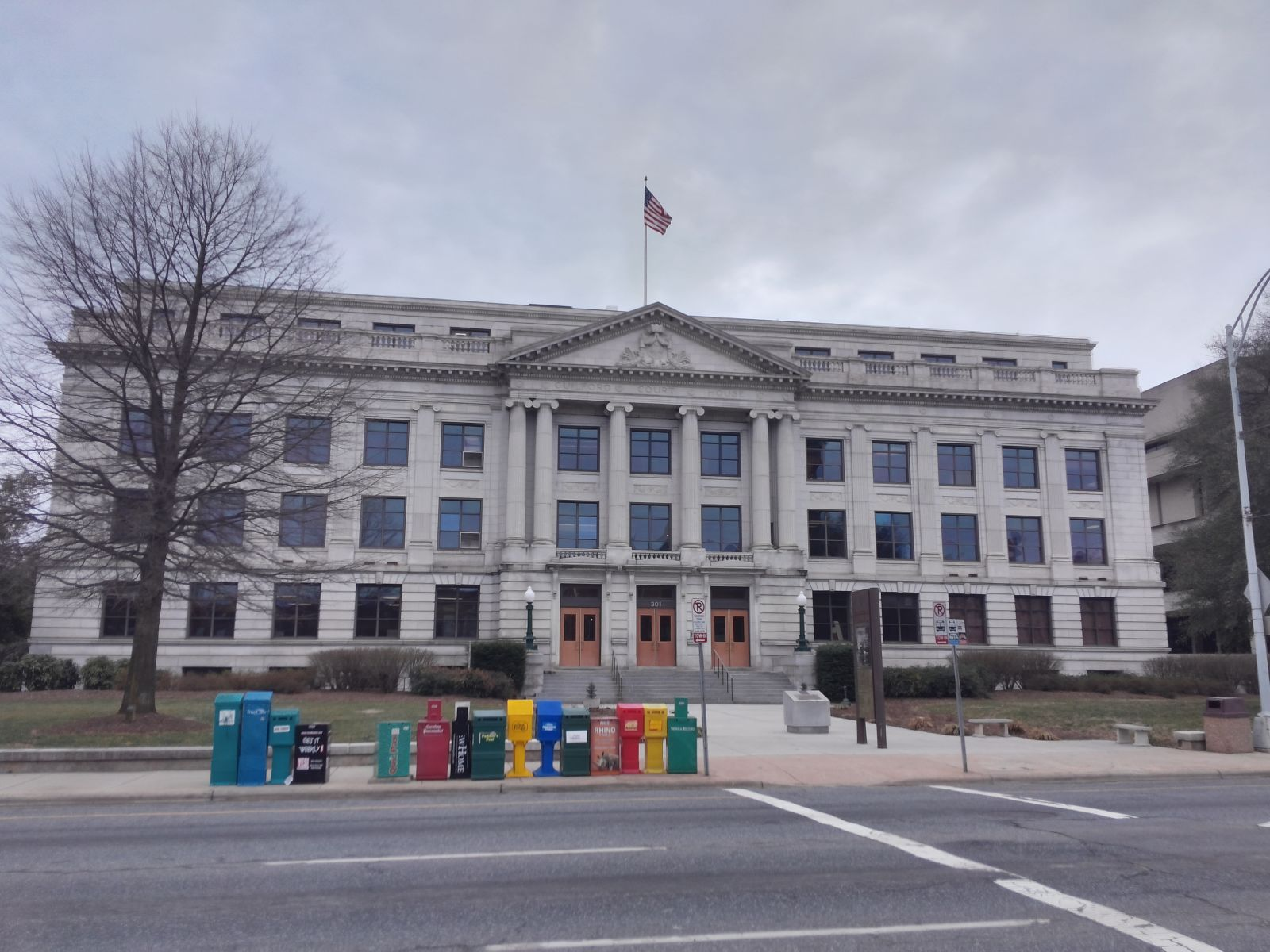
The Guilford County Courthouse (1920) in Greensboro, designed in the Neoclassical style

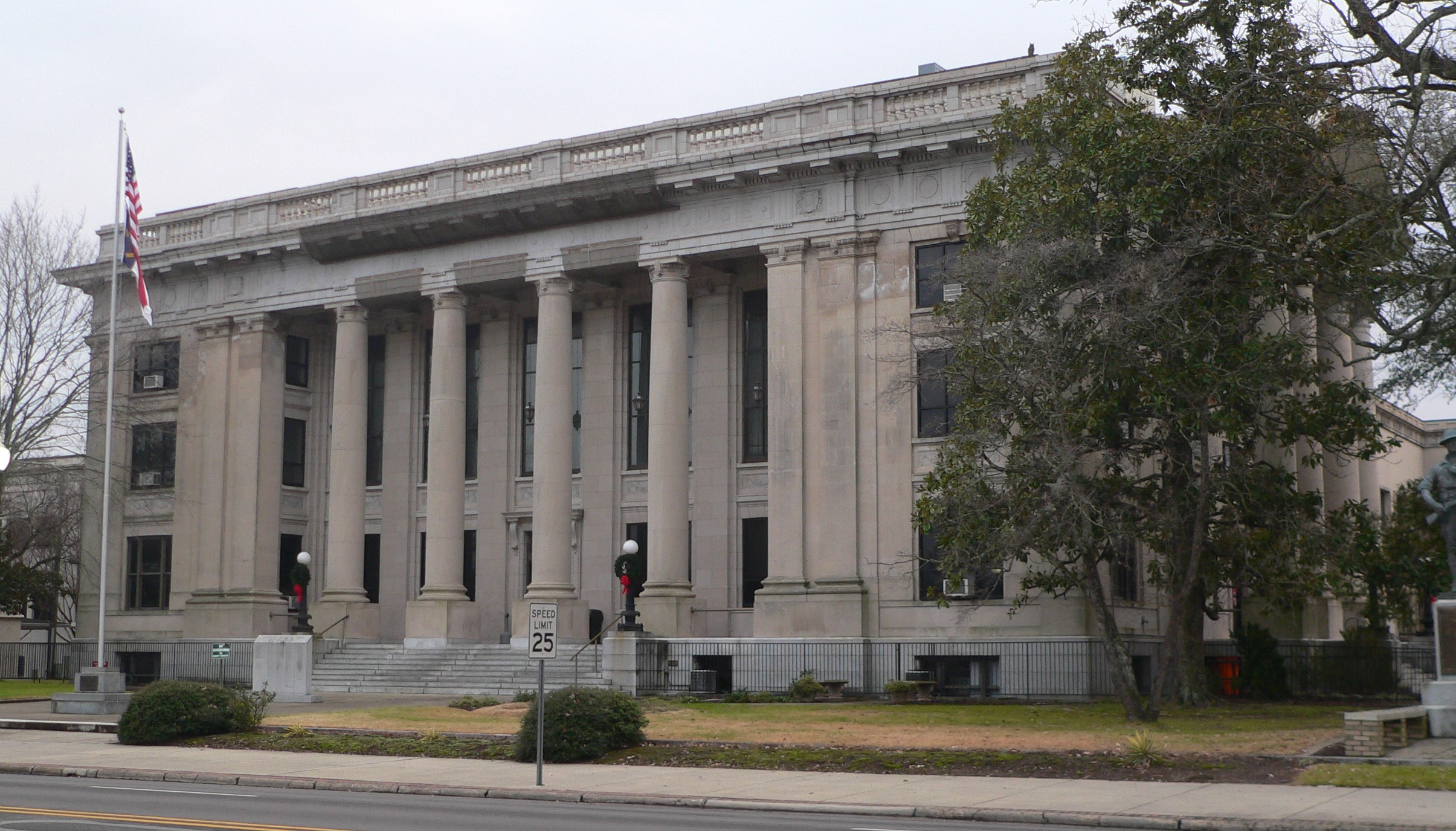
The Johnston County Courthouse (1921) in Smithfield, designed in the Neoclassical style

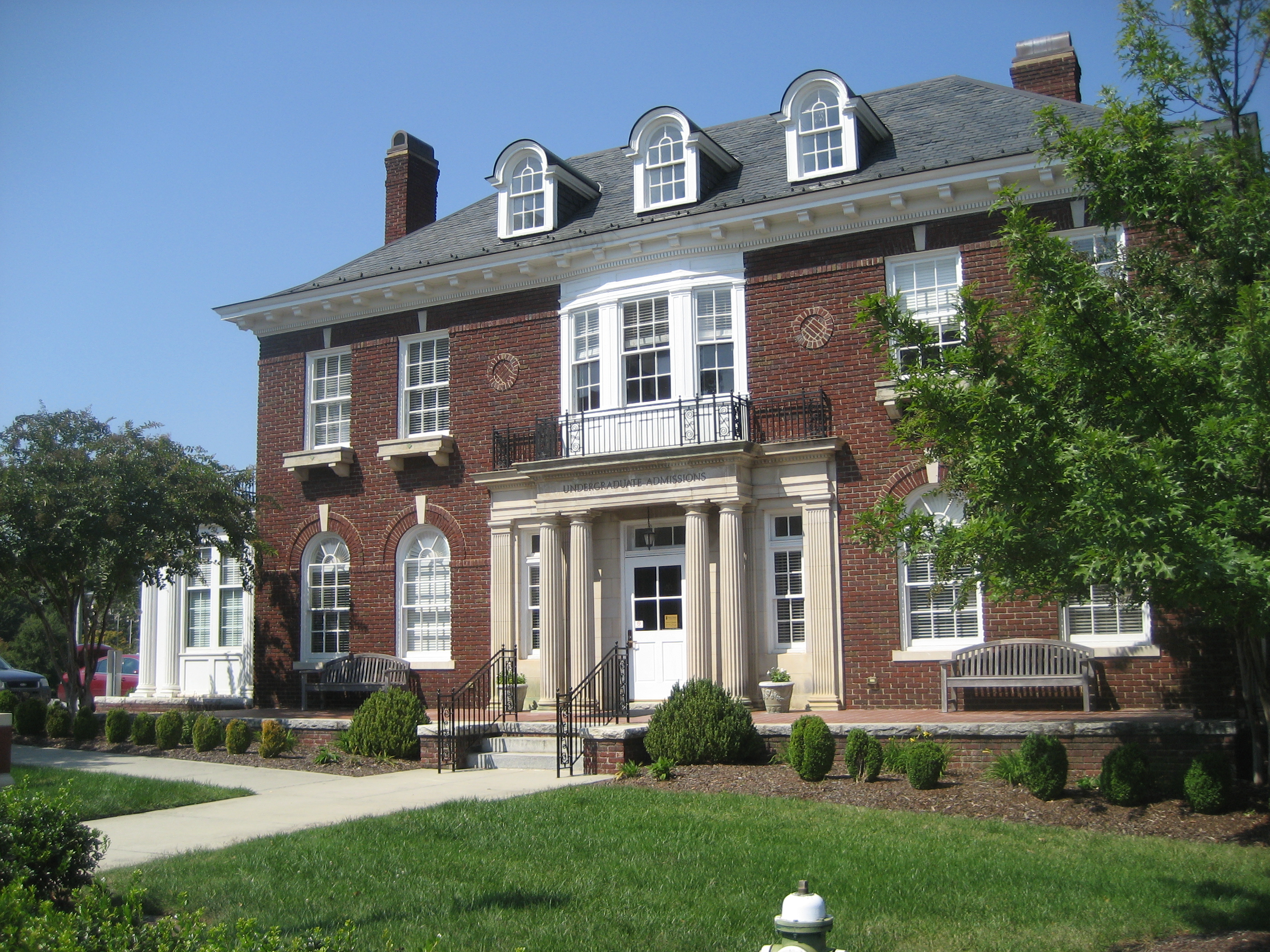
The former Chancellor's House (1923) of the University of North Carolina at Greensboro, designed in the Colonial Revival style

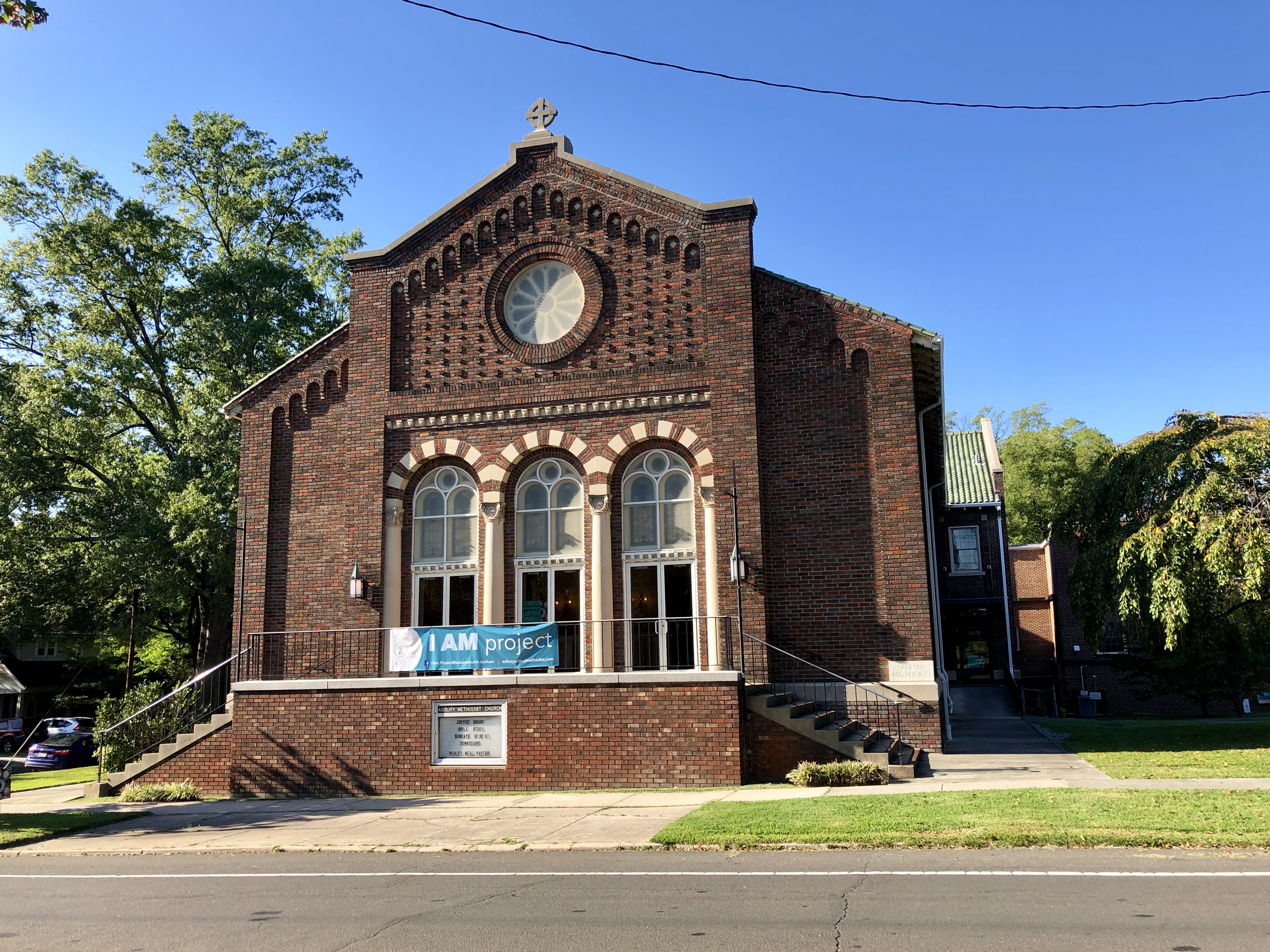
The Asbury United Methodist Church (1926) in Durham, designed in the Byzantine Revival style

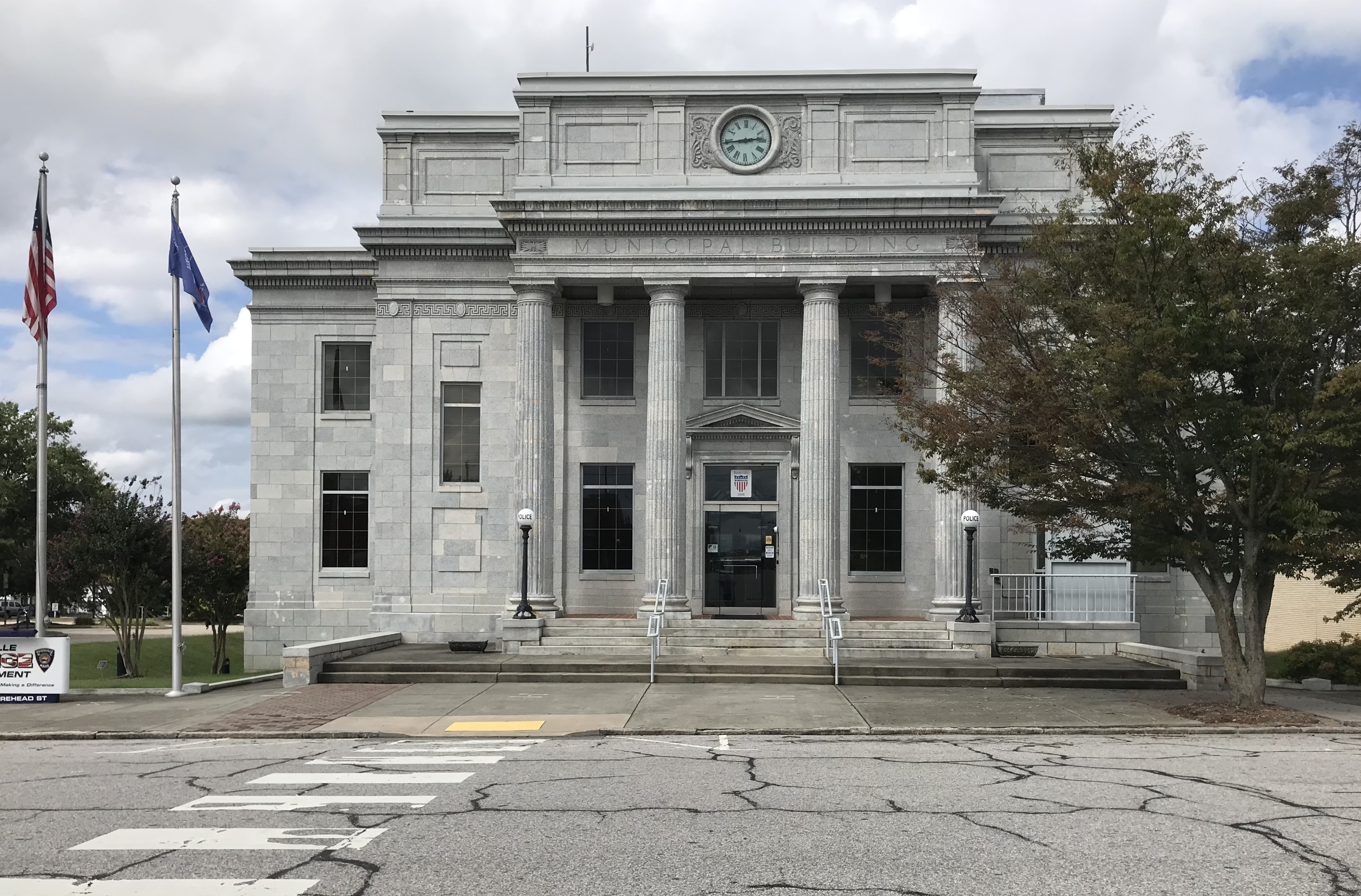
The former Municipal Building (1926) in Reidsville, designed in the Neoclassical style

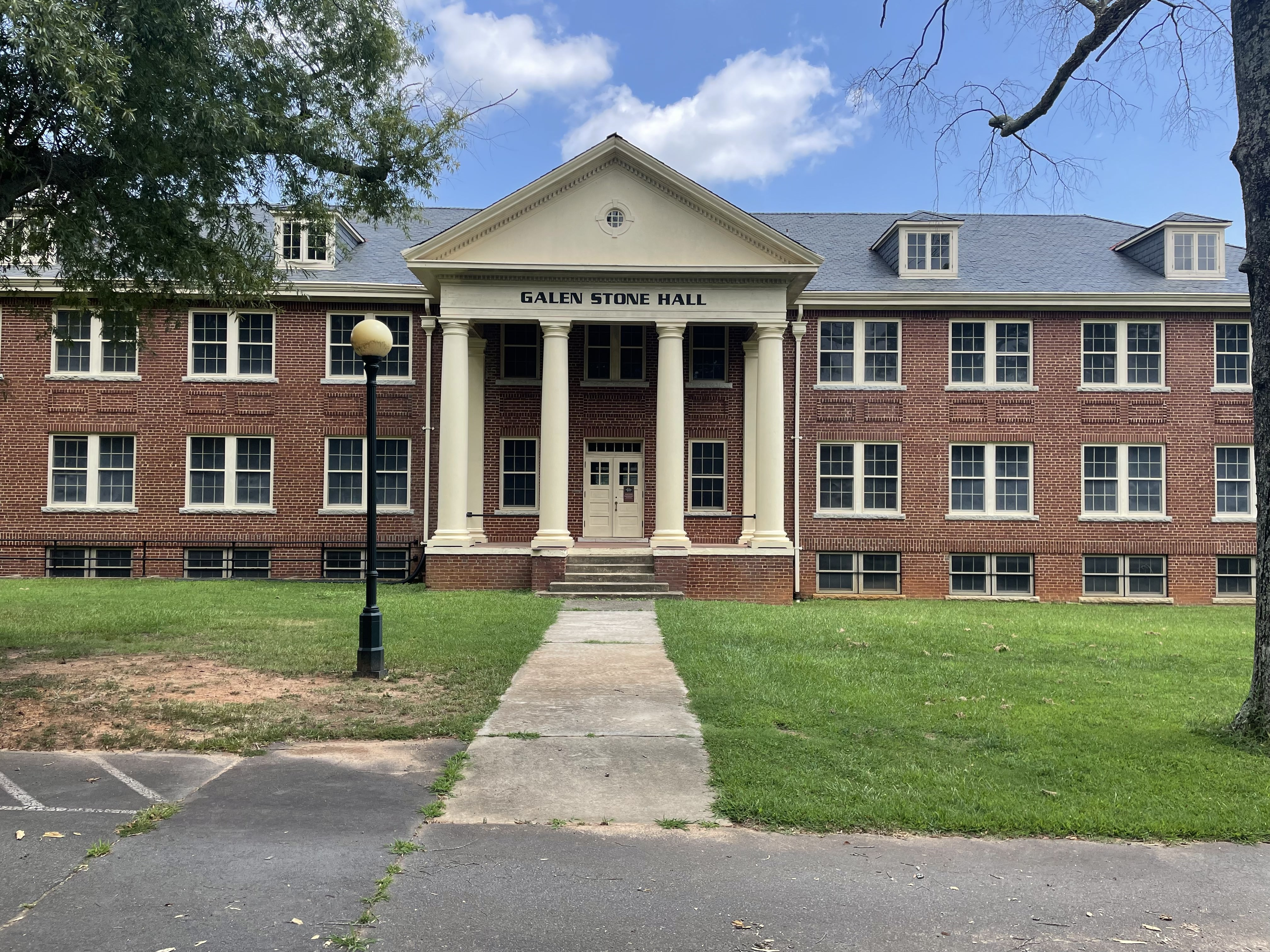
Galen L. Stone Hall (1927) of the former Palmer Memorial Institute, designed in the Colonial Revival style

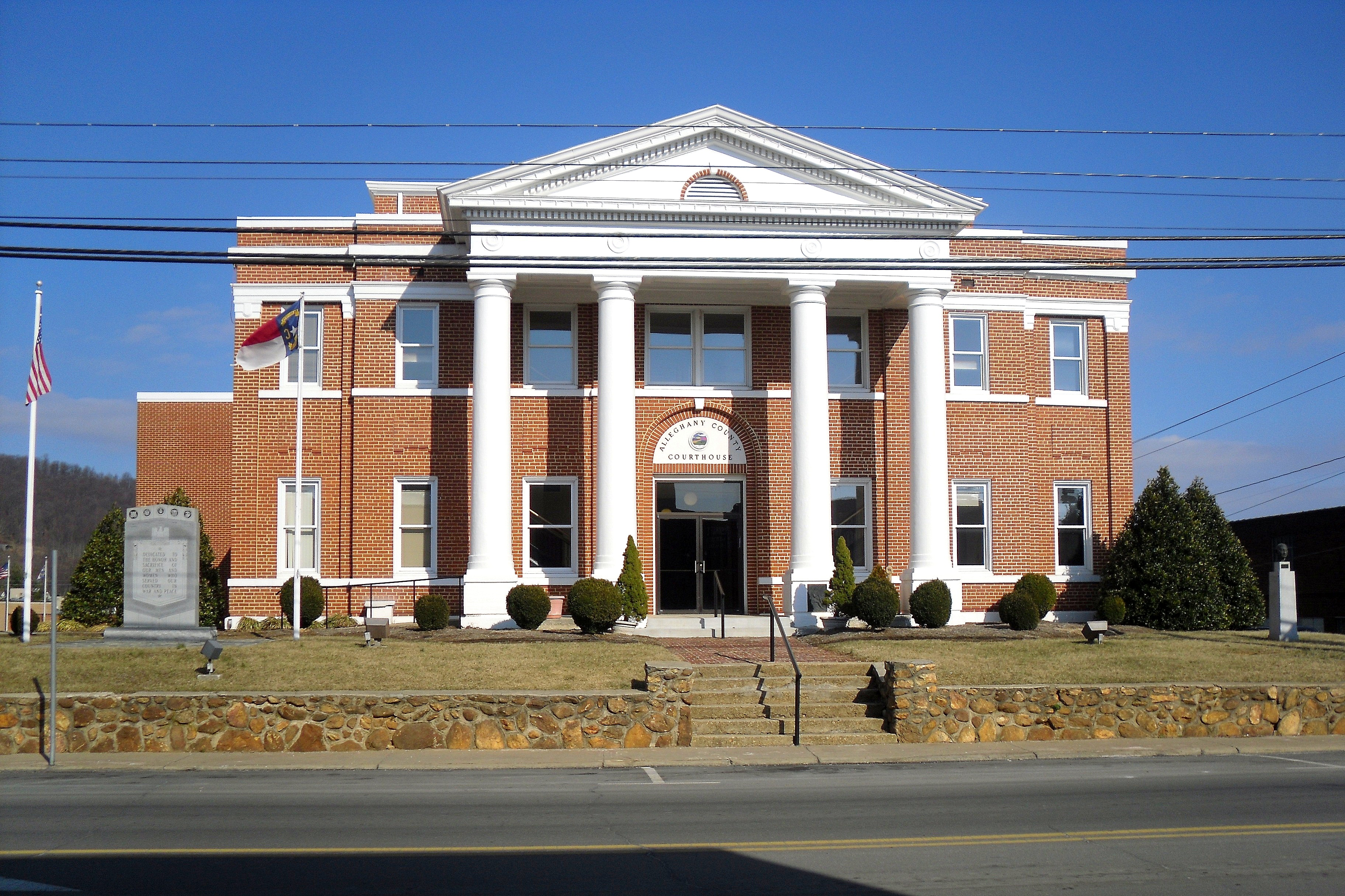
The Alleghany County Courthouse (1933) in Sparta, designed in the Greek Revival style

Harry Barton (June 17, 1876 – May 9, 1937) was an American architect in practice in Greensboro, North Carolina, from 1912 until his death in 1937.

== Life and career ==
Harry Barton was born June 17, 1876, in Philadelphia to Edmund Barton, a contractor and builder, and Emma Barton, née Goodwin. He was educated in the Philadelphia public schools and at the Williamson Free School of Mechanical Trades before going on to Temple University and George Washington University. He worked for several architects in Philadelphia and Washington, DC, and spent a decade working as a draftsman and architect in the office of the Supervising Architect. In 1912 he relocated to Greensboro, North Carolina, which he regarded as a "city with a future." After a brief partnership with architect Frank A. Weston he established an independent office. Within a few years Barton was awarded the commission to design the Guilford County Courthouse (1920, NRHP-listed) and in the 1920s emerged as the city's leading architect.

As an architect Barton designed courthouses, city halls, public schools, churches and other buildings. He designed the majority of the buildings built on the campus of what is now the University of North Carolina at Greensboro in the 1920s. During the Great Depression, Barton maintained his practice with a focus on public projects, such as the Alleghany County Courthouse (1933, NRHP-listed) in Sparta. By this time Barton's chief local competition was Charles C. Hartmann. As the leading local architect Barton was the collaborator of choice for outside architects working in the area; for Hobart Upjohn he supervised construction of the First Presbyterian Church (1929). Barton practiced architecture until his death in 1937.

Typically for an architect of his time, Barton designed his buildings in a wide variety of traditional revival styles, especially the Classical, Georgian and Gothic revivals. Later, he drew on more exotic styles such as the Spanish Colonial and Venetian Gothic revivals or transitional modernist styles such as Art Deco.

== Personal life ==
Barton was married to Rachel S. Phillips; they had three children, all daughters. He was a member of several local and fraternal organizations and the American Institute of Architects (AIA), was an elder of the First Presbyterian Church of Greensboro and sat on the State Board of Architectural Examination and Registration.

Barton died May 9, 1937, in Greensboro at the age of 60.

== Legacy ==
A number of his works, called out below, are listed on the United States National Register of Historic Places (NRHP).

== Architectural works ==
- 1916: Surry County Courthouse, Dobson, North Carolina
  - Designed by Raleigh James Hughes and Harry Barton, joint architects; NRHP-listed
- 1919: Church of the Covenant, Presbyterian (former), Greensboro, North Carolina
  - Contributes to the NRHP-listed College Hill Historic District
- 1919: John Marion Galloway House, Greensboro, North Carolina
  - NRHP-listed and contributes to the NRHP-listed Fisher Park Historic District
- 1920: Buffalo Presbyterian Church, Greensboro, North Carolina
  - Additions and alterations to an 1827-built church; NRHP-listed
- 1920: Guilford County Courthouse, Greensboro, North Carolina
  - NRHP-listed
- 1921: Johnston County Courthouse, Smithfield, North Carolina
  - NRHP-listed
- 1923: Chancellor's House, University of North Carolina at Greensboro, Greensboro, North Carolina
  - As of 2026, used by UNCG Undergraduate Admissions
- 1924: Alamance County Courthouse, Graham, North Carolina
  - NRHP-listed
- 1924: Brown Building, University of North Carolina at Greensboro, Greensboro, North Carolina
- 1924: Cone Export and Commission Company Building, Greensboro, North Carolina
  - As of 2026, an office building known as Foundation Place
- 1924: First United Methodist Church, Asheboro, North Carolina
- 1924: Greensboro Municipal Building, Greensboro, North Carolina
  - Demolished
- 1926: Asbury United Methodist Church, Durham, North Carolina
  - Contributes to the NRHP-listed Trinity Historic District
- 1926: Cumberland County Courthouse, Fayetteville, North Carolina
  - NRHP-listed and contributes to the NRHP-listed Fayetteville Downtown Historic District
- 1926: Curry Building, University of North Carolina at Greensboro, Greensboro, North Carolina
- 1926: Reidsville Municipal Building (former), Reidsville, North Carolina
  - As of 2026, home to the Reidsville Police Department
- 1926: Sigmund Sternberger House, Greensboro, North Carolina
  - NRHP-listed and contributes to the NRHP-listed Summit Avenue Historic District
- 1926: World War Memorial Stadium, Greensboro, North Carolina
  - NRHP-listed
- 1927: Auditorium, University of North Carolina at Greensboro, Greensboro, North Carolina
  - Formerly named for Charles Brantley Aycock
- 1927: High Point Central High School, High Point, North Carolina
- 1927: Piedmont Building, Greensboro, North Carolina
- 1927: Galen L. Stone Hall, Palmer Memorial Institute (former), Sedalia, North Carolina
  - Contributes to the NRHP-listed Palmer Memorial Institute Historic District
- 1928: First Presbyterian Church, High Point, North Carolina
  - Designed by Harry Barton and Hobart Upjohn, joint architects
- 1929: First Presbyterian Church, Greensboro, North Carolina
  - Designed by Hobart Upjohn, architect, with Harry Barton, associate architect; contributes to the NRHP-listed Fisher Park Historic District
- 1930: First Baptist Church, Siler City, North Carolina
  - Contributes to the NRHP-listed North Third Avenue Historic District
- 1931: Masonic Temple, Mount Airy, North Carolina
- 1933: Alleghany County Courthouse, Sparta, North Carolina
  - NRHP-listed
