= Halifax County Courthouse =

Halifax County Courthouse may refer to:

- Halifax County Courthouse (North Carolina), Halifax, North Carolina
- Halifax County Courthouse (Virginia), Halifax, Virginia
