= Graham County Courthouse =

Graham County Courthouse may refer to:

- Graham County Courthouse (Arizona), Safford, Arizona
- Graham County Courthouse (Kansas), Hill City, Kansas
- Graham County Courthouse (North Carolina), Robbinsville, North Carolina
