= Sigmund Sternberger House =

Historic house in North Carolina, United States

- U.S. National Register of Historic Places
- U.S. Historic district – Contributing property
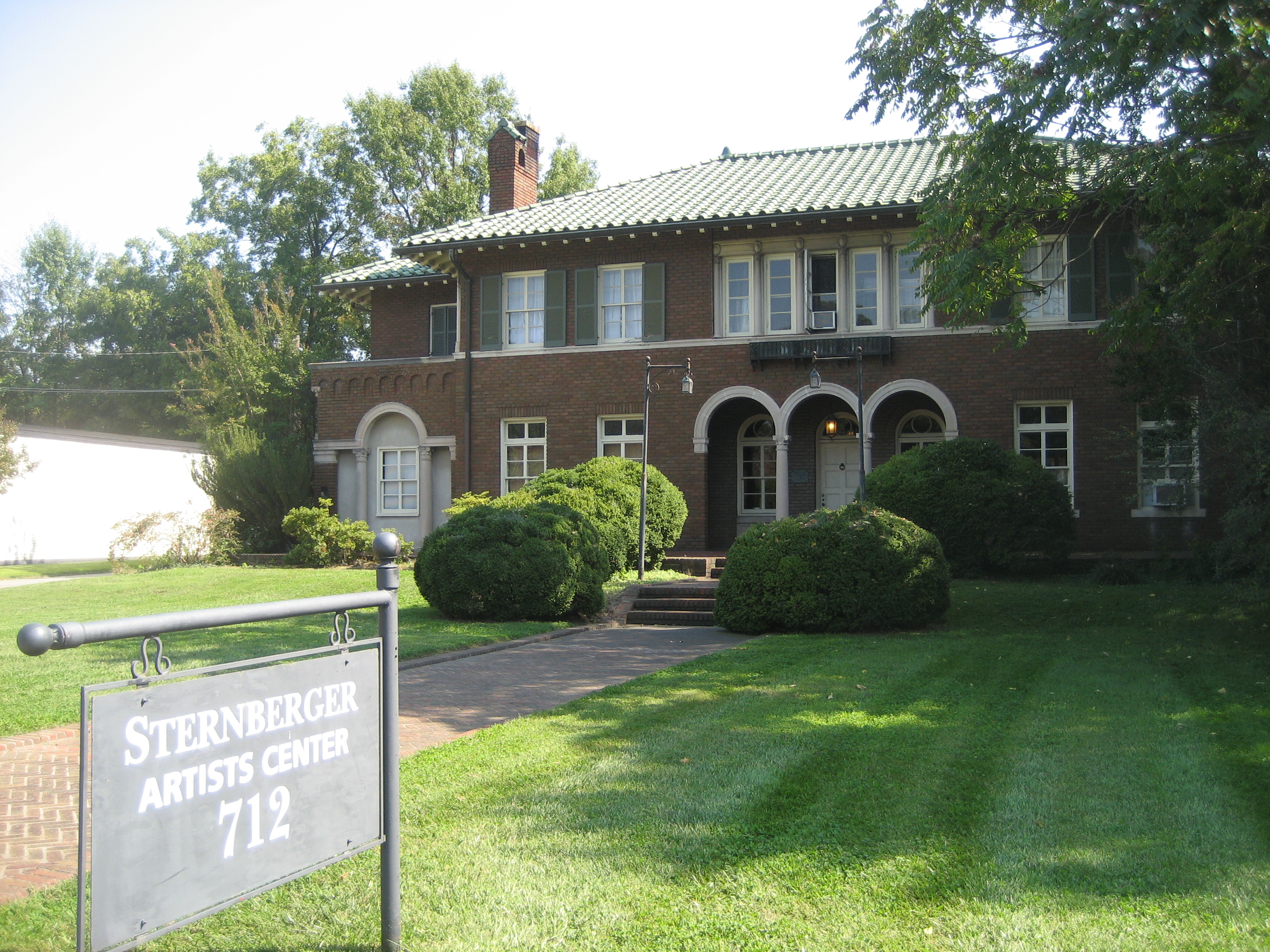
- Sigmund Sternberger House, September 2012

- Location within North Carolina Location within the United States
- Location: 712 Summit Ave., Greensboro, North Carolina
- Coordinates: 36°4′52″N 79°46′44″W
- Area: less than one acre
- Built: 1926
- Architect: Barton, Harry
- Architectural style: Renaissance
- MPS: Greensboro MPS
- NRHP reference No.: 93000302
- Added to NRHP: April 16, 1993

Sigmund Sternberger House is a historic home located at Greensboro, Guilford County, North Carolina. It was designed by architect Harry Barton and built in 1926. It is a two-story villa in the Renaissance Revival style. It is constructed of deep red bricks, green ceramic tiles, and sculpted gray limestone. The house features arcades and Venetian-arched porches. Also on the property are two contributing outbuildings and a contributing brick retaining wall. It has served at the home of the Sternberger Artists' Center since 1964.

It was listed on the National Register of Historic Places in 1993. It is located in the Summit Avenue Historic District.
