= Avery County Jail =

Museum and former jail in North Carolina, US

- U.S. National Register of Historic Places
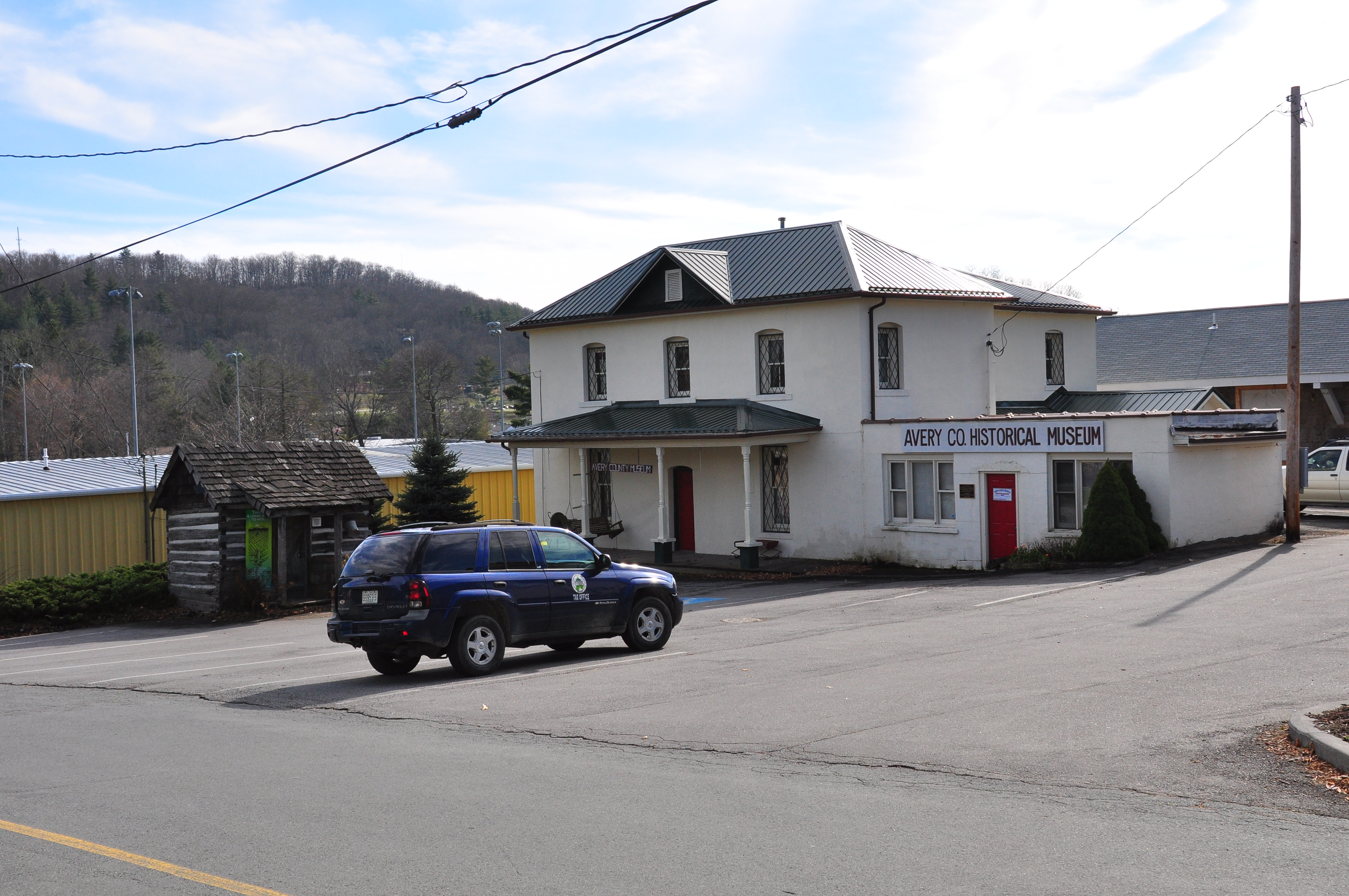

- Location within North Carolina Location within the United States
- Location: 1829 Schultz Cir., Newland, North Carolina
- Coordinates: 36°5′13″N 81°55′36″W
- Area: less than one acre
- Built: 1913
- Architect: Wheeler & Runge; Campbell, R.C.
- Architectural style: Italianate
- NRHP reference No.: 99001494
- Added to NRHP: December 9, 1999

The Avery County Jail, also known as Avery County Historical Museum, is a historic jail located at Newland, Avery County, North Carolina. It was built in 1913. It was designed by architects Wheeler & Runge in Italianate style. It is a two-story, stuccoed brick building with small one-story wings and a cross-hipped roof. A one-story wing was added in the 1960s.

It was listed on the National Register of Historic Places in 1999.
