= Spanish Oak Mountain =

Mountain in North Carolina, United States

- Location within North Carolina

Highest point
- Elevation: 4,531 ft (1,381 m)
- Coordinates: 36°04′05″N 81°56′23″W

Geography
- Location: Avery County, North Carolina, U.S.
- Parent range: Blue Ridge Mountains
- Topo map: USGS Newland

Spanish Oak Mountain is a mountain in the North Carolina High Country, located southwest from the town of Newland. Its elevation reaches 4,531 ft (1,381 m). Most feeder streams from the mountain flow to the North Toe River; except for White Pine Creek, from its southeastern slope, which flows to the Linville River. The mountain is partitioned by the Eastern Continental Divide.

The mountain is named after Spanish Oak, a type of red oak, which can be found on the mountain. The mountain is predominantly covered by Fraser Fir farms, a popular choice of Christmas tree.
