= Louis E. Schwend =

American architect

- Born: 1875
- Died: November 24, 1900 (aged 24–25); Cincinnati, Ohio
- Occupation: architect
- Known for: Hayden, Wheeler, and Schwend, Charlotte, North Carolina
- Notable work: Iredell County Courthouse
- Parents: Max Schwend (lithographer) (father); Mary Schwend (mother)

Louis E. Schwend (1875 – November 24, 1900) was an architect in North Carolina at the firm of Hayden, Wheeler, and Schwend. He designed the Iredell County Courthouse (1899), prototype for a series of similar courthouse designs executed by the successor firms of Oliver Duke Wheeler and his partners.

Schwend was born in Cincinnati, Ohio to Max Schwend, a lithographer from Saxony, and Mary Schwend of New York. Oliver D. Wheeler and Luke Hayden moved their office from Atlanta to Charlotte and brought Schwend on as a partner in 1899. He returned to Cincinnati and died of heart disease on November 24, 1900. He is buried in Spring Grove Cemetery in a lot owned by his grandmother, Adelheid Hessinger.
