= Oakwood Historic District (Hickory, North Carolina) =

Historic district in North Carolina, United States

- U.S. National Register of Historic Places
- U.S. Historic district
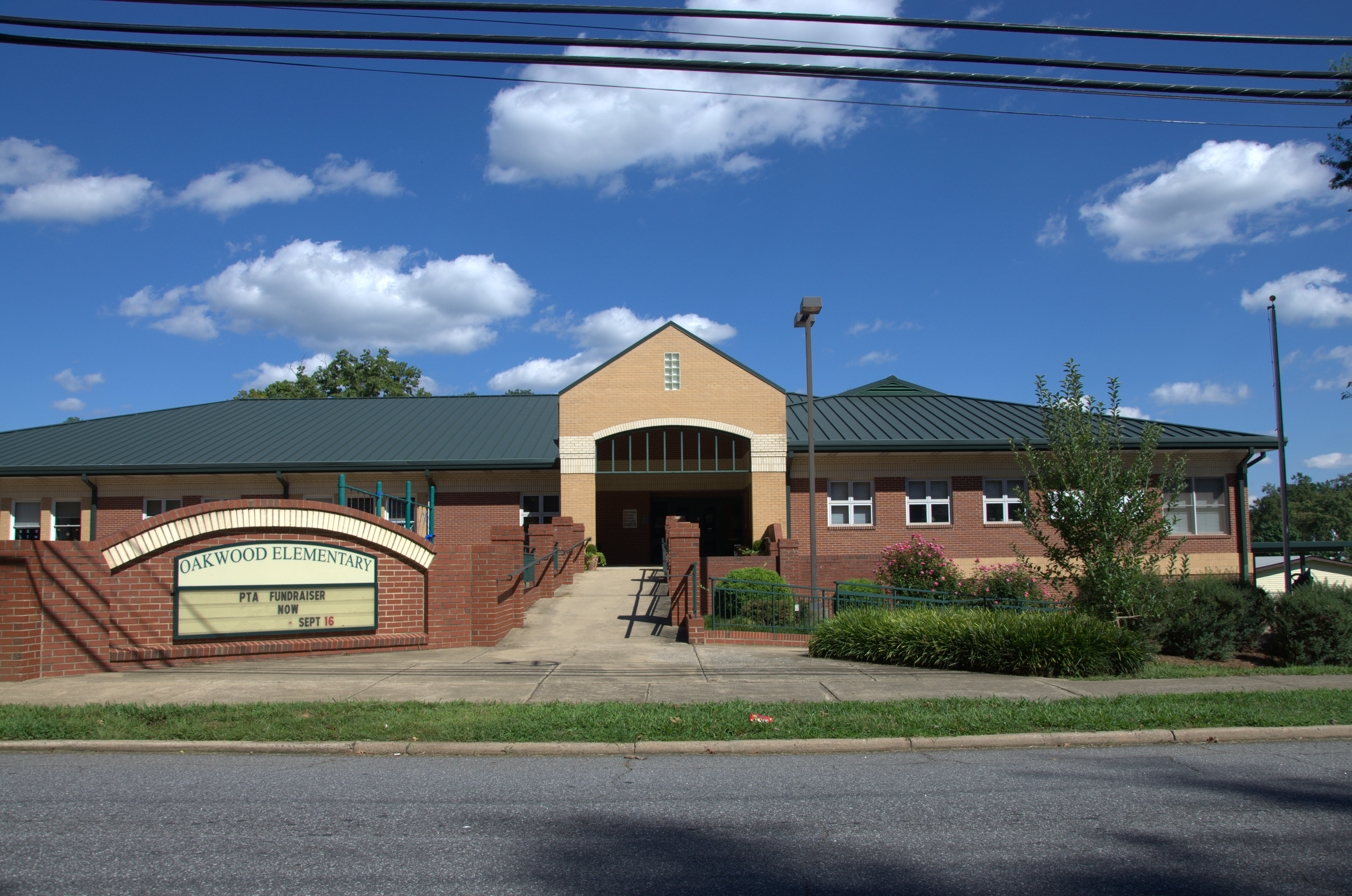
- Oakwood Elementary School

- Location within North Carolina Location within the United States
- Location: Roughly bounded by Oakwood Cemetery and Fourth Ave. NW, Fourth St. NW, Second Ave. NW, and Sixth St. NW, Hickory, North Carolina; also portions of 1st Ave. NW, 2nd Ave. NW, 2nd St. NW, 2nd Pl. NW, 3rd Ave. NW, 3rd St. NW, 4th Ave. NW, 4 Ave. Dr. NW, 4th St. NW, 5th St. NW, 6th St. NW, 7th St. NW, 8th St. NW, and N. Center St., and by 8th St. NW, 6th Ave. NW, N. Center St., and 1st. Ave.,
- Coordinates: 35°44′15″N 81°20′43″W
- Area: 55 acres (22 ha)
- Architect: Wheeler & Stearn; Et al.
- Architectural style: Colonial Revival, Bungalow/Craftsman, Queen Anne
- MPS: Hickory MRA
- NRHP reference No.: 86000687 (original); 100003928 (increase)

Significant dates
- Added to NRHP: March 25, 1986
- Boundary increase: May 8, 2019

Oakwood Historic District is a national historic district located at Hickory, Catawba County, North Carolina. It includes work designed by architects Wheeler & Stearn. It encompasses 50 contributing buildings, 1 contributing site (Oakwood Cemetery), and 1 contributing structure in an upscale residential section of Hickory. It includes notable examples of Colonial Revival, Bungalow / American Craftsman, and Queen Anne style architecture dating from the 1880s to 1930s. Notable buildings include the Robert E. Simpson House (1922), Walker Lyerly House (1913), Cline-Wilfong House (1912), Abel A. Shuford, II House (c. 1905), Paul A. Setzer House (1927), John H. P. Cilley House (1912), (first) Charles H. Geitner House (1900), Benjamin F. Seagle House (c. 1907), David L. Russell House (c. 1908, 1914), Robert W. Stevenson House (c. 1896), Jones W. Shuford House (1907), Dr. Robert T. Hambrick House (1928), Alfred P. Whitener House (c. 1906), and J. Summie Propst House (1881-1883).

It was listed on the National Register of Historic Places in 1986, and enlarged in 2019.
