= Asbury United Methodist Church (Durham, North Carolina) =

Methodist church in Durham, North Carolina

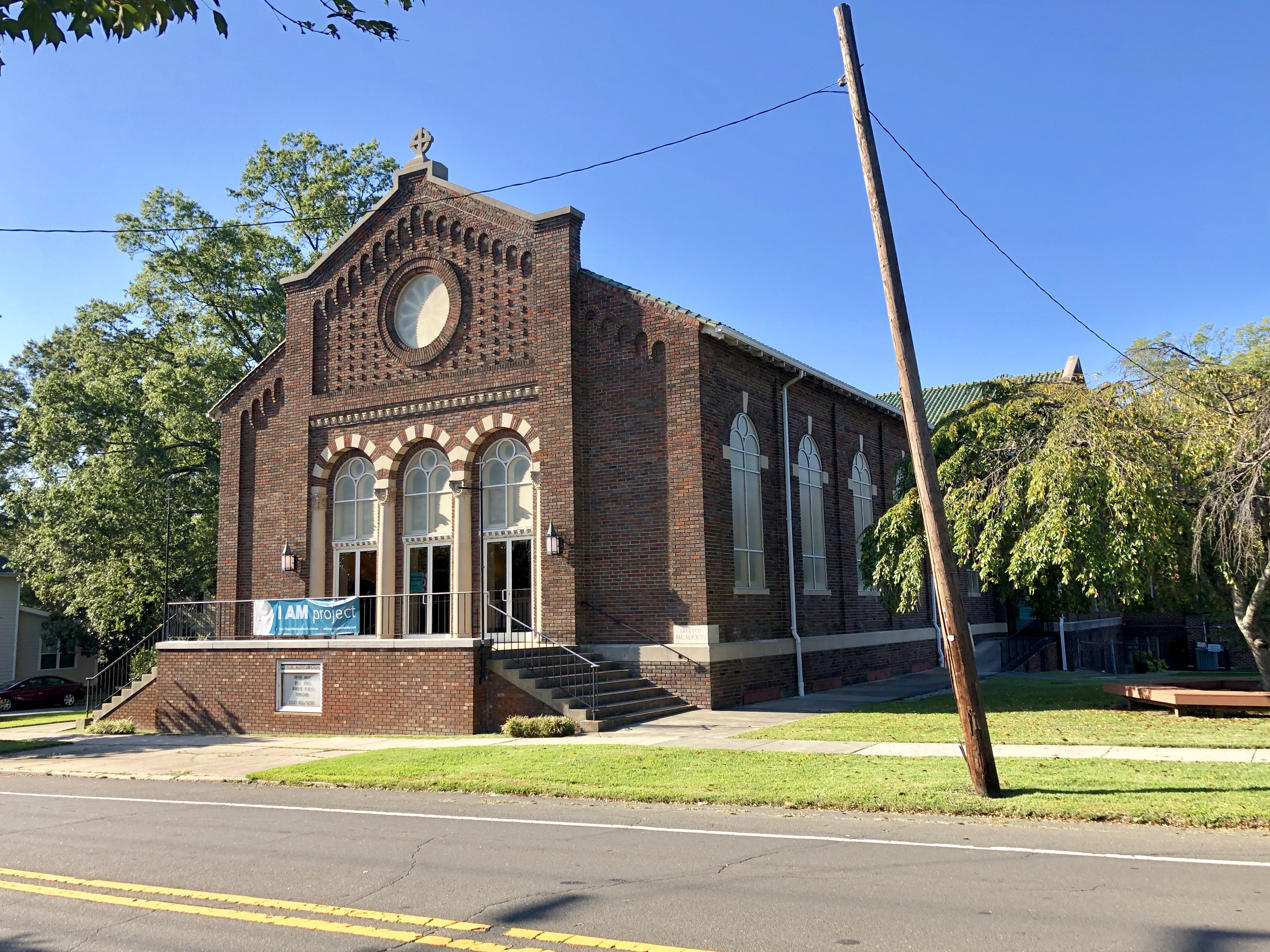
- Asbury United Methodist Church in 2019

Religion
- Affiliation: Methodist Episcopal Church, South (formerly); United Methodist
- Status: Active

Location
- Location: 806 Clarendon Street; Durham, North Carolina, United States
- Interactive map of Asbury United Methodist Church
- Coordinates: 36°0′36″N 78°55′5″W

Architecture
- Architect: Harry Barton
- Type: Renaissance Revival
- Completed: 1926

Website
- asburyunitedmethodist.com

Asbury United Methodist Church is a historic Methodist church in the Trinity Heights neighborhood in Durham, North Carolina.

== History ==
The church was established in 1894 as West Durham Methodist Episcopal Church South in West Durham.

The current building, designed by Greensboro architect Harry Barton, was completed in 1926 in the Trinity Heights neighborhood. As part of the Methodist Episcopal Church, South, the congregation was racially segregated and excluded African-Americans until the 1950s. The congregation was renamed Asbury Methodist Church in 1944.

In 2021, the church formed the Durham Central Mission Cooperative with three other United Methodist congregations, Iglesia La Aemilla, Six:Eight Church, and Airo Community.
