= Summit Avenue Historic District =

United States historic place

- U.S. National Register of Historic Places
- U.S. Historic district
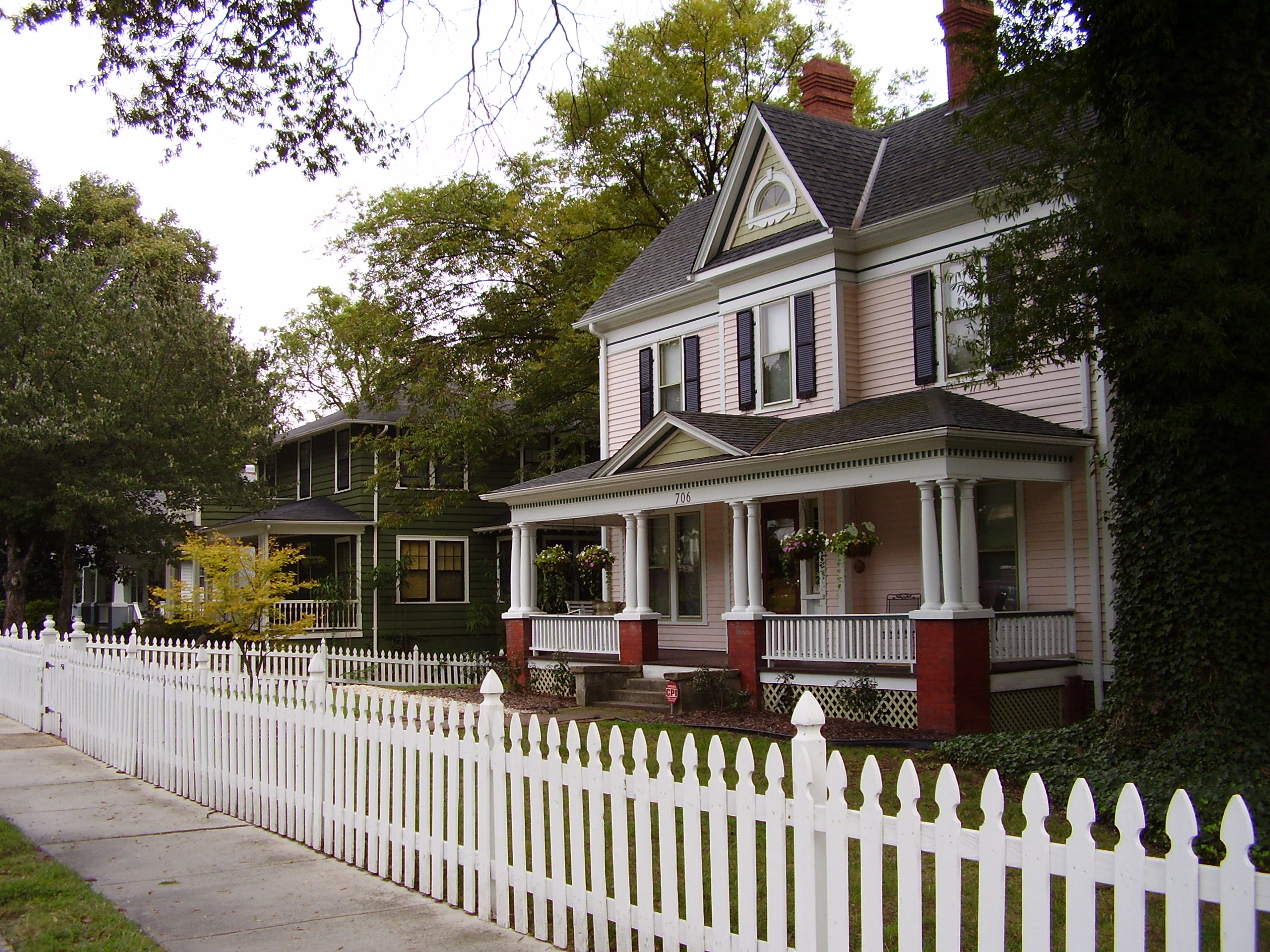
- Summit Avenue Historic District, June 2007

- Location within North Carolina Location within the United States
- Location: Roughly bounded by Chestnut, E. Bessemer, Cypress, Dewey, Park, and Percy Sts., Greensboro, North Carolina
- Coordinates: 36°04′54″N 79°46′55″W
- Area: 95 acres (38 ha)
- Built: 1895
- Architect: Barton, Harry; Starrett and Van Vleck
- Architectural style: Queen Anne, Bungalow/craftsman, Foursquare
- MPS: Greensboro MPS
- NRHP reference No.: 93000768
- Added to NRHP: August 5, 1993

Summit Avenue Historic District, also known as the Dunleath Historic District and formally as the Charles B. Aycock Historic District, is a national historic district located at Greensboro, Guilford County, North Carolina. The district encompasses 226 contributing buildings in a middle- and upper-class residential section of Greensboro. The houses were largely built between the 1890s and 1930s and include notable examples of Queen Anne, Colonial Revival, American Foursquare, and Bungalow / American Craftsman-style architecture. The Sigmund Sternberger House (1926) is listed separately. Other notable buildings include the John C. Clapp House (c. 1900–1905), Robert L. Potts House (c. 1900–1905), William B. Vaught House (c. 1906), Edgar B. Jennette House (c. 1925–1930), and the Charles B. Aycock School (1922) designed by Starrett & van Vleck.

It was listed on the National Register of Historic Places in 1993.
