= Historic Ashe County Courthouse =

Historic courthouse in North Carolina, US

- U.S. National Register of Historic Places
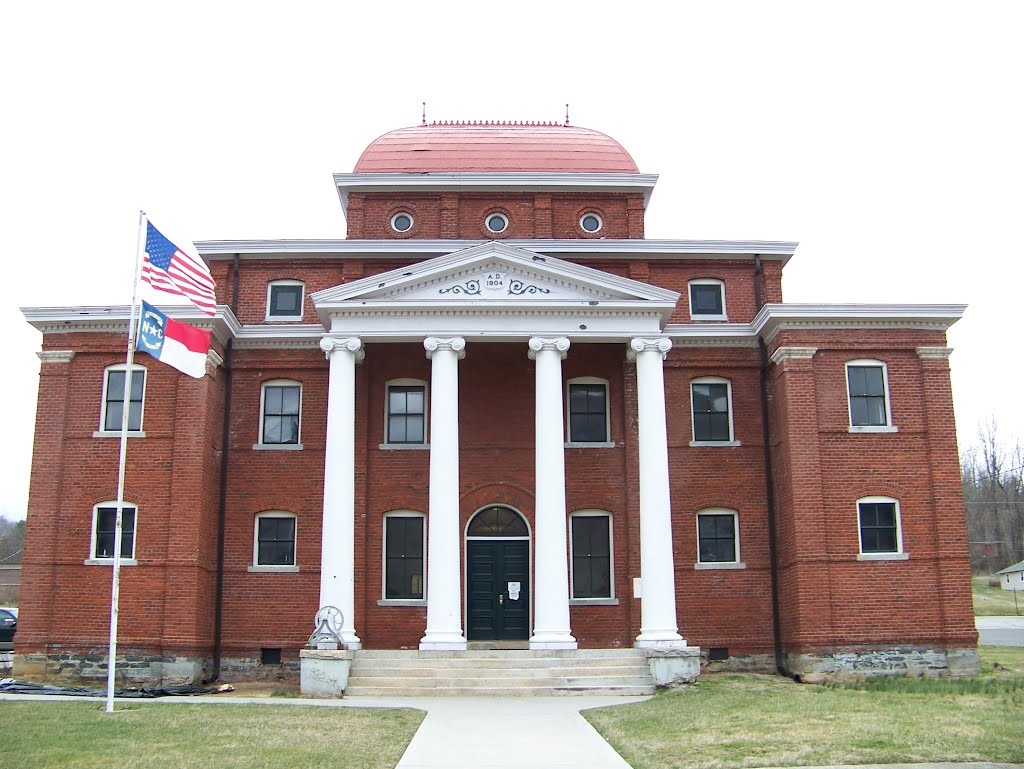

- Location within North Carolina Location within the United States
- Location: 301 E. Main St., Jefferson, North Carolina
- Coordinates: 36°25′15″N 81°28′13″W
- Area: 1 acre (0.40 ha)
- Built: 1904
- Architect: Wheeler & Runge, L.W. Cooper
- Architectural style: Beaux Arts
- MPS: North Carolina County Courthouses TR
- NRHP reference No.: 79001658
- Added to NRHP: May 10, 1979

The Historic Ashe County Courthouse in Jefferson, North Carolina is a Beaux Arts style building built in 1904. It was designed by architects Wheeler & Runge.

It was listed on the National Register of Historic Places in 1979.

Ashe County's present-day courthouse was built in 2000, located on Government Circle in Jefferson.

== Museum of Ashe County History ==
The Museum of Ashe County History has been restored and is located within the historic Ashe County Courthouse. Exhibits include photos, artifacts from area industries, a railroad room with a model train layout and railroad artifacts, a room honoring Ashe County veterans, and the Ashe County Sports Hall of Fame.
