= Cumberland County Courthouse (North Carolina) =

- U.S. National Register of Historic Places
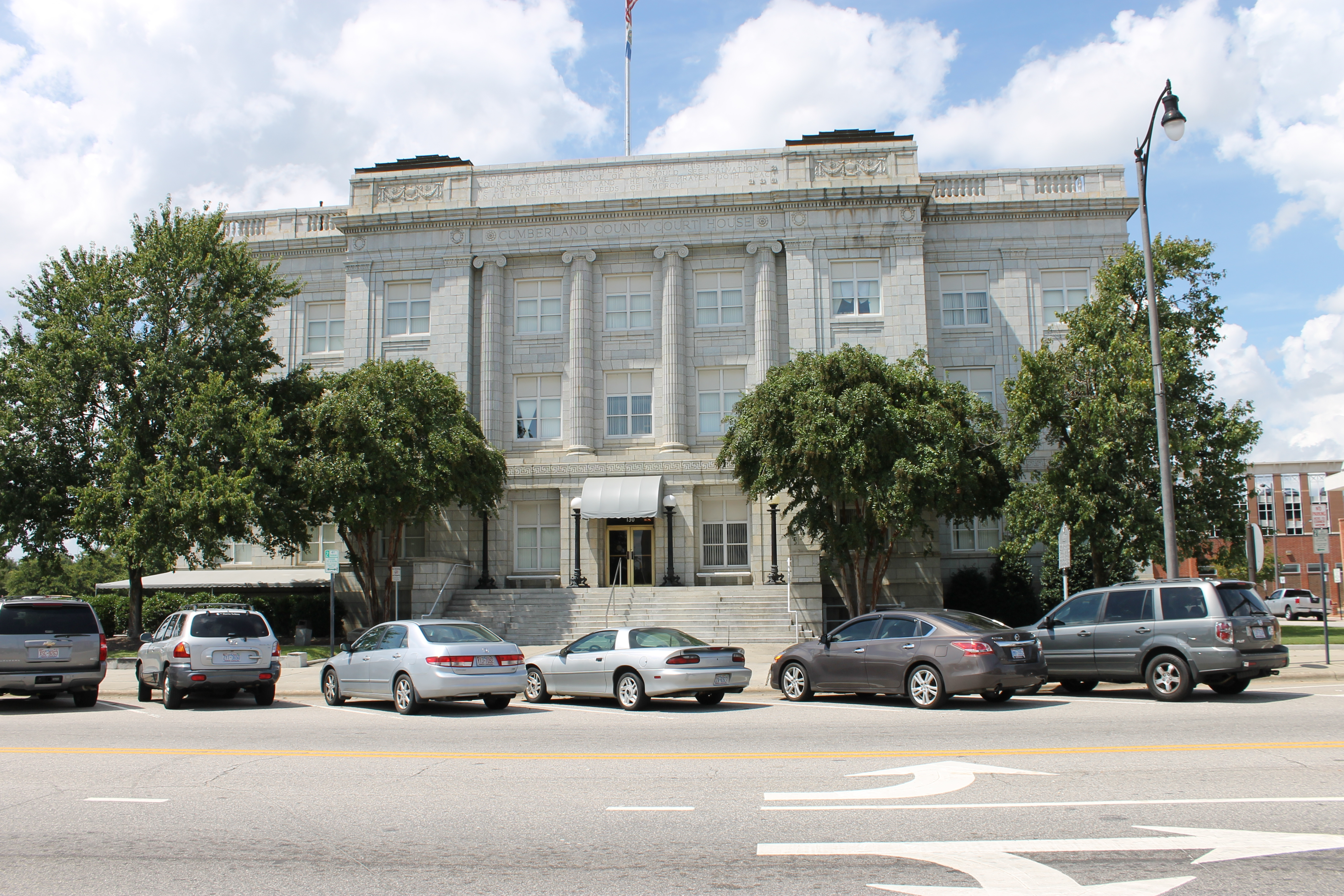
- Old Cumberland County Courthouse, September 2014

- Location within North Carolina Location within the United States
- Interactive map showing the location of Cumberland County Courthouse
- Location: Franklin, Gillespie, and Russell Sts., Fayetteville, North Carolina
- Coordinates: 35°3′5″N 78°52′45″W
- Area: less than one acre
- Built: 1925-1926
- Architect: Barton, Harry
- Architectural style: Classical Revival
- MPS: North Carolina County Courthouses TR
- NRHP reference No.: 79001696
- Added to NRHP: May 10, 1979

Cumberland County Courthouse is a historic courthouse building located at Fayetteville, North Carolina. It was designed by architect Harry Barton and built in 1925–1926. It is a three-story, rectangular, Classical Revival style building sheathed in ashlar veneer.

It was listed on the National Register of Historic Places in 1979.
