= Johnston County Courthouse =

- U.S. National Register of Historic Places
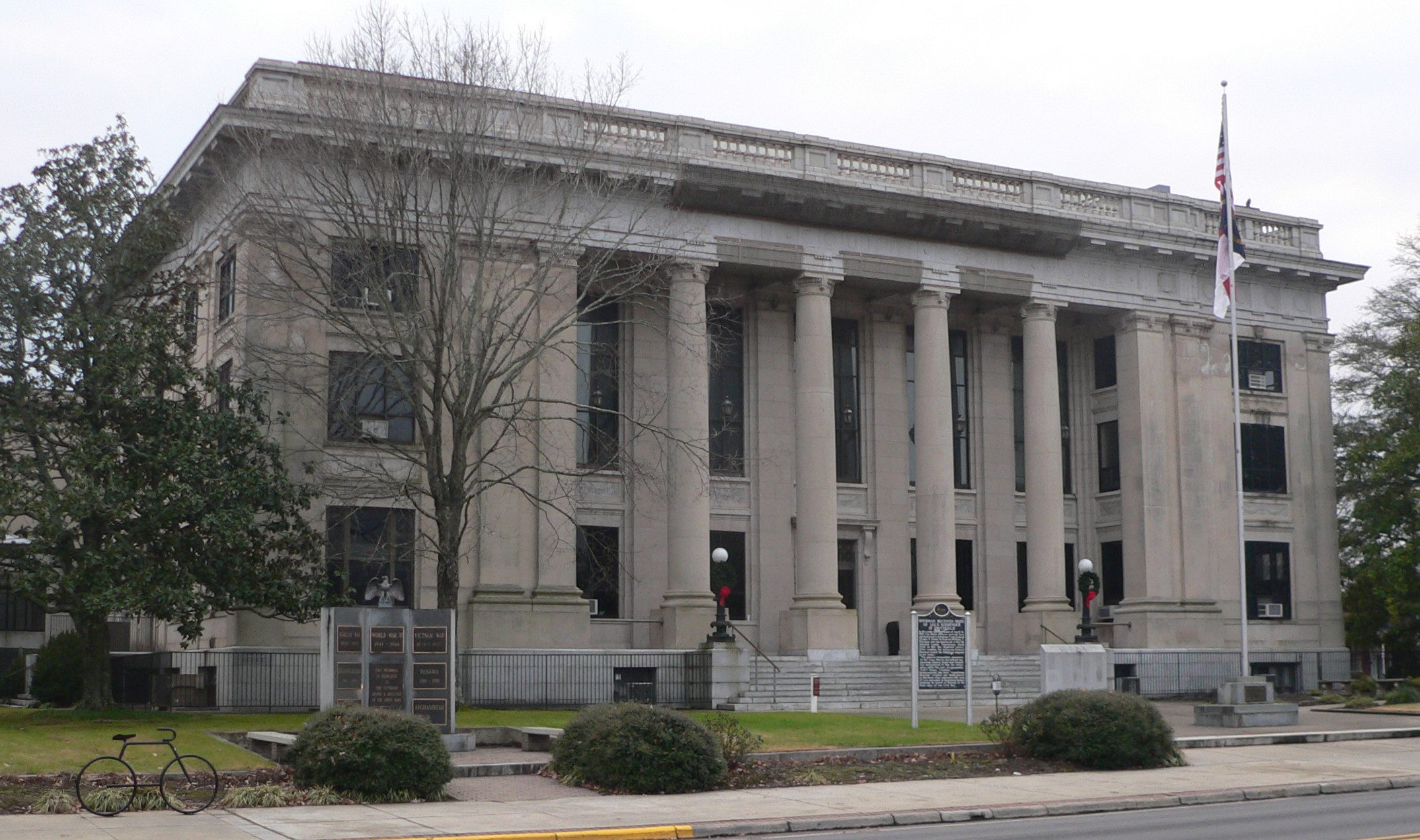
- Johnston County Courthouse, December 2014

- Location within North Carolina Location within the United States
- Location: 207 E. Johnston St., Smithfield, North Carolina
- Coordinates: 35°30′40″N 78°20′52″W
- Area: less than one acre
- Built: 1920-1921
- Architect: Harry Barton
- Architectural style: Classical Revival
- MPS: North Carolina County Courthouses TR
- NRHP reference No.: 79001728
- Added to NRHP: May 10, 1979

Johnston County Courthouse is a historic courthouse building located at Smithfield, Johnston County, North Carolina. It was designed by architect Harry Barton and built in 1920–1921. It is a three-story, rectangular steel frame building with a cut stone veneer in the Classical Revival style. It features a four-column portico in antis, a tetrastyle pedimented portico, and a stone balustrade at the roofline.

It was listed on the National Register of Historic Places in 1979.
