= Alleghany County Courthouse (North Carolina) =

- U.S. National Register of Historic Places
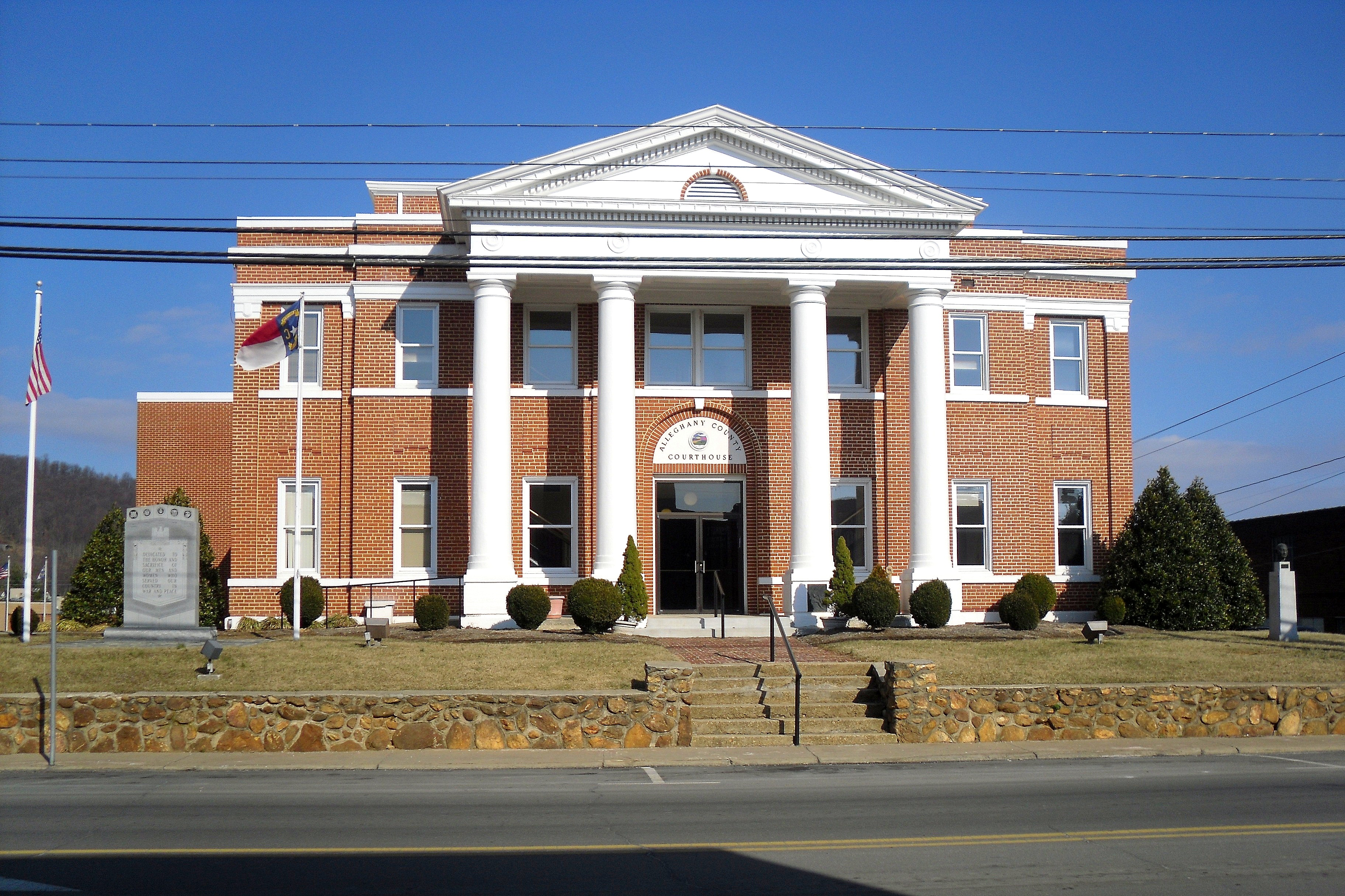
- Alleghany County Courthouse, November 2008

- Location within North Carolina Location within the United States
- Location: Main and Whitehead Sts., Sparta, North Carolina
- Coordinates: 36°30′21″N 81°7′15″W
- Area: less than one acre
- Built: 1933
- Architect: Harry Barton
- Architectural style: Classical Revival
- MPS: North Carolina County Courthouses TR
- NRHP reference No.: 79001657
- Added to NRHP: May 10, 1979

Alleghany County Courthouse is a historic courthouse building located at Sparta, Alleghany County, North Carolina. It was built in 1933, and is a two-story, H-shaped Classical Revival-style brick building. The front facade features a tetrastyle Tuscan order portico. It was built after "The Big Fire" of 1932 destroyed the courthouse and a block of businesses and homes.

It was listed on the National Register of Historic Places in 1979.
