= Guilford County Courthouse =

- U.S. National Register of Historic Places
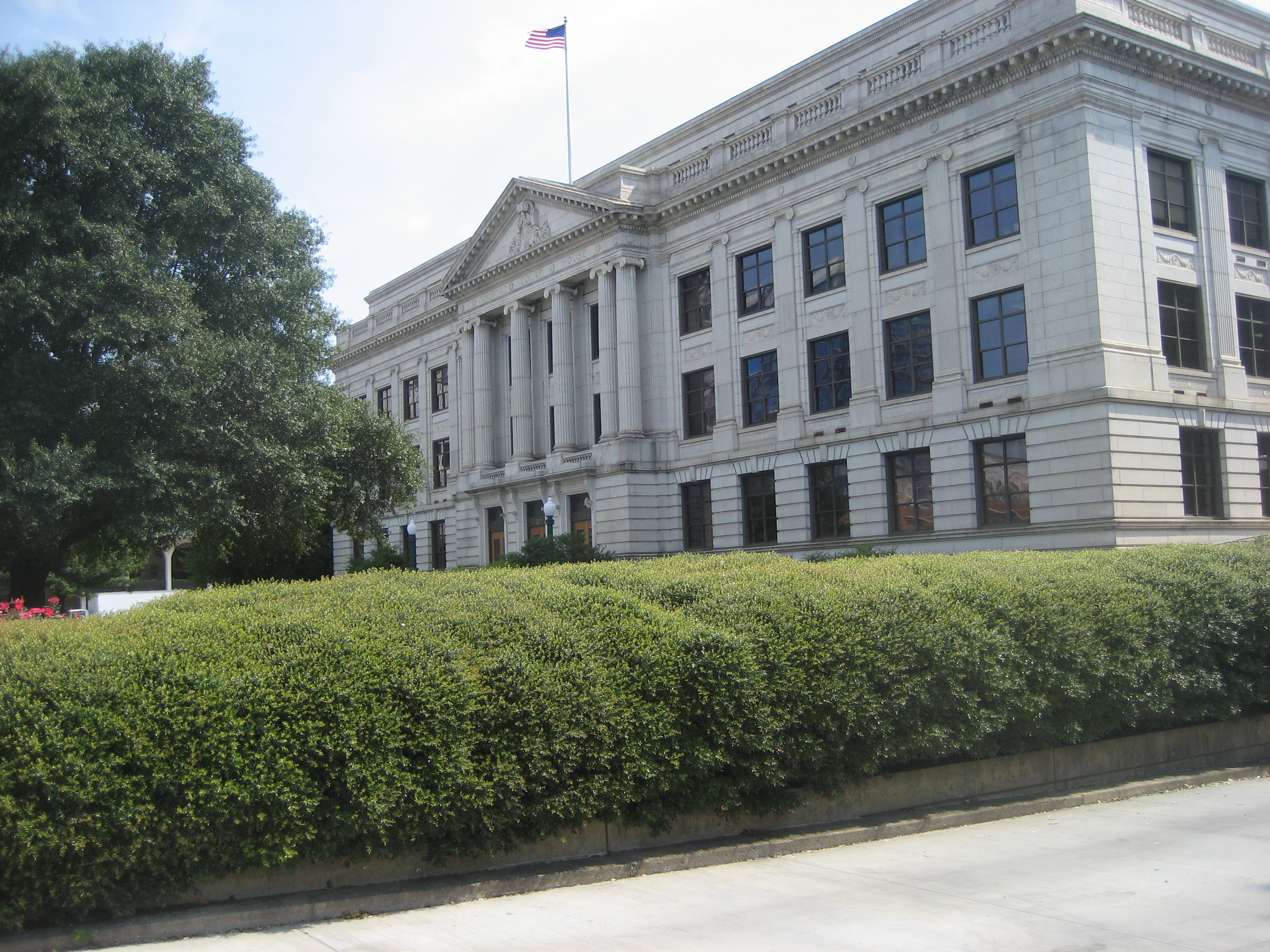
- Guilford County Courthouse, September 2012

- Location within North Carolina Location within the United States
- Location: Market St., Greensboro, North Carolina
- Coordinates: 36°4′20″N 79°47′34″W
- Area: less than one acre
- Built: 1918-1920
- Architect: Barton, Harry; Rose, William P.
- Architectural style: Renaissance
- MPS: North Carolina County Courthouses TR
- NRHP reference No.: 79001714
- Added to NRHP: May 10, 1979

Guilford County Courthouse is a historic courthouse building located at Greensboro, Guilford County, North Carolina. It was designed by architect Harry Barton and built between 1918 and 1920. It is a five-story, rectangular Renaissance Revival building. It has a rusticated raised basement, fluted Ionic pilasters on the upper three stories, a stone balustrade, and a shallow pedimented hexastyle portico. It served as the courthouse until 1974 when it became part of the county complex which combines the old and new courthouses as the center of county government.

It was listed on the National Register of Historic Places in 1979.
