= Avery County Courthouse =

- U.S. National Register of Historic Places
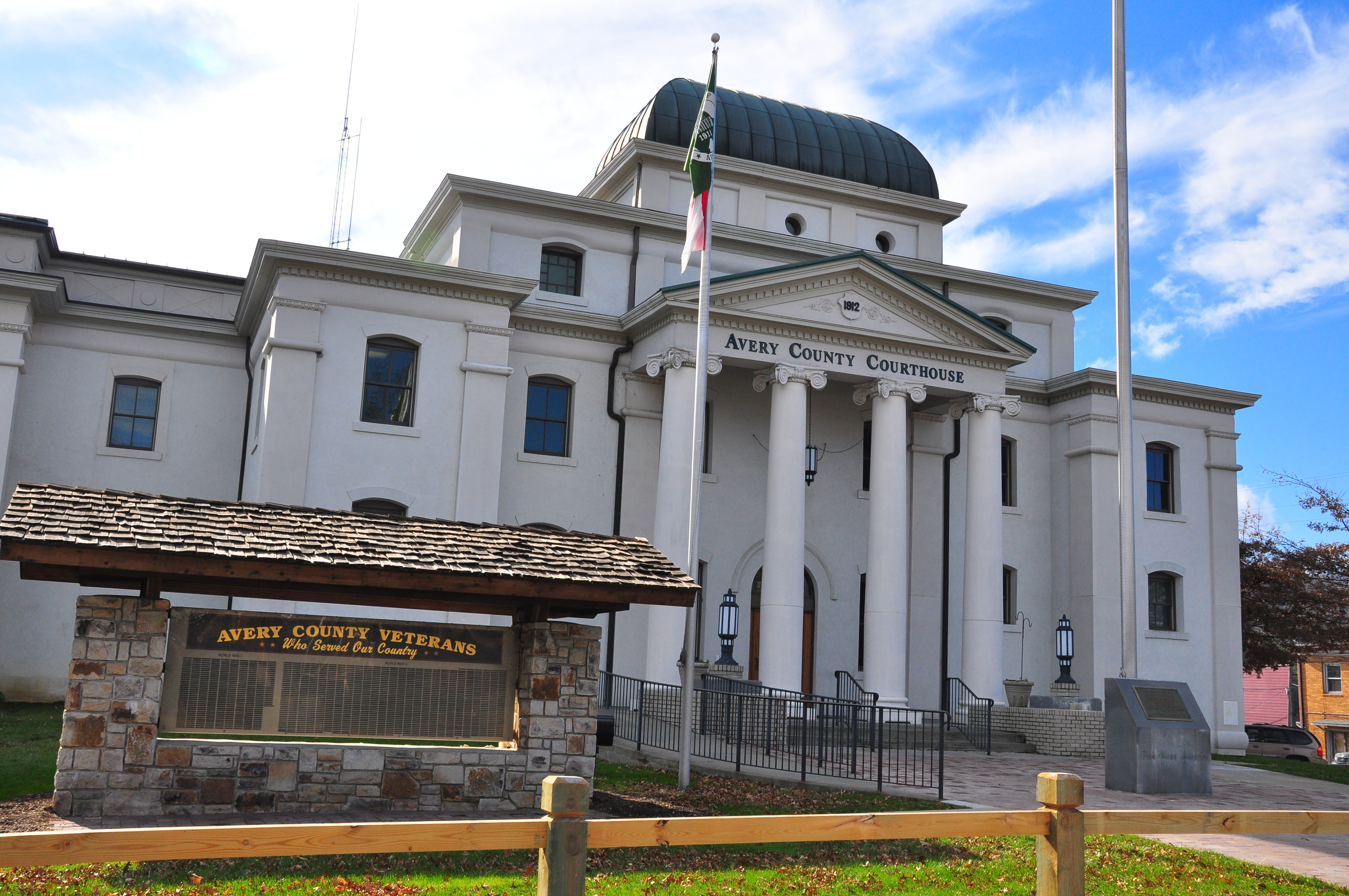

- Location within North Carolina Location within the United States
- Location: Montezuma St. and Courthouse Dr., Newland, North Carolina
- Coordinates: 36°5′12″N 81°55′37″W
- Area: less than one acre
- Built: 1900
- Architect: Wheeler & Runge; Campbell, R.C.
- Architectural style: Beaux Arts
- MPS: North Carolina County Courthouses TR
- NRHP reference No.: 79001660
- Added to NRHP: May 10, 1979

The Avery County Courthouse is a historic courthouse building located at Newland, Avery County, North Carolina. It was designed by Wheeler & Runge and was built in 1912. It has included both a courthouse and a correctional facility.

It was listed on the National Register of Historic Places in 1979.
