= Surry County Courthouse =

Historic courthouse in North Carolina, US

- U.S. National Register of Historic Places
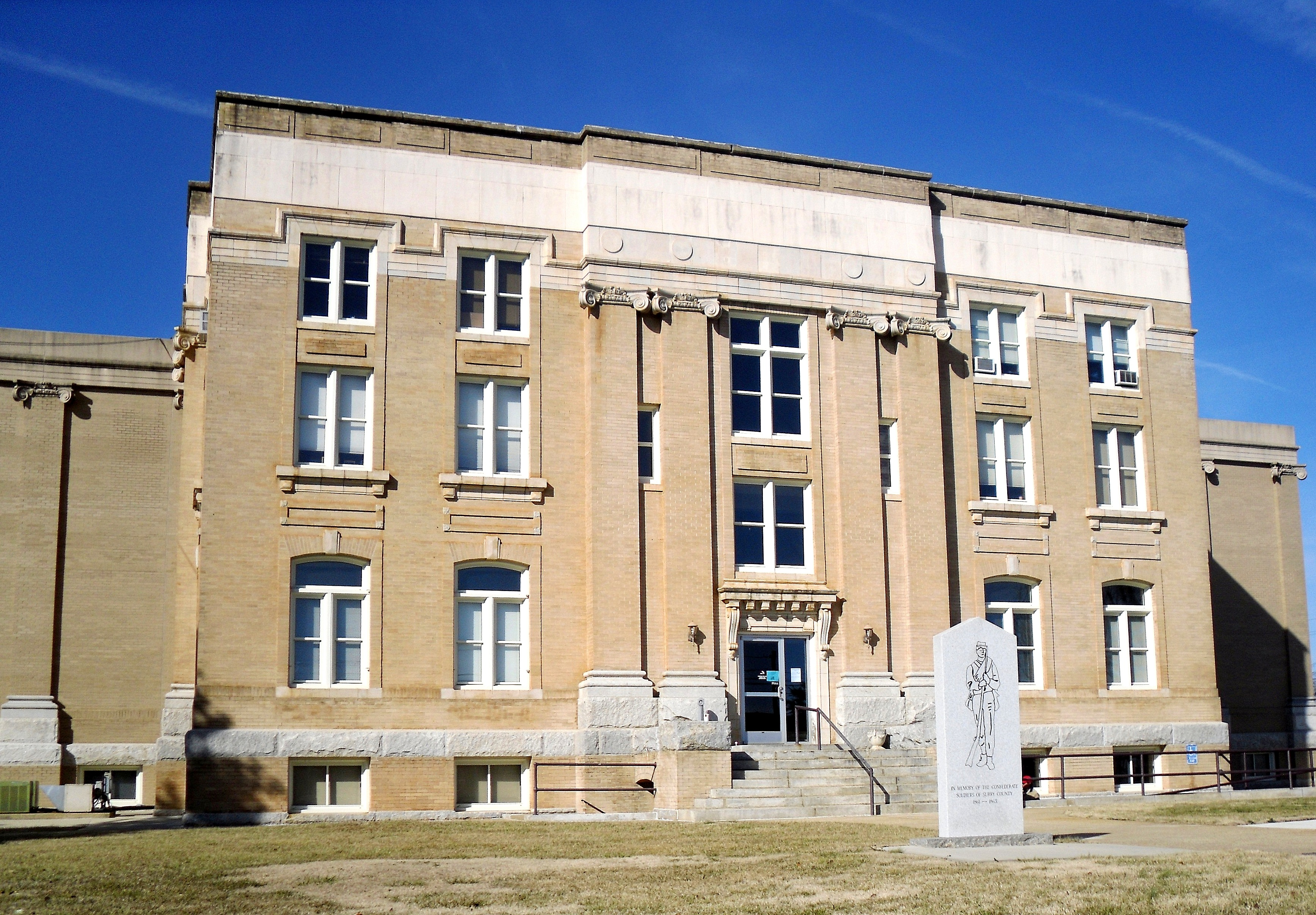
- Surry County Courthouse, December 2008

- Location within North Carolina Location within the United States
- Location: N. Main St. between School and Kapp Sts., Dobson, North Carolina
- Coordinates: 36°23′45″N 80°43′25″W
- Area: less than one acre
- Built: 1916
- Architect: Raleigh James Hughes and Harry Barton
- Architectural style: Classical Revival
- MPS: North Carolina County Courthouses TR
- NRHP reference No.: 79001751
- Added to NRHP: May 10, 1979

Surry County Courthouse is a historic courthouse building located at Dobson, North Carolina, United States. It was designed by Greensboro architects Raleigh James Hughes and Harry Barton and built in 1916. It is a three-story, rectangular Classical Revival-style tan brick building. The five bay front and rear elevations feature a central entrance flanked by pairs of Ionic order pilasters. Two-story wings were added to the main block in 1971.

It was listed on the National Register of Historic Places in 1979.
