= Graham County Courthouse (North Carolina) =

- U.S. National Register of Historic Places
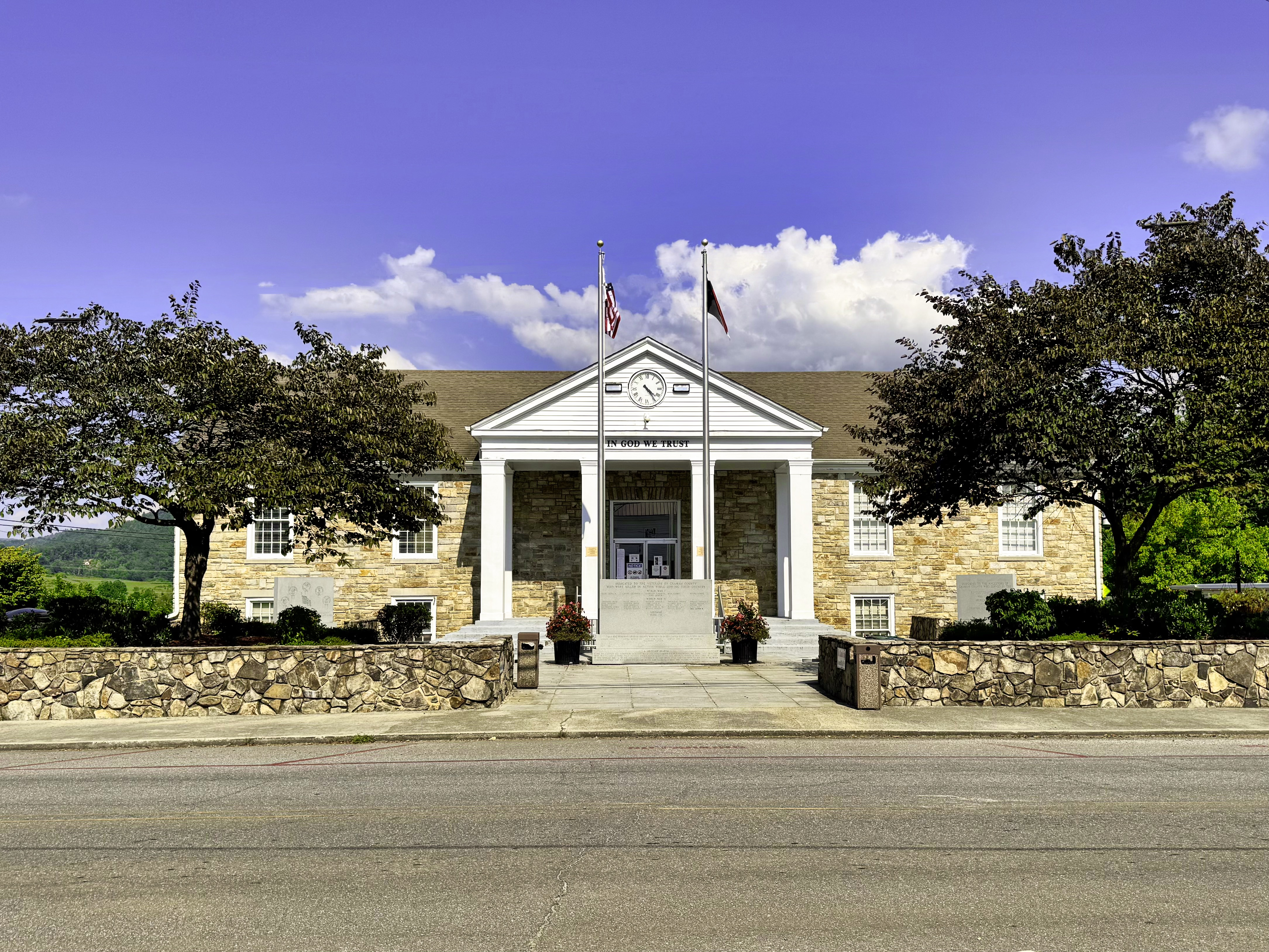

- Location within North Carolina Location within the United States
- Location: 12 N. Main St., Robbinsville, North Carolina
- Coordinates: 35°19′21″N 83°48′25″W
- Area: 0.7 acres (0.28 ha)
- Built: 1942
- Architect: Barber & McMurry
- Architectural style: Classical Revival
- NRHP reference No.: 07000883
- Added to NRHP: August 28, 2007

The Graham County Courthouse is located at 12 North Main Street in Robbinsville, the county seat of Graham County, North Carolina. The T-shaped building occupies a prominent location in the center of Robbinsville. It was listed on the National Register of Historic Places in 2007.

== History ==
The first Graham County Courthouse was constructed in Robbinsville in 1874, but its floor collapsed two decades later while the building was packed during a murder trial. A replacement, built in 1895, was the last wooden courthouse built in North Carolina. The third and current building was completed in 1942.

The current courthouse is a Classical Revival structure designed by Barber and McMurry of Knoxville, Tennessee. It is fashioned from stone reportedly gathered in the Mill Creek area about 2 miles (3.2 km) southeast of Robbinsville. The building is one of three North Carolina courthouses built with funds from the Depression-era Works Progress Administration.

== See also ==
- National Register of Historic Places listings in Graham County, North Carolina
- List of county courthouses in North Carolina
