= Randolph County Courthouse (North Carolina) =

Historic courthouse in North Carolina, US

- U.S. National Register of Historic Places
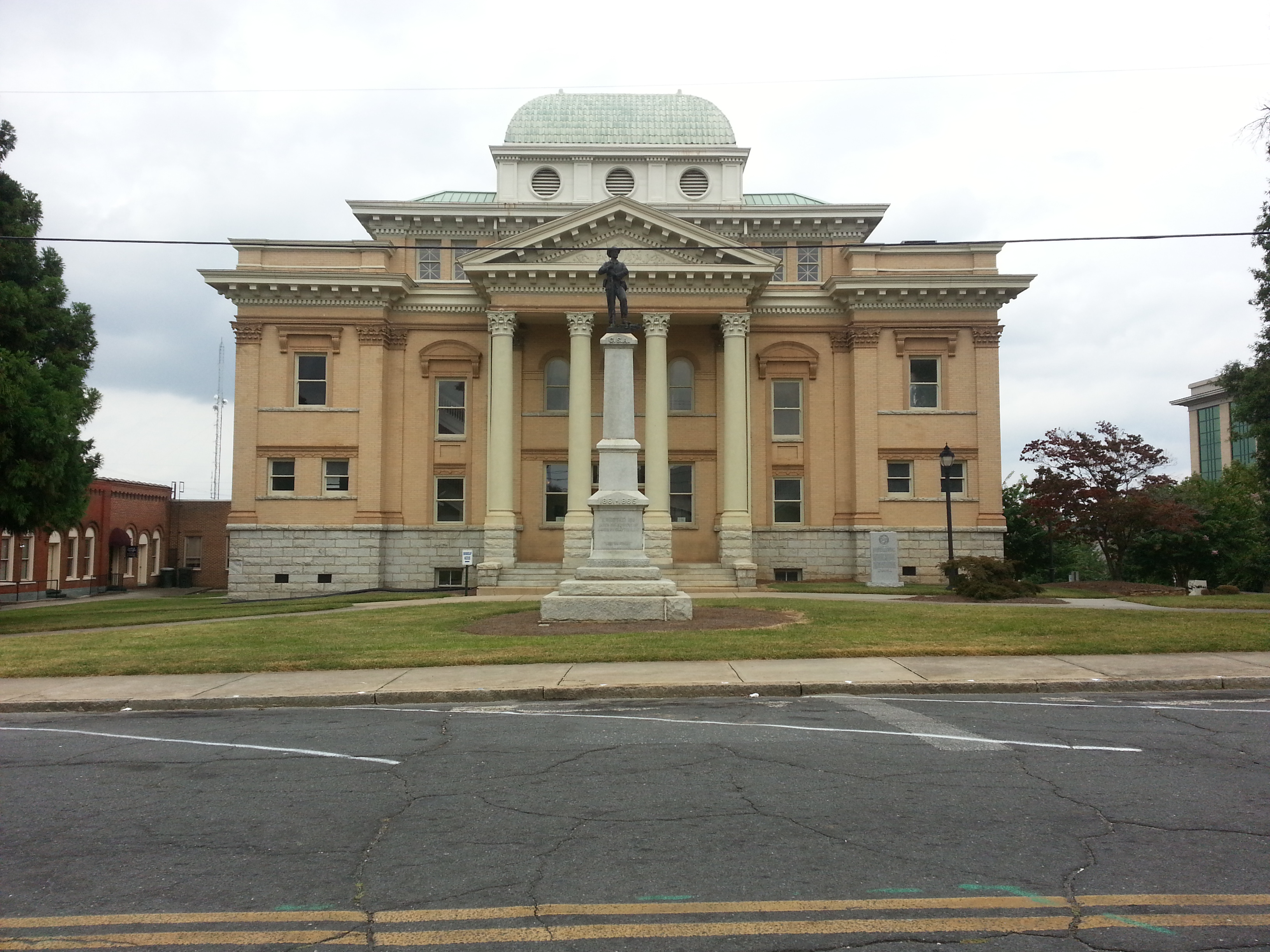
- Courthouse and Confederate statue

- Location within North Carolina Location within the United States
- Location: Worth St., Asheboro, North Carolina
- Coordinates: 35°42′22″N 79°48′48″W
- Area: 3.1 acres (1.3 ha)
- Built: 1908-1909
- Architect: Wheeler, Runge & Dickey; Owen, J.P.
- Architectural style: Classical Revival
- MPS: North Carolina County Courthouses TR
- NRHP reference No.: 79001746
- Added to NRHP: May 10, 1979

The Randolph County Courthouse is a historic courthouse located at Asheboro, Randolph County, North Carolina. It was designed by Wheeler, Runge & Dickey and built in 1908–1909. It is a three-story, Classical Revival-style yellow brick building with a hipped roof. It features a powerful Second Empire dome clad in ribbed tile and front portico. The listing included three contributing buildings on 3.1 acres (1.3 ha). The two other contributing buildings are an early-20th century jail and late Victorian brick building containing law offices.

It was listed on the National Register of Historic Places in 1979.
