= Halifax County Courthouse (North Carolina) =

Historic courthouse North Carolina, US

- U.S. National Register of Historic Places
- U.S. Historic district – Contributing property
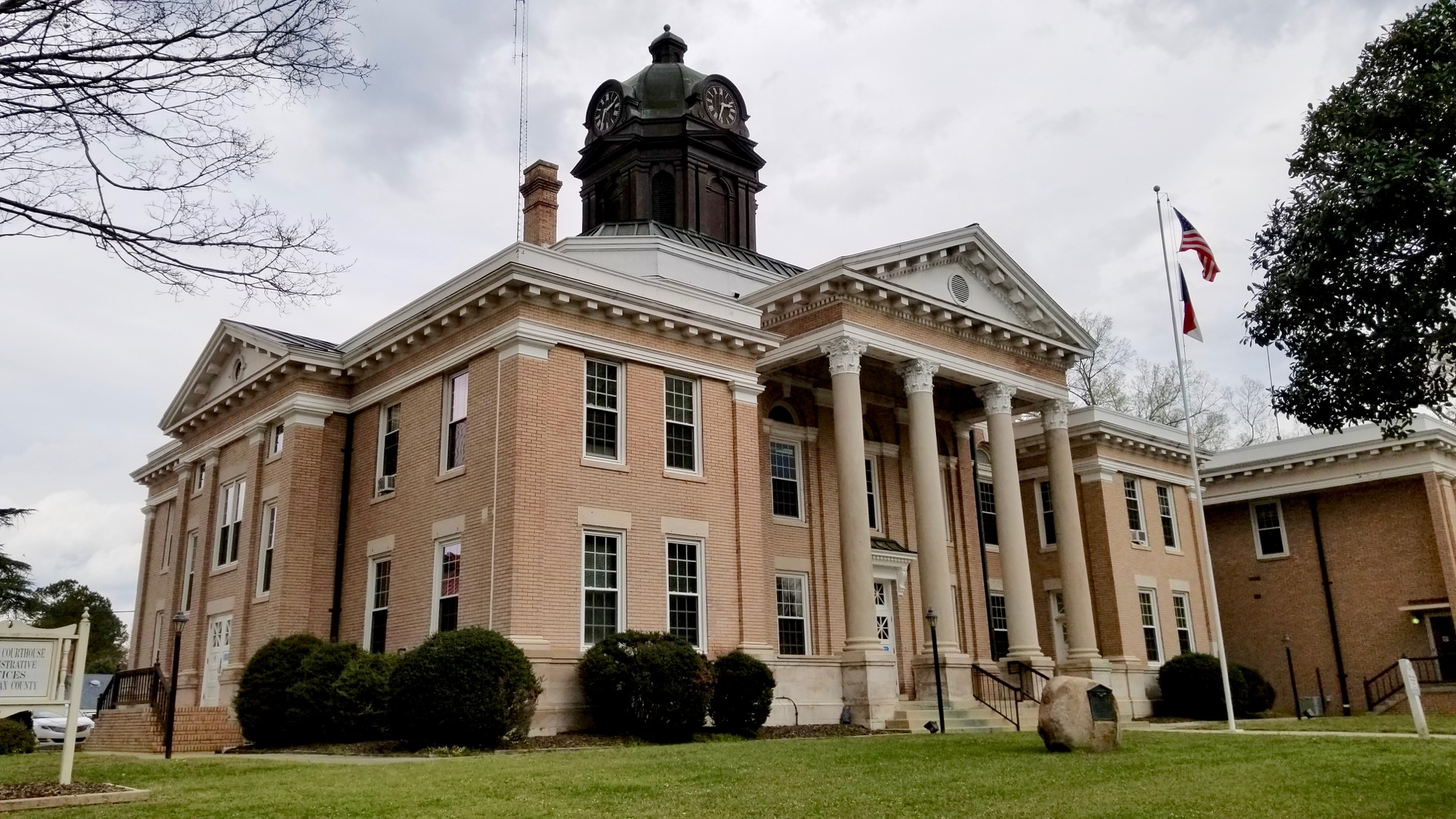

- Location within North Carolina Location within the United States
- Interactive map showing the location of Halifax County Courthouse
- Location: 44 King Street, Halifax, North Carolina
- Coordinates: 36°19′51″N 77°35′22″W
- Built: 1850
- Architect: Wheeler & Stern
- Architectural style: Classical Revival, Late Victorian
- MPS: North Carolina County Courthouses TR
- NRHP reference No.: 79001719
- Added to NRHP: May 10, 1979

Halifax County Courthouse is a historic county courthouse located at Halifax, Halifax County, North Carolina. It was designed by architects Wheeler & Stern and built in 1909–1910. It is a three-story, tan brick, Classical Revival-style building. It has a tetrastyle Corinthian order portico flanked by two-story flat roofed wings and a two-stage cupola atop a shallow mansard roof.

The first Halifax county courthouse was built in 1759. In 1847, the first courthouse was replaced by a second, which itself was replaced in 1910 by a third courthouse erected on the site of the second courthouse. The 1910 courthouse was the present courthouse in 1938, the same year the famed 1938 photo of the drinking fountain on the county courthouse lawn was taken. A stone marker currently stands on the courthouse lawn where the photographed drinking fountain resided.

It was listed on the National Register of Historic Places in 1979.

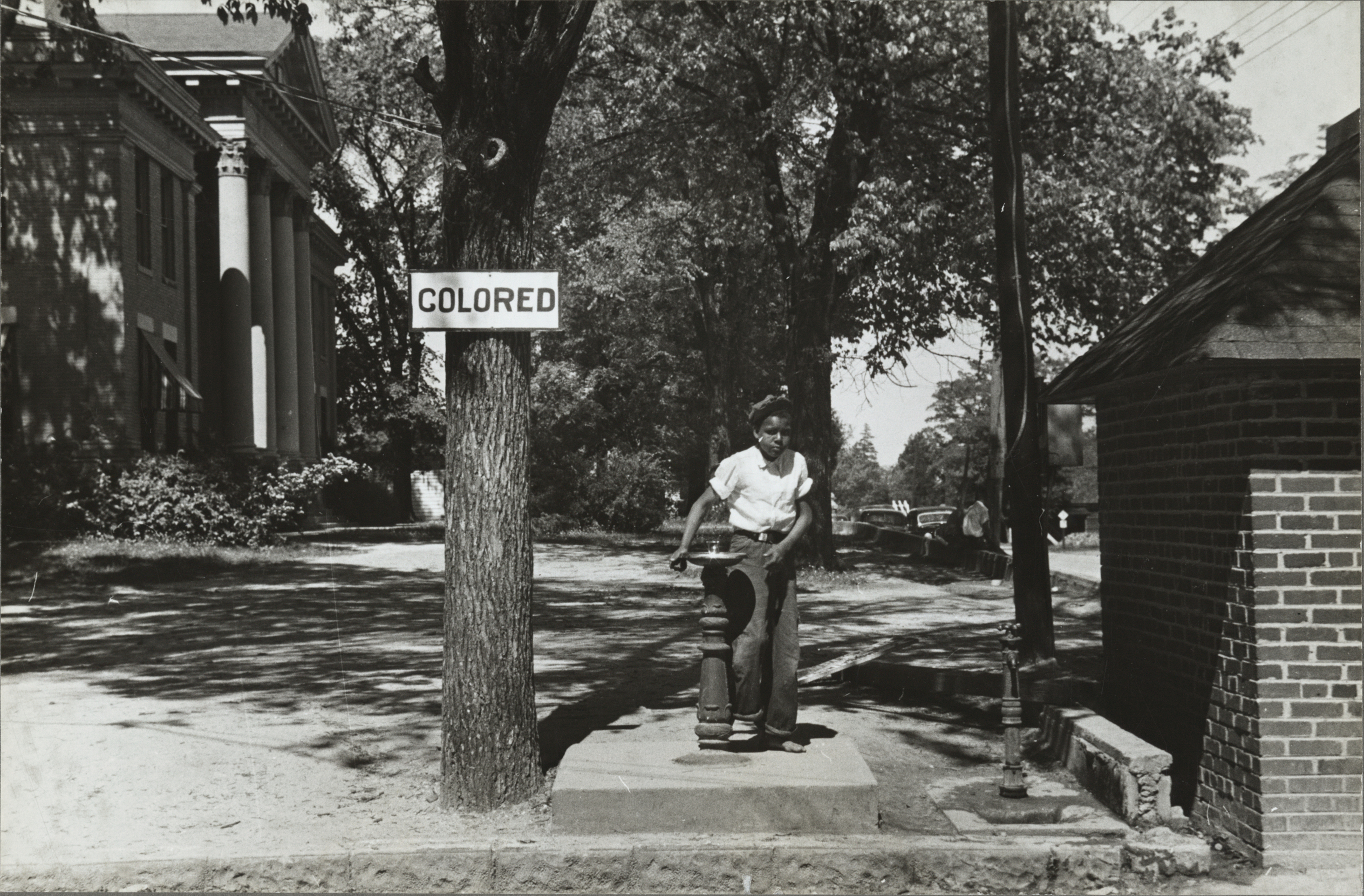
Drinking fountain on the Halifax County Courthouse lawn, April 1938 (Farm Security Administration photograph by John Vachon)
