= Newland, North Carolina =

- Town
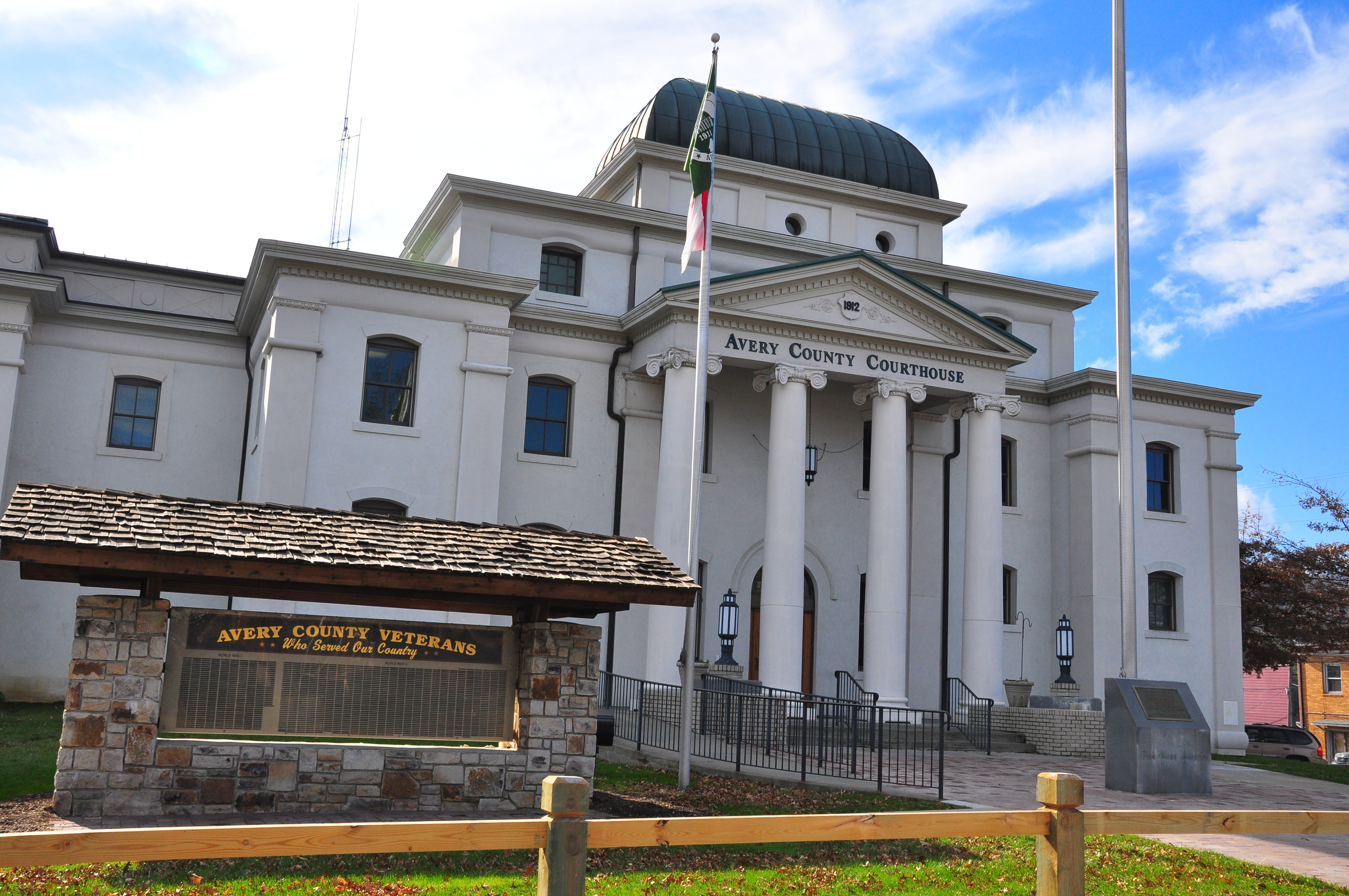
- Avery County Courthouse

- Seal

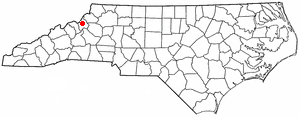
- Location of Newland, North Carolina
- Coordinates: 36°05′17″N 81°55′38″W
- Country: United States
- State: North Carolina
- County: Avery
- Founded: 1911
- Incorporated: 1913
- Named for: William C. Newland

Government
  - Type: Mayor-council
  - Mayor: Derek A. Roberts

Area
  - Total: 0.75 sq mi (1.94 km^{2})
  - Land: 0.75 sq mi (1.94 km^{2})
  - Water: 0 sq mi (0.00 km^{2})
- Elevation: 3,609 ft (1,100 m)

Population (2020)
  - Total: 715
  - Density: 956/sq mi (369.2/km^{2})
- Time zone: UTC-5 (Eastern (EST))
  - Summer (DST): UTC-4 (EDT)
- ZIP code: 28657
- Area code: 828
- FIPS code: 37-46740
- GNIS feature ID: 2406987
- Website: www.townofnewland.org

Newland is a town in and the county seat of Avery County, North Carolina, United States. The population was 715 at the 2020 census. By elevation, Newland is the highest county seat located east of the Mississippi River.

== History ==
Before its founding, the area was known as "Old Fields of Toe". It was an early muster ground in the campaign against Indians and before the Battle of Kings Mountain. On November 9, 1783, the land was granted to Colonel Waightstill Avery.

The name comes from the legend of Estatoe (pronounced 'S - ta - toe'), one of a genre of folktales about a daughter of a native tribal chief who fell in love with a warrior of a rival tribe. Because their love could never be accepted by either family, they jumped from a precipice into the depths of a nearby river. In an alternative version, their love caused a bloody war between the tribes and Estatoe crafted a peace pipe with two stems in which both chiefs could smoke at once. The two rival chiefs assembled their respective followers on the bank of the river, and smoked till peace was concluded and Estatoe married her lover.

In 1899, the Linville River Railway (LRR) began rail service in the area, with a flag stop at "Old Fields". In 1911, upon the establishment of Avery County, Old Fields of Toe was designated as the site for the county seat and was renamed Newland, after the North Carolina Lieutenant Governor William C. Newland. In 1912, the Newland Post Office was established; while in 1913, the Avery County Courthouse and Avery County Jail opened (both in the National Register of Historic Places). In that same year, Newland was incorporated as a town. In 1914, the East Tennessee and Western North Carolina Railroad (ET&WNC), successor of the LRR, opened the Newland Depot, which was equipped with telephone and telegraph services; burned down in 1921, but was soon rebuilt and continued operations till 1940.

== Geography ==
According to the United States Census Bureau, the town has a total area of 0.7 square miles (1.8 km^{2}), all land.

The East Tennessee and Western North Carolina Railroad ("Tweetsie") passed through the town until 1940.

== Demographics ==
Historical population
Census	Pop.	Note	%±
1920	289		—
1930	328		13.5%
1940	471		43.6%
1950	425		−9.8%
1960	564		32.7%
1970	524		−7.1%
1980	722		37.8%
1990	645		−10.7%
2000	704		9.1%
2010	698		−0.9%
2020	715		2.4%
U.S. Decennial Census

=== 2020 census ===
Newland racial composition
Race	Number	Percentage
White (non-Hispanic)	560	78.32%
Black or African American (non-Hispanic)	14	1.96%
Native American	9	1.26%
Asian	4	0.56%
Other/Mixed	36	5.03%
Hispanic or Latino	92	12.87%

As of the 2020 United States census, there were 715 people, 388 households, and 178 families residing in the town.

=== 2000 census ===
As of the census of 2000, there were 704 people, 334 households, and 207 families residing in the town. The population density was 1,044.4 inhabitants per square mile (403.2/km^{2}). There were 363 housing units at an average density of 538.5 units per square mile (207.9 units/km^{2}). The racial makeup of the town was 99.01% White, 0.99% from other races. Hispanic or Latino of any race were 1.56% of the population.

There were 334 households, out of which 25.7% had children under the age of 18 living with them, 42.5% were married couples living together, 15.9% had a female householder with no husband present, and 38.0% were non-families. 34.7% of all households were made up of individuals, and 17.7% had someone living alone who was 65 years of age or older. The average household size was 2.09 and the average family size was 2.63.

In the town, the population was spread out, with 20.3% under the age of 18, 9.9% from 18 to 24, 26.7% from 25 to 44, 22.9% from 45 to 64, and 20.2% who were 65 years of age or older. The median age was 40 years. For every 100 females, there were 89.2 males. For every 100 females age 18 and over, there were 84.5 males.

The median income for a household in the town was $24,375, and the median income for a family was $33,875. Males had a median income of $22,917 versus $24,500 for females. The per capita income for the town was $18,344. About 16.3% of families and 21.2% of the population were below the poverty line, including 21.8% of those under age 18 and 21.3% of those age 65 or over.

== Notable people ==
- Paul Johnson, former head football coach at Georgia Southern, Navy, and Georgia Tech, member of the College Football Hall of Fame
- Joyce McKinney, became notorious for the alleged kidnap and rape of Mormon missionary Kirk Anderson in England in 1977, and hit the news again in 2008 for cloning her pit bull terrier in South Korea

== See also ==
- East Tennessee and Western North Carolina Railroad
- North Toe River
- Spanish Oak Mountain
