= National Register of Historic Places listings in Alleghany County, North Carolina =

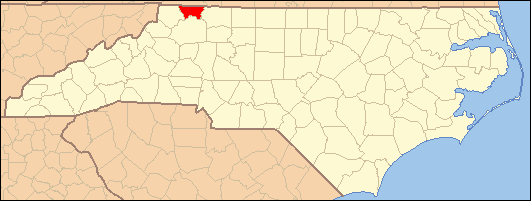

This list includes properties and districts listed on the National Register of Historic Places in Alleghany County, North Carolina. Click the "Map of all coordinates" link to the right to view an online map of all properties and districts with latitude and longitude coordinates in the table below.

This National Park Service list is complete through NPS recent listings posted August 28, 2026.

== Current listings ==
	Name on the Register	Image	Date listed	Location	City or town	Description
1	Alleghany County Courthouse	Alleghany County Courthouse	May 10, 1979 (#79001657)	Main and Whitehead Sts. 36°30′21″N 81°07′15″W	Sparta	
2	Blue Ridge Parkway	Blue Ridge Parkway	December 13, 2024 (#100011353)	Blue Ridge Parkway through Virginia and North Carolina; 36°26′03″N 81°03′48″W	Sparta vicinity	
3	Brinegar Cabin	Brinegar Cabin	January 20, 1972 (#72000922)	At miles 238.5, Blue Ridge Parkway; 36°25′06″N 81°08′44″W	Whitehead	
4	Elbert Crouse Farmstead	Elbert Crouse Farmstead	July 29, 1982 (#82003423)	S of Whitehead on Blue Ridge Parkway; 36°25′50″N 81°08′56″W	Whitehead	
5	Robert L. Doughton House	Robert L. Doughton House	August 13, 1979 (#79001656)	NC 18; 36°24′38″N 81°15′55″W	Laurel Springs	
6	Downtown Sparta Historic District	Downtown Sparta Historic District	December 10, 2021 (#100007244)	First blocks of North and South Main, and East and West Whitehead Streets; 36°30′19″N 81°07′15″W	Sparta	
7	J.C. Gambill Site		April 3, 1978 (#78001927)	Address Restricted	New Haven	
8	Bays Hash Site		April 19, 1978 (#78003078)	Address Restricted	Amelia	
9	Jarvis House		October 16, 1991 (#91001506)	N end NC 1439, N of jct. with NC 18; 36°33′34″N 81°00′43″W	Sparta	
10	Rock House		August 11, 2004 (#04000827)	7 Chestnut Ln. 36°24′47″N 80°57′46″W	Roaring Gap	
11	William T. Vogler Cottage		September 30, 1991 (#91001492)	NC 1478 E side, approx. 1.3 miles NE of US 21; 36°24′09″N 80°58′05″W	Roaring Gap	Destroyed
12	William Weaver House	William Weaver House	November 7, 1976 (#76001297)	SW of Piney Creek on SR 1302; 36°30′13″N 81°19′29″W	Piney Creek	

== See also ==
- National Register of Historic Places listings in North Carolina
- List of National Historic Landmarks in North Carolina
