= USS LST-26 =

American tank landing ship

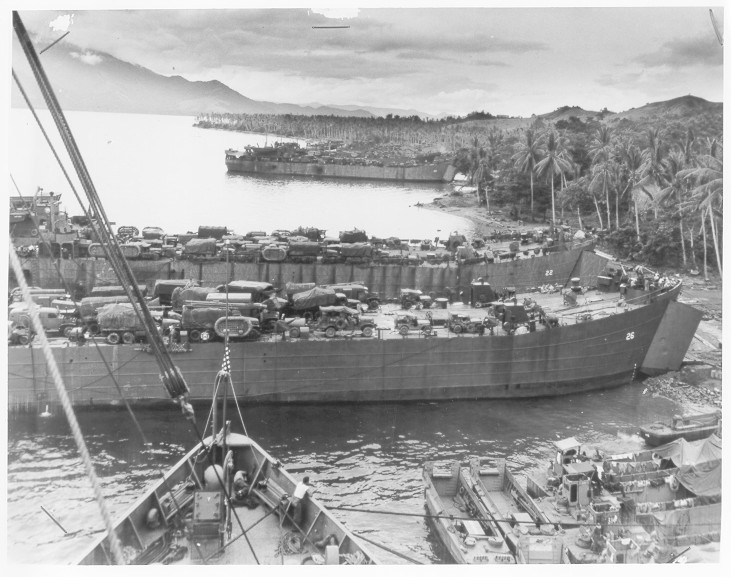
- USS LST-26 unloading on the beach at Tanah Merah Bay, Hollandia, Dutch East Indies, c. April–May 1944. LST-22 is the LST alongside USS LST-26. The LST in the far distance is unidentified.

History

United States
- Name: LST-26
- Builder: Dravo Corporation, Pittsburgh, Pennsylvania
- Laid down: 16 November 1942
- Launched: 31 March 1943
- Sponsored by: Mrs. Mathilda B. Coulter
- Commissioned: 7 June 1943
- Decommissioned: 1 April 1946
- Stricken: 8 May 1946
- Identification: Hull symbol: LST-26; Code letters: NDOW
- Honors and awards: 5 × battle stars
- Fate: Sold for commercial service, 17 June 1946

General characteristics
- Type: LST-1-class tank landing ship
- Displacement: 4,080 long tons (4,145 t) full load; 2,160 long tons (2,190 t) landing
- Length: 328 ft (100 m) oa
- Beam: 50 ft (15 m)
- Draft: Full load: 8 ft 2 in (2.49 m) forward; 14 ft 1 in (4.29 m) aft; Landing at 2,160 t: 3 ft 11 in (1.19 m) forward; 9 ft 10 in (3.00 m) aft
- Installed power: 2 × 900 hp (670 kW) Electro-Motive Diesel 12-567A diesel engines; 1,700 shp (1,300 kW)
- Propulsion: 1 × Falk main reduction gears; 2 × Propellers
- Speed: 12 kn (22 km/h; 14 mph)
- Range: 24,000 nmi (44,000 km; 28,000 mi) at 9 kn (17 km/h; 10 mph) while displacing 3,960 long tons (4,024 t)
- Boats & landing craft carried: 2 or 6 x LCVPs
- Capacity: 2,100 tons oceangoing maximum; 350 tons main deckload
- Troops: 16 officers, 147 enlisted men
- Complement: 13 officers, 104 enlisted men
- Armament: Varied, ultimate armament; 2 × twin 40 mm (1.57 in) Bofors guns; 4 × single 40 mm Bofors guns; 12 × 20 mm (0.79 in) Oerlikon cannons

Service record
- Part of: LST Flotilla 7
- Operations: Cape Gloucester landings, New Britain (26–28, 30 December 1943 and 3, 5–9, and 11–14 January 1944); Aitape Humboldt Bay-Tanahmerah Bay (21–27 April and 1–7 May 1944); Toem-Wakde-Sarmi area (17–21 and 23–25 May 1944); Biak Island (27–30 May and 3–7 and 9–11 June 1944); Noemfoor Island (6–10 July 1944); Cape Sansapor (30 July and 2 and 4–10 August 1944); Morotai landings (15 September 1944); Leyte landings (13–27 October and 5–18 November 1944); Mindanao Island landings (10–11 March 1945)
- Awards: China Service Medal; American Campaign Medal; Asiatic–Pacific Campaign Medal; World War II Victory Medal; Navy Occupation Service Medal w/Asia Clasp; Philippine Republic Presidential Unit Citation; Philippine Liberation Medal

USS LST-26 was a United States Navy LST-1-class tank landing ship used in the Asiatic-Pacific Theater during World War II and crewed by United States Coast Guard sailors. Like many of her class, she was not named and is properly referred to by her hull designation.

== Construction ==
LST-26 was laid down on 16 November 1942, at Pittsburgh, Pennsylvania, by the Dravo Corporation; launched on 31 March 1943; sponsored by Mrs. Mathilda B. Coulter; and commissioned on 7 June 1943.

== Service history ==
LST-26 sailed from Galveston, Texas, on 24 July 1943, with Convoy HK 111 heading for Key West, Florida, where she arrived on 28 July.

Proceeding to the Pacific, LST-26 was at Townsville, Australia, on 29 October 1943. LST-26 participated in the Cape Gloucester landings, New Britain at the end of December 1943 and January 1944.

LST-26 remained busy participating in the Aitape, Humboldt Bay-Tanahmerah Bay invasions at the end of April and the beginning of May 1944, the Toem-Wakde-Sarmi area operations in the middle of May 1944, the Biak Island invasion at the end of May to the middle of June 1944, the Noemfoor Island invasion at the beginning of July 1944, the Cape Sansapor landings at the end of July and the beginning of August 1944, and the Morotai landings in the middle of September 1944.

From the Western New Guinea area LST-26 moved to the Philippines to participate in General Douglas MacArthur's promised liberation of the islands from the Japanese occupation starting with the Leyte landings from the middle of October until the middle of November 1944, and the Mindanao Island landings in March 1945. She left Leyte on 3 April 1945, for Manila and after proceeding to Subic Bay returned to Leyte on 2 May 1945. Departing Leyte on 8 August 1945, she proceeded to Manus, Torokina and Hollandia.

== Postwar career ==
Following the war, LST-26 performed occupation duty in the Far East until early November 1945. Leaving Hollandia on 29 August 1945, she arrived at Zamboanga, Mindanao on 3 September 1945. From there she went to Okinawa and returned to San Francisco, via Leyte and Pearl Harbor, arriving at San Francisco on 6 December 1945. She returned to the United States and was decommissioned on 1 April 1946. She was struck from the Navy list on 8 May 1946, and was sold to Arctic Circle Exploration, Seattle, Washington, on 17 June 1946, for conversion to merchant service.

== Awards ==
LST-26 earned five battle stars for her World War II service.

== Bibliography ==
- "LST-26". Dictionary of American Naval Fighting Ships. Naval History and Heritage Command. 4 August 2015. This article incorporates text from this source, which is in the public domain.
- "USS LST-26". NavSource. 4 April 2014.
- "Convoy HK.111". Arnold Hague Convoy Database.
- "USS LST-26" (PDF). United States Coast Guard. This article incorporates text from this source, which is in the public domain.
