= Leo H. Irwin =

American judge (1917–1995)

Judge of the United States Tax Court
- In office 1968–1983
- Appointed by: Lyndon B. Johnson; Richard Nixon
- Preceded by: Russell E. Train
- Succeeded by: Stephen Swift

Personal details
- Born: Leo Howard Irwin; August 1, 1917 Sparta, North Carolina, U.S.
- Died: September 16, 1995 (aged 78) Whitehead Township, Alleghany County, North Carolina, U.S.
- Spouse: Doris
- Parent(s): Carl Irwin; Mallie Irwin
- Education: George Washington University (AB); Georgetown University Law Center (LLB)
- Profession: Judge

Military service
- Allegiance: United States
- Branch/service: United States Navy
- Battles/wars: World War II

Leo Howard Irwin (August 1, 1917 – September 16, 1995) was a judge of the United States Tax Court.

Born in Sparta, North Carolina to Carl and Mallie Irwin, Irwin attended the public schools of Sparta, and enrolled at the University of North Carolina from 1935 to 1938, but did not finish a course of study there. Instead, in 1938, he began working as a messenger for the United States Department of Agriculture and the Civil Service Commission, and that same year began attending the George Washington University in the evening, to receive an A.B. in 1940. He continued working for the government while becoming a night student at the Georgetown University Law Center in 1940, but left that program in 1942 to serve in the United States Navy, during World War II. He entered the military service as a naval communications officer, serving on the staff of the commander of the Amphibious Training Command for the Atlantic Fleet, and later as staff communications officer and flag secretary for the USS LST-22 Flotilla in the Pacific. Returning to civilian life in 1946, Irwin worked for the United States Department of the Treasury, and for the Civil Aeronautics Board, and continued as a night student at Georgetown, receiving his LL.B. in 1947.

In 1949, Congressman Robert Doughton, Chairman of the House Ways and Means Committee hired Irwin on his staff, leading to Irwin eventually serving for nineteen years as Chief Counsel for that committee. While serving in that capacity, Irwin met his wife, Doris, who was on the committee. From 1962 to 1963, Irwin returned to the Georgetown University Law Center, this time as an adjunct professor.

In 1968, President Lyndon B. Johnson appointed Irwin to a seat on the United States Tax Court vacated by the resignation of Russell E. Train. Irwin served the remainder of Train's term, and was then reappointed to full term by President Richard Nixon in 1970. On the court, Irwin "wrote 462 opinions, including four concurrences and seven dissents". Irwin's most noted opinion on that court was one allowing country singer Conway Twitty to deduct the cost of repaying friends for their losses incurred while investing in Twitty's failed effort to start a restaurant chain. Irwin concluded the opinion with several lines of rhyme about the case. Irwin served until his resignation in 1983, with President Ronald Reagan nominating Stephen Swift to replace him.

Irwin died in September 1995, at his summer home in Whitehead, North Carolina, and was memorialized in a special session of the Tax Court on December 1, 1995.
