= Judge Irwin =

Judge Irwin may refer to:

- Leo H. Irwin (1917–1995), judge of the United States Tax Court
- Stephen Irwin (judge) (born 1953), British Lord Justice of Appeal
- Thomas Irwin (American politician) (1785–1870), judge of the United States District Court for the Western District of Pennsylvania
