= Temple of Juno Caelestis (Dougga) =

Archeological site in Dougga, Tunisia

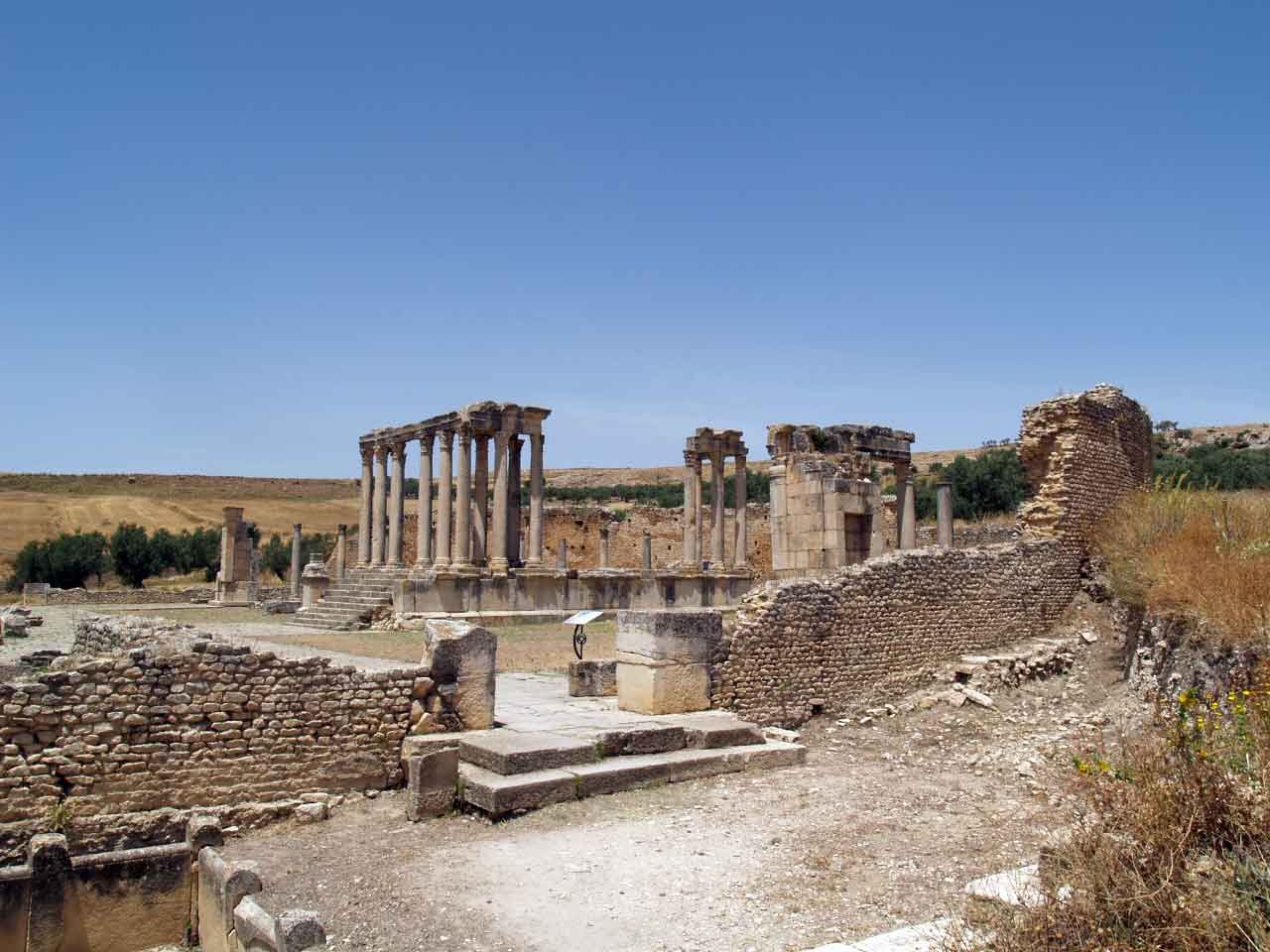
- Interactive map of Temple of Juno Caelestis
- 36°25′22″N 9°12′56″E
- Type: Temple
- Location: Dougga, Tunisia

History
- Built by: Roman Empire

Site notes
- Material: Stone

The Temple of Juno Caelestis is an archaeological site in Dougga, Tunisia. The ruined temple was dedicated to the Roman goddess Juno, herself an evolution of the Punic goddess Tanit. The temple was built between AD 222 and 235, and is one of the best preserved temples dedicated to Juno in Africa.

== Description ==
The temple was built between AD 222 and 235 during the reign of Severus Alexander. The temple was dedicated to the Roman goddess Juno, whom the residents of Dougga widely associated with the Punic goddess Tanit. As opposed to other archaeological sites at Dougga, the Temple was built on the outer edges of the city. The temple's tenemos is shaped like a crescent, a traditional symbol of Juno.

The temple was first excavated in the 1890s, and restoration work on the temple began in 1904. Renewed interest in Dougga's archaeological sites resulted in the temple being examined 1999 and 2002.
