= Elbert Crouse Farmstead =

Historic farm in North Carolina, United States

- U.S. National Register of Historic Places
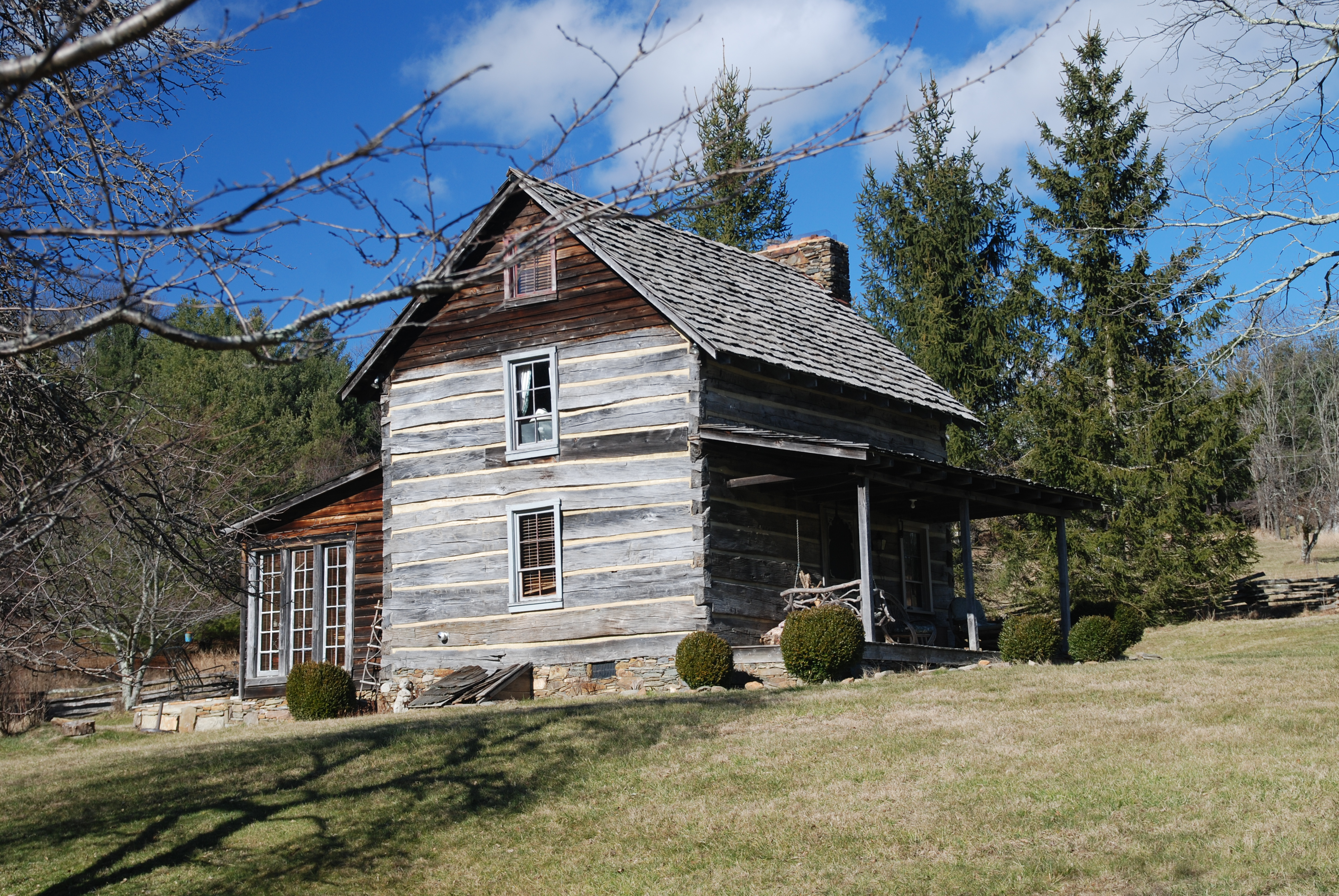

- Location within North Carolina Location within the United States
- Location: S of Whitehead on Blue Ridge Parkway, Whitehead, North Carolina
- Coordinates: 36°25′41″N 81°9′4″W
- Area: 139 acres (56 ha)
- NRHP reference No.: 82003423
- Added to NRHP: July 29, 1982

Elbert Crouse Farmstead is a historic home and farm located near Whitehead, Alleghany County, North Carolina. The farmhouse was built about 1905, and is a small log dwelling with a traditional two-room plan and an attic under a steeply pitched gable roof. Also on the property is a contributing frame barn, dated to the 1920s or 1930s, a small shed storage building with vertical board siding, a latticed gable roof structure that was originally a grave cover, a concrete block silo, the ruins of a small frame outbuilding, and the family cemetery. The Elbert Crouse Farmstead is representative of the small subsistence family farms in Western North Carolina.

It was listed on the National Register of Historic Places in 1982.
