= Stephen Swift (judge) =

American judge (born 1943)

Steve Swift

Senior Judge of the United States Tax Court
- In office September 8, 2008 – January 1, 2016
- In office August 15, 1998 – December 1, 2000

Judge of the United States Tax Court
- In office December 1, 2000 – September 8, 2008
- Appointed by: Bill Clinton
- Preceded by: Himself
- Succeeded by: Albert G. Lauber
- In office August 16, 1983 – August 15, 1998
- Appointed by: Ronald Reagan
- Preceded by: Leo H. Irwin
- Succeeded by: Himself

Personal details
- Born: Stephen Jensen Swift; September 7, 1943 (age 82) Utah, U.S.
- Education: Brigham Young University (BS); George Washington University (JD)

Stephen Jensen Swift (born September 7, 1943 in Utah) is a former judge of the United States Tax Court. Swift graduated from Menlo Atherton High School, in Atherton, California in 1961. He received his Bachelor of Science from Brigham Young University in Political Science in 1967 and his Juris Doctor from The George Washington University Law School in 1970.

Swift was appointed by President Ronald Reagan as Judge, United States Tax Court, on August 16, 1983, for a term ending August 15, 1998. He thereafter served as Senior Judge on recall performing judicial duties until reappointed by President Bill Clinton on December 1, 2000, for a term ending November 30, 2015. Swift resumed senior status on September 8, 2008, and retired on January 1, 2016.

== Employment ==
- Attorney, United States Department of Justice Tax Division, 1970–74
- Assistant U.S. Attorney, Tax Division, U.S. Attorney's Office, San Francisco, California, 1974–77
- Vice President and Senior Tax Counsel, Tax Department, Bank of America N.T. and S.A., San Francisco, California, 1977–83
- Adjunct professor, Graduate Tax Programs, Golden Gate University, San Francisco, California, 1978–83; University of Baltimore, 1987 to present
- Member of State Bar of California, District of Columbia Bar, and American Bar Association, Section of Taxation.

Legal offices
Preceded by Leo H. Irwin	Judge of the United States Tax Court; 1983–1998	Succeeded by Himself
Preceded by Himself	Judge of the United States Tax Court; 2000–2008	Succeeded by Albert G. Lauber
