= Brinegar Cabin =

Historic house in North Carolina, United States

- U.S. National Register of Historic Places
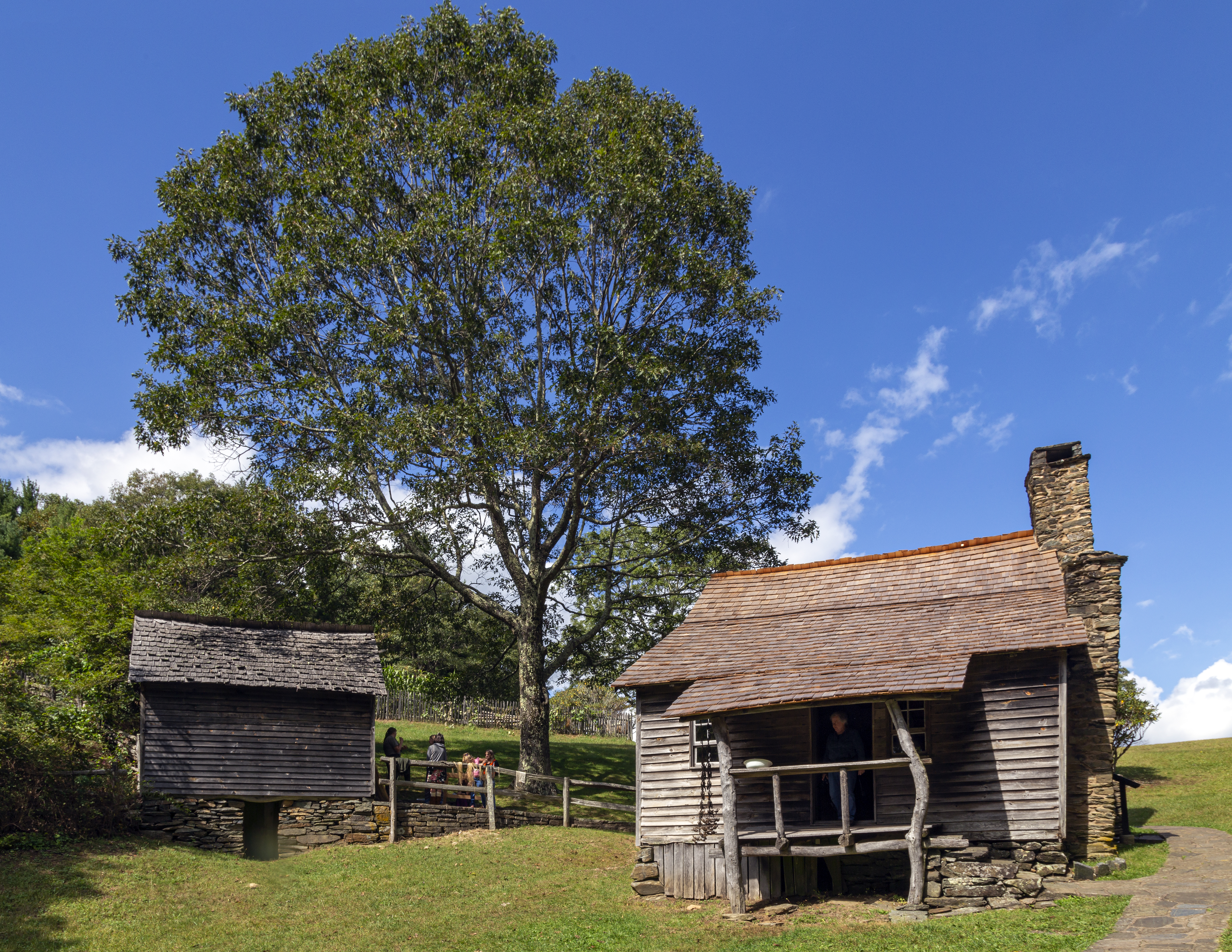
- Brinegar Cabin in 2016

- Location within North Carolina Location within the United States
- Location: At miles 238.5, Blue Ridge Pkwy., near Whitehead, North Carolina
- Coordinates: 36°25′6″N 81°8′44″W
- Area: 0 acres (0 ha)
- Built: 1880
- Built by: Brinegar, Martin
- Architectural style: Log construction
- NRHP reference No.: 72000922
- Added to NRHP: January 20, 1972

Brinegar Cabin is a historic home located near Whitehead, Alleghany County, North Carolina. It was built about 1880, and is a one-story log house covered with lapped siding and resting on an uncoursed fieldstone foundation. Also on the property is a contributing frame outbuilding. The property is part of the lands comprising the Blue Ridge Parkway, and the cabin houses a display of mountain crafts and weaving.

It was listed on the National Register of Historic Places in 1972.
