= Christian N. Weiler =

American judge (born 1979)

Christian Weiler
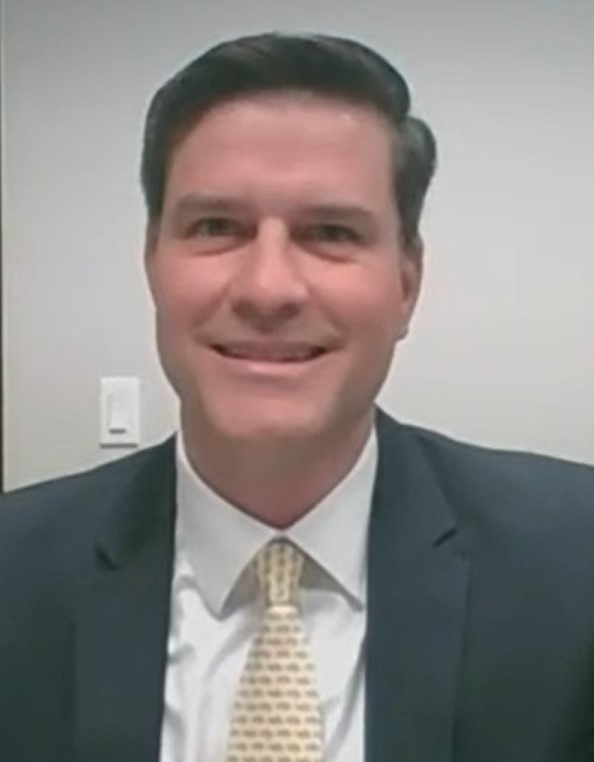
- Weiler in 2020

Judge of the United States Tax Court
- Incumbent
- Assumed office September 9, 2020
- Appointed by: Donald Trump
- Preceded by: Albert G. Lauber

Personal details
- Born: Christian Neumann Weiler; May 1, 1979 (age 46); New Orleans, Louisiana, U.S.
- Education: Louisiana State University (BS); Loyola University New Orleans (JD); Southern Methodist University (LLM)

Christian Neumann Weiler (born May 1, 1979) is an American tax lawyer from Louisiana who serves as a judge of the United States Tax Court.

== Early life and education ==
Weiler was born in New Orleans and raised in Bourg, Louisiana. He earned his Bachelor of Science from Louisiana State University, his Juris Doctor from the Loyola University New Orleans College of Law, and his Master of Laws in Taxation from the Dedman School of Law at Southern Methodist University.

== Career ==
Before becoming a judge, Weiler was a partner at Weiler & Rees in New Orleans, Louisiana, where his practice included all areas of tax law, with an emphasis on tax litigation. Weiler was a board-certified tax law specialist as recognized by the Louisiana Board of Legal Specialization. He also served as an officer with the Tax Section of the Louisiana State Bar Association.

== United States Tax Court service ==
On November 6, 2019, President Donald Trump announced his intent to nominate Weiler to serve as a judge of the United States Tax Court for a term of fifteen years. On November 19, 2019, his nomination was sent to the Senate. President Trump nominated Weiler to the seat vacated by Judge Albert G. Lauber, who assumed senior status on January 1, 2020. On August 13, 2020, the United States Senate confirmed his nomination by voice vote. He was sworn into office on September 9, 2020.

Legal offices
Preceded by Albert G. Lauber	Judge of the United States Tax Court; 2020–present	Incumbent
