= Albert G. Lauber =

American judge (born 1950)

Al Lauber
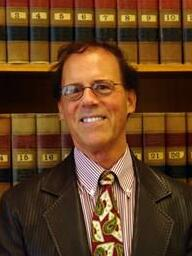

Senior Judge of the United States Tax Court
- Incumbent
- Assumed office January 1, 2020

Judge of the United States Tax Court
- In office January 31, 2013 – January 1, 2020
- Appointed by: Barack Obama
- Preceded by: Stephen Swift
- Succeeded by: Christian N. Weiler

Personal details
- Born: Albert George Lauber; January 1, 1950 (age 76) Bronxville, New York, U.S.
- Education: Yale University (BA, JD); Clare College, Cambridge (MA)

Albert George Lauber (born January 1, 1950) is an American lawyer who serves as a senior judge of the United States Tax Court.

== Biography ==
Lauber was born in Bronxville, New York, on January 1, 1950. He received a Bachelor of Arts (summa cum laude, Phi Beta Kappa, Warren Memorial High Scholarship Prize) in 1971 from Yale College and a Juris Doctor in 1977 from Yale Law School. He received a Master of Arts in 1974, from Clare College, Cambridge. He served as a law clerk to Judge Malcolm R. Wilkey of the United States Court of Appeals for the District of Columbia Circuit and Justice Harry A. Blackmun of the United States Supreme Court. He served in the United States Department of Justice as a tax assistant to the Solicitor General and later served as Deputy Solicitor General from 1983 to 1988. He spent seventeen years as a partner at the Washington, D.C. tax firm of Caplin & Drysdale, where he specialized in tax litigation at the trial and appellate levels. He previously served as Director of the Graduate Tax and Securities Programs and as a Visiting Professor of Law at Georgetown University Law Center.

== Tax Court service ==
On May 26, 2011, President Barack Obama nominated Lauber to serve as a Judge of the United States Tax Court, to the seat vacated by Judge Stephen J. Swift, who had resigned from the court. His nomination received a hearing before the United States Senate Committee on Finance on December 11, 2012 and was reported favorably on December 21, 2012. His nomination was confirmed by the United States Senate on January 1, 2013. He received his commission on January 31, 2013. His commission will expire on January 30, 2028, at which time his fifteen-year term will end.

In August 2018, Lauber determined that Illinois Tool Works owed no tax on over $356 million in repatriated funds from its foreign subsidiaries because the transactions had been sufficiently structured as debt. Lauber also decided two high-profile transfer pricing cases, Amazon v. Commissioner and Coca-Cola v. Commissioner. He assumed senior status on January 1, 2020.

== See also ==
- List of law clerks for the second seat of the Supreme Court of the United States

Legal offices
Preceded by Stephen Swift	Judge of the United States Tax Court; 2013–2020	Succeeded by Christian N. Weiler
