= USS LST-22 =

WWII US tank landing ship

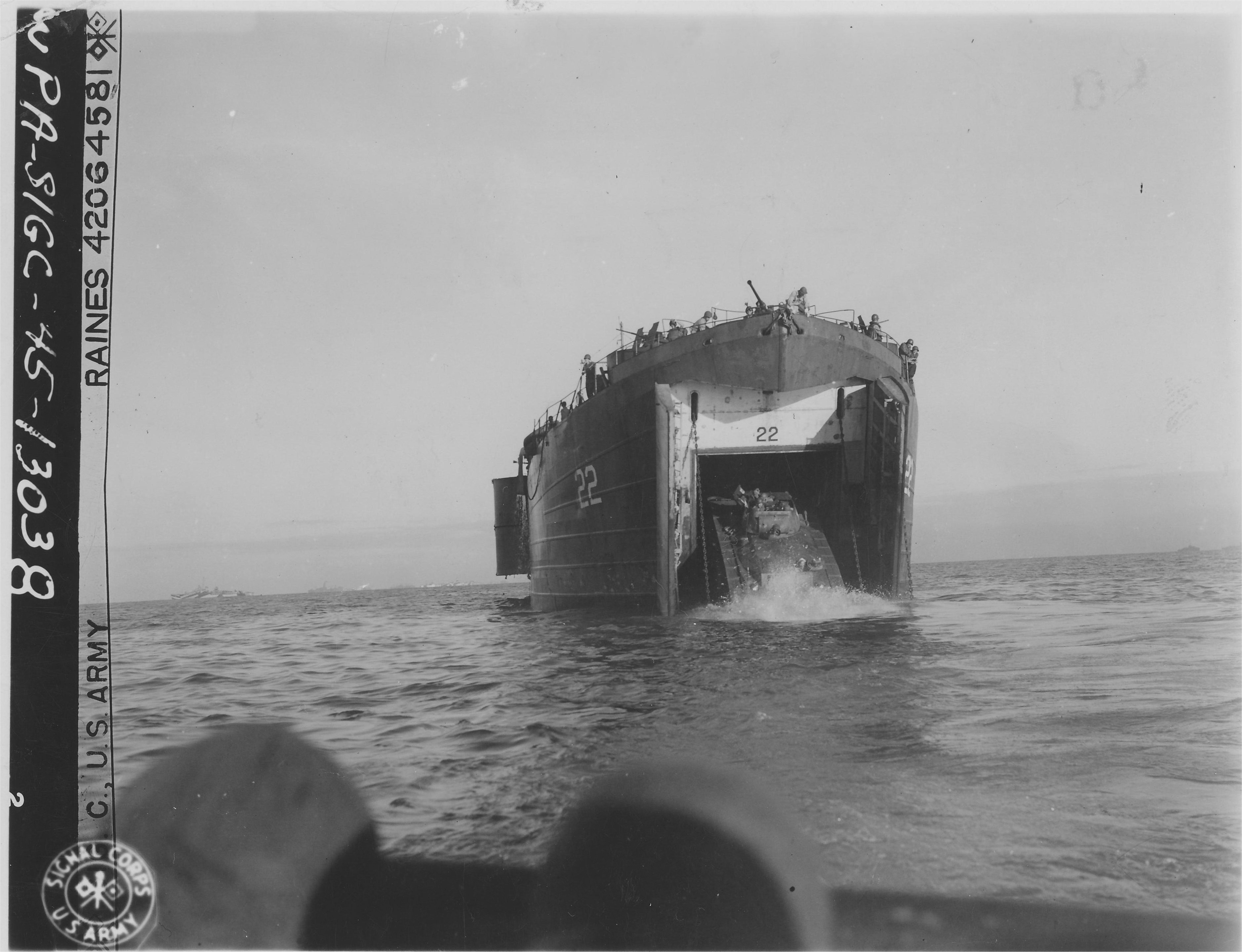
- USS LST-22, unloading her cargo of Alligators and Buffalos, 9 January 1945, at Lingayen Gulf during the invasion of Luzon. Vehicles were under the command of LCOL. Lloyd Barron, CO (3RD BN, 43 INF DIV).

History

United States
- Name: LST-22
- Builder: Dravo Corporation, Pittsburgh, Pennsylvania
- Laid down: 5 November 1942
- Launched: 29 March 1943
- Sponsored by: Mrs. W. A. Barnes
- Commissioned: 29 May 1943
- Decommissioned: 1 April 1946
- Stricken: 17 April 1946
- Identification: Hull symbol: LST-22; Code letters: NXOD
- Honors and awards: 6 × battle stars
- Fate: Sold for conversion to merchant service, 3 February 1947

Republic of China
- Name: Wan Cheng
- Owner: Ming Sung Industrial Co., Ltd., Shanghai, Republic of China
- Acquired: 3 February 1947
- Identification: IMO number: 5072357
- Fate: Unknown

General characteristics
- Type: LST-1-class tank landing ship
- Displacement: 4,080 long tons (4,145 t) full load; 2,160 long tons (2,190 t) landing
- Length: 328 ft (100 m) oa
- Beam: 50 ft (15 m)
- Draft: Full load: 8 ft 2 in (2.49 m) forward; 14 ft 1 in (4.29 m) aft; Landing at 2,160 t: 3 ft 11 in (1.19 m) forward; 9 ft 10 in (3.00 m) aft
- Installed power: 2 × 900 hp (670 kW) Electro-Motive Diesel 12-567A diesel engines; 1,700 shp (1,300 kW)
- Propulsion: 1 × Falk main reduction gears; 2 × Propellers
- Speed: 12 kn (22 km/h; 14 mph)
- Range: 24,000 nmi (44,000 km; 28,000 mi) at 9 kn (17 km/h; 10 mph) while displacing 3,960 long tons (4,024 t)
- Boats & landing craft carried: 2 or 6 x LCVPs
- Capacity: 2,100 tons oceangoing maximum; 350 tons main deckload
- Troops: 16 officers, 147 enlisted men
- Complement: 13 officers, 104 enlisted men
- Armament: Varied, ultimate armament; 2 × twin 40 mm (1.57 in) Bofors guns; 4 × single 40 mm Bofors guns; 12 × 20 mm (0.79 in) Oerlikon cannons

Service record
- Part of: LST Flotilla 7
- Operations: Cape Gloucester landings, New Britain (26–28 December 1943, 15–19 January, 30 January–2 February, 15–19 and 21–23 February 1944); Admiralty Islands landings (29 February–4 March, 7–11 March, and 28 March–10 April 1944); Saidor occupation (2–3, 6–9, 20–22 January, and 4–7 February 1944); Hollandia operation (21–25 April and 1–7 May 1944); Toem-Wakde-Sarmi area (18–20 and 23–25 May 1944); Biak Island (27–30 May, 3–7 and 16 June 1944); Noemfoor Island (10–15 July 1944); Cape Sansapor (30 July and 2, 6–12, 14–19, and 22–28 August 1944); Morotai landings (15 September 1944); Leyte landings (23 October and 4 November 1944); Battle of Luzon Lingayen Gulf landings (4–15 January 1945)
- Awards: American Campaign Medal; Asiatic–Pacific Campaign Medal; World War II Victory Medal; Philippine Republic Presidential Unit Citation; Philippine Liberation Medal

USS LST-22 was a United States Navy LST-1-class tank landing ship used exclusively in the Asiatic-Pacific Theater during World War II and staffed by a United States Coast Guard crew. Like many of her class, she was not named and is properly referred to by her hull designation.

== Construction ==
LST-22 was laid down on 5 November 1942, at Pittsburgh, Pennsylvania, by the Dravo Corporation; launched on 29 March 1943; sponsored by Mrs. W. A. Barnes. She was floated down the Ohio and Mississippi rivers by a Navy ferry crew to the Naval Section Base, Algiers, Louisiana, in May 1943. LST-22 was formally commissioned on 16 June 1943. She then proceeded on her shakedown cruise to Panama City, Florida.

== Service history ==
During the war, LST-22 served exclusively and extensively in the Asiatic-Pacific Theater from September 1943 until November 1945.

LST-22 sailed from Galveston, Texas, on 19 July 1943, with Convoy HK 109 heading for Key West, Florida, where she arrived on 23 July.

LST-22 joined a convoy to Guantánamo Bay, Cuba, and the Panama Canal, toward the end of July 1943, on the first leg of the cruise to the Southwest Pacific. Stopping at Bora Bora, Tutula, Viti Levu and Noumea the LST reached Brisbane, Australia, late in September 1943.

LST-22 participated in the landing at Scarlet Beach during the Battle of Finschhafen from 22 to 24 September 1943.

In November 1943, she sailed from Townsville, Australia to Milne Bay, Oro Bay, Lae, Buna, and back to Milne Bay. Early December saw the LST in Port Moresby, then to Lae, in Task Unit 76.3.6 with RAAF equipment and personnel aboard. At Goodenough Island, a Marine cargo was loaded consisting of combat vehicles and gear of the First Marine Division to be landed at Cape Cretin and on 13 December 1943, LST-22 completed loading Marine Corps personnel and joined Task Force 76.2.2 consisting of two Coast Guard-staffed and five Navy-staffed LSTs with three destroyers and Reserve (W 149) for Cape Gloucester, New Britain.

LST-22 participated in the Cape Gloucester landings, New Britain at the end of December 1943 and January 1944. After beaching at Cape Gloucester on 26 December 1943, the ship underwent its first enemy air raid. Returning to Goodenough Island, another combat load was taken to Saidor, New Guinea, beaching there on 2 January 1944.

The next two months were occupied in resupply echelons. A second trip to Saidor on 8 January 1944, was followed by a second trip to Cape Gloucester on 14 January 1944. On 1 February 1944, a third trip was made to Cape Gloucester. On 4 February, a second trip to Saidor she underwent four "red" alerts during loading operations. On 25 February, she again departed Cape Sudest for Cape Gloucester, returning to Buna Roads to take an LCM in tow on 27 February, for Cape Cretin together with two other LSTs, departing on 29 February, for the Admiralty Islands with the LCM still in tow. She arrived at Hyane Harbor, Los Negros Island, on 2 March 1944, in a support of the Admiralty Islands landings during the initial phase of the operation. While on the assignment the ship came under enemy mortar fire and on orders of the Task Group Commander, opened fire with her 3-inch (76 mm)/50 caliber gun on the mortar fire area. During the afternoon she underwent an enemy attack, no casualties resulting from enemy action but three men being injured from an exploding 20-millimetre (0.79 in) shell which hit the guard rail. Arriving at Cape Sudest on 4 March 1944, the LST commenced loading cargo for a resupply run to Seeadler Harbor on 9 March, and returned to Cape Sudest on 12 March. Trips to Buna Roads, Cape Cretin, Lae, Seeadler Harbor and Buna Roads with cargo consumed the rest of March 1944.

After 14 days at Buna Roads for anchor upkeep and training, LST-22 proceeded to load cargo at Goodenough Island, and departing for Cape Cretin, on 18 April, formed Task Group 77.4 for Tanalmeral Bay, Dutch New Guinea, arriving there 23 April 1944. There they participated in the Hollandia operation on D-day plus one and underwent several 'red' alerts but no enemy action, departing next day for Cape Cretin.

The first half of May 1944 was occupied with runs carrying cargo for Aitape, from Seeadler Harbor, and to Hollandia. On 18 May 1944, the ship was underway for Wakde, Dutch New Guinea, with an LCT in tow, beaching there under enemy fire on 19 May. One man was wounded from enemy fire, and cargo was discharged under sporadic fire from enemy emplacements on the beach. A second trip to Wake was made on 23 May. This was followed by a trip with cargo for the Biak Island invasion on 28 May, after which SC-699 was taken in tow for Hollandia. June was taken up with two more trips to Biak and another to Arare, Wakde Island, where she beached on 6 July 1944. On 9 July, she proceeded to Noemfoor, four days after the surprise landing there on 2 July, and after unloading returned to Humboldt Bay. Trips to Maffin Bay, Cape Sansapor landings and Alexishafen, New Guinea, consumed the rest of July and August 1944.

Following dry docking and overhaul at Alexishafen, preparations were made for the Morotai landings. With echelon of LSTs, LCIs, and LCTs in tow, she departed Hollandia, 11 September 1944, with cargo and personnel discharged at Morotai on 16 September 1944. Just before beaching at Morotai, an enemy plane was fired upon by LST-22 and was thought to be damaged by her guns. Returning to Hollandia, she moved again to Alexishafen, for overhaul and installation of more antiaircraft guns, returning to Hollandia, on 7 October 1944.

From the Western New Guinea area the "Love 6" echelon with destination Leyte, Philippine Islands, was formed and departed Hollandia, on 23 October 1944, to participate in General Douglas MacArthur's promised liberation of the islands from the Japanese occupation. Unloading was carried out 30 October, "D" plus 10 day, following a typhoon which the ship rode out at anchor. Returning to Hollandia, on 5 November 1944, a trip to Milne Bay followed and on 19 December, she departed for Aitape, for practice exercises with elements of the 43rd Infantry.

On 28 December 1944, "George 1" echelon of Task Group 78 was formed with the ultimate destination of Lingayen Gulf, Luzon. Various elements joined until the entire task group was formed before entering the Philippines. Several enemy planes were seen attacking en route but only one came within range and this was destroyed by the fire from several LSTs, with partial credit to the crew of LST-22. One casualty resulted when a strafing bullet from the plane went through the thigh of an Army photographer on board. On 9 January 1945, two hours before "H" hour, LVTs were launched to carry the first assault wave to San Fabian Beach. The ship discharged the balance of her cargo at "H" hour plus one, with the aid of the pontoons carried from Milne Bay. The balance of 9 January, and that night were spent at anchor with occasional air raids. Next day she departed for Leyte, the focal point for future movements replacing Hollandia, and remained there until 22 January 1945. On 27 January, she began a resupply run to Lingayen Gulf, discharging cargo and personnel and departing 8 February for Mindoro Island to take on a load for Leyte Gulf.

From 15 February to 6 March 1945, was spent in the Leyte Gulf area, LST-22 departing for Manila, on 14 March, and returning to Leyte, on 26 March 1945. Two shuttle trips to Manila were made in April. LST-22 left Leyte, on 8 May 1945, with Convoy IG 21, for Hollandia, Dutch East Indies, where she arrive on 14 May 1945. From Hollandia, she went to Madang, New Guinea, to pick up an Australian Tank Company to be transported to Cape Torokina, Bougainville. From there she went to Green Island to load equipment for the Royal New Zealand Air and Ground Forces for Jacquinot Bay, New Britain, and reloaded there with Australian Ground Forces for Wide Bay, New Britain.

From Wide Bay, she proceeded to Manus Island, for availability for cleaning and painting her bottom. Arriving at Subic Bay on 10 July 1945, she unloaded for a limited availability after which she departed for Manila. Here she loaded cargo for Palawan, where she unloaded early in August, 1945, and from there proceeded to Zamboanga City, Mindanao. Here she loaded a full cargo and personnel for Leyte. The war was now over. After unloading at Leyte, she departed for Manican Island, for a 30-day availability beginning on 20 August 1945. On 23 September 1945, she was ordered to Leyte, and departed for Wakde Island, to load, as part of operations of lifting troops from rear areas. Loading at Wakde, with cargo and personnel for Zamboanga, she reloaded there for Agusan, Mindanao, and from there proceeded to Bacolod, Negros, Philippine Islands, to pick up an amphibious truck company and Philippine Army personnel. Proceeding to Dumaguette, Negros, the Philippine Army personnel were debarked and she proceeded to Mactan Island, unloading the rest of her cargo and personnel at Cebu City, Cebu. Loading at Mactan, she departed for Guiuan, Samar, and after unloading proceeded to San Pedro Bay, Leyte. On 9 November 1945, she was released from Philippine Sea Frontier duty and proceeded to Guiuan, Sanar, to pick up cargo for the United States. She departed 11 November, for the United States via Pearl Harbor.

== Postwar career ==
LST-22 arrived in San Diego, on 12 December 1946, and was decommissioned and her Coast Guard crew removed on 1 April 1946. She was struck from the Navy list on 17 April 1946, and was sold to Ming-Sung Industrial Co., Ltd., of Shanghai, China, on 3 February 1947 to be converted for merchant service.

== Honors and awards ==
LST-22 earned six battle stars for her World War II service.

== Bibliography ==
- "LST-22". Dictionary of American Naval Fighting Ships. Naval History and Heritage Command. 1 June 2015. This article incorporates text from this source, which is in the public domain.
- "USS LST-22". NavSource. 17 October 2014.
- "Convoy HK.109". Arnold Hague Convoy Database.
- "Convoy IG.21". Arnold Hague Convoy Database.
- "USS LST-22" (PDF). United States Coast Guard. This article incorporates text from this source, which is in the public domain.
