= Philotis (mythology) =

In Roman legend, Philotis, also known as Tutula, was a slave (ancilla) whose plan resulted in an important victory of the Romans over the Latins in the late 4th century BC.

Weakened by the Gallic sack of Rome in 390 BC, the Romans had suffered a stinging defeat by the Fidenates, who demanded that they hand over their wives and virgin daughters as hostages to secure a peace. Recounted in Plutarch's biographies of Camillus and Romulus (ca. AD 75), Philotis proposed that she and other slave girls pretend to be the wives and daughters of the Roman families and present themselves to the hostile Latins.

After the Roman Senate agreed to the plan, the women dressed up elegantly, wearing golden jewelry, and visited the enemy camp. There they seduced the Latins into revelry and drinking. After they had fallen asleep, Philotis and the other slaves stole the enemy's swords. Philotis climbed a wild fig tree (caprificus), hiding a torch within her mantle, then brandished it to signal the Romans. The Romans then invaded the Latin camp and killed them in their sleep. The women were rewarded with freedom and a dowry at public expenses.

== Nonae Caprotinae ==
According to Plutarch, the victory was commemorated by the festival of Nonae Caprotinae, held on the seventh day of July, where Rome's women, both free and enslaved, picnicked and celebrated together near the site of the wild fig (caprificus). However, he also recounts that others held it commemorated the anniversary of Romulus's disappearance, suggesting its origins were in dispute by his day. Plutarch considers the Romulus origin more likely, but does not discount the possibility that both events occurred on the same day (albeit 350 years apart), and were thus commemorated together.

== See also ==
- Ficus Ruminalis
