= Whitehead Township, Alleghany County, North Carolina =

Township in North Carolina, United States

Coordinates: 36.4627138°N 81.1306391°W

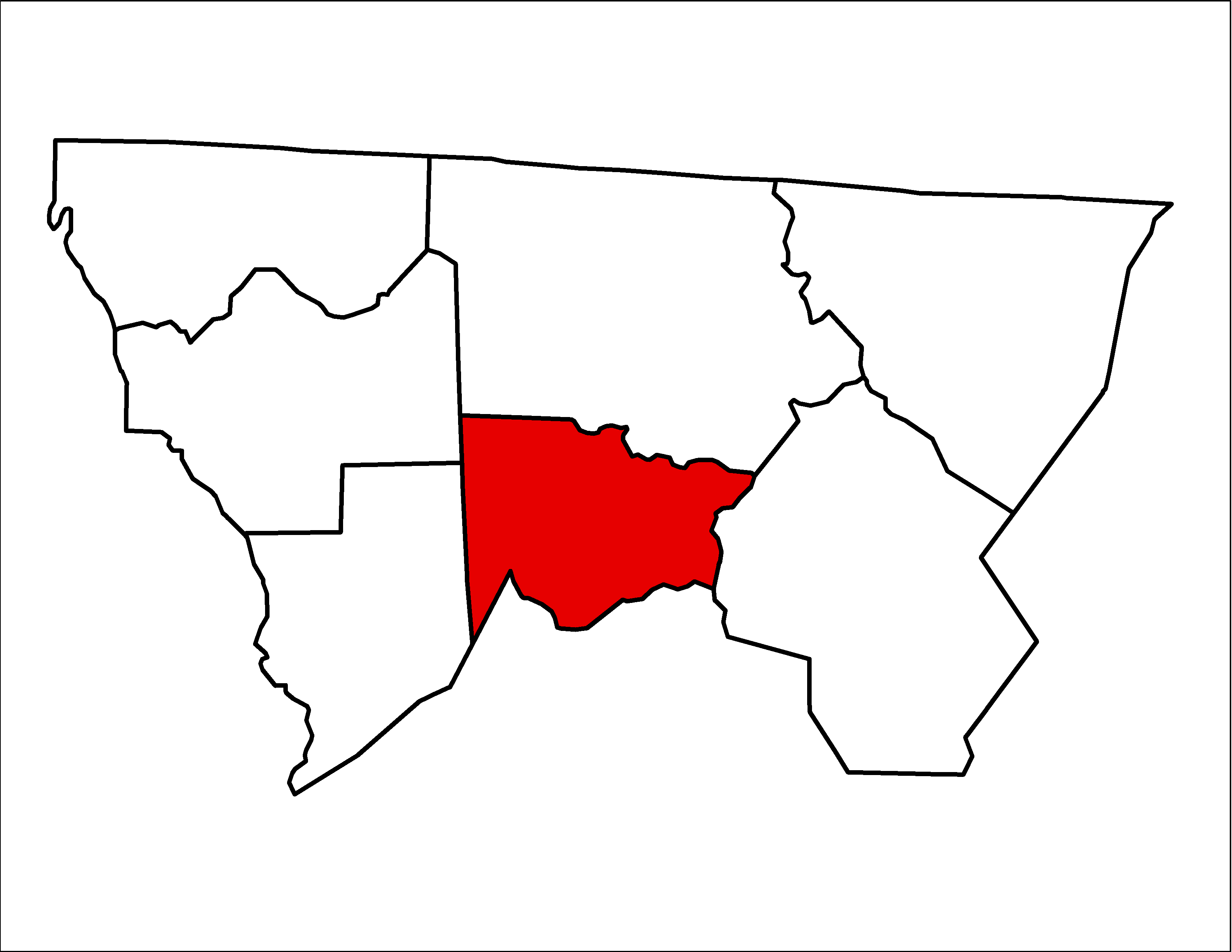
Location of Whitehead Township in Alleghany County, N.C.

Whitehead Township is one of seven townships in Alleghany County, North Carolina, United States. The township had a population of 1,060 according to the 2010 census.

Whitehead Township occupies 24.0 square miles (62.1 km^{2}) in central Alleghany County. The township's southern border is with Wilkes County.
