= Haw River Trail =

Trail in North Carolina

The Haw River State Trail is an 80-mile (130 km) long multi-use trail through the North Carolina Piedmont. The trail follows the path of the Haw River from Haw River State Park on the Rockingham/Guilford County line to Jordan Lake State Recreation Area. The North Carolina General Assembly authorized its addition to the State Trails System in June 2023.

== Land trail ==
About 20 miles of surface trails for hiking, mountain biking, birdwatching, nature lovers, and horse riding are currently open to the public along the Haw River Trail in locations including Haw River State Park, Swepsonville River Park, Glencoe, and Sellers Falls. Additional trails are expected to be built in order to complete the planned 70 mile trail.

The land trail will follow the Haw River across Alamance from where it enters near Altamahaw, then around Burlington and Graham, through Swepsonville, and past Saxapahaw.

For over a third of the stretch of the Haw River Trail, from Haw River State Park to the confluence with Cane Creek in Alamance County, it will combine with the North Carolina Mountains-to-Sea Trail (MST). The MST begins at Kuwohi on the State’s western border and terminates at Jockey's Ridge on the Outer Banks.

Swepsonville had the honor of being first trail segment designated. Mayor Herring received a call from the MST meeting participants, as they had just voted to reroute the trail through his town. He put in the first request for MST designation, and the town park became the first on the Haw River with a MST designation in 2008, with the help of the State Trails Coordinator, Darrell McBane.

== Paddle trail ==
The Haw River Paddle Trail is a part of the Haw River Trail providing access for canoeing and kayaking. The paddle trail has 10 access sites in Alamance County to include Altamahaw Ossipee, Shallow Ford Natural Area, Indian Valley Golf Club, Glencoe Paddle Access, Great Alamanace Creek on Hwy 87, Graham Paddle Access/Hwy 54, Saxapahaw Lake, Greensboro-Chapel Hill Road, and 4 accesses in Chatham County and 4 in Guilford County. Formal accesses are regularly maintained and patrolled and provide paddlers with the assurance that public access rights have been legally secured. Informal access sites are those that have been traditionally used by paddlers.

== Conservation efforts ==
The Haw River Trail attempts to combine recreation and conservation goals into one effort. The Haw River Trail Partnership promotes the idea that the Haw River Trail boosts conservation efforts by increasing public awareness for the river and building a consensus for conservation. Simultaneously, the conservation work on the Haw River provides a protected landscape for the Haw River Trail. As of November, 2008, the HRT Partnership has conserved over 1,000 acres (4.0 km^{2}) of riverside property and 7,400 feet (2,300 m) of riverbank since 2006. In 2006, an innovative agreement was reached between 10 governmental agencies, referred to as a Memorandum of Understanding, in which the organizations agreed to work together for the development of the Haw River Trail and the conservation of its land and waters. A coordinator position is also funded by the cities of Burlington and Graham, as Alamance County to further conservation and recreation efforts on the Haw River.
