= Mountains-to-Sea Trail =

Long-distance hiking trail in North Carolina, United States

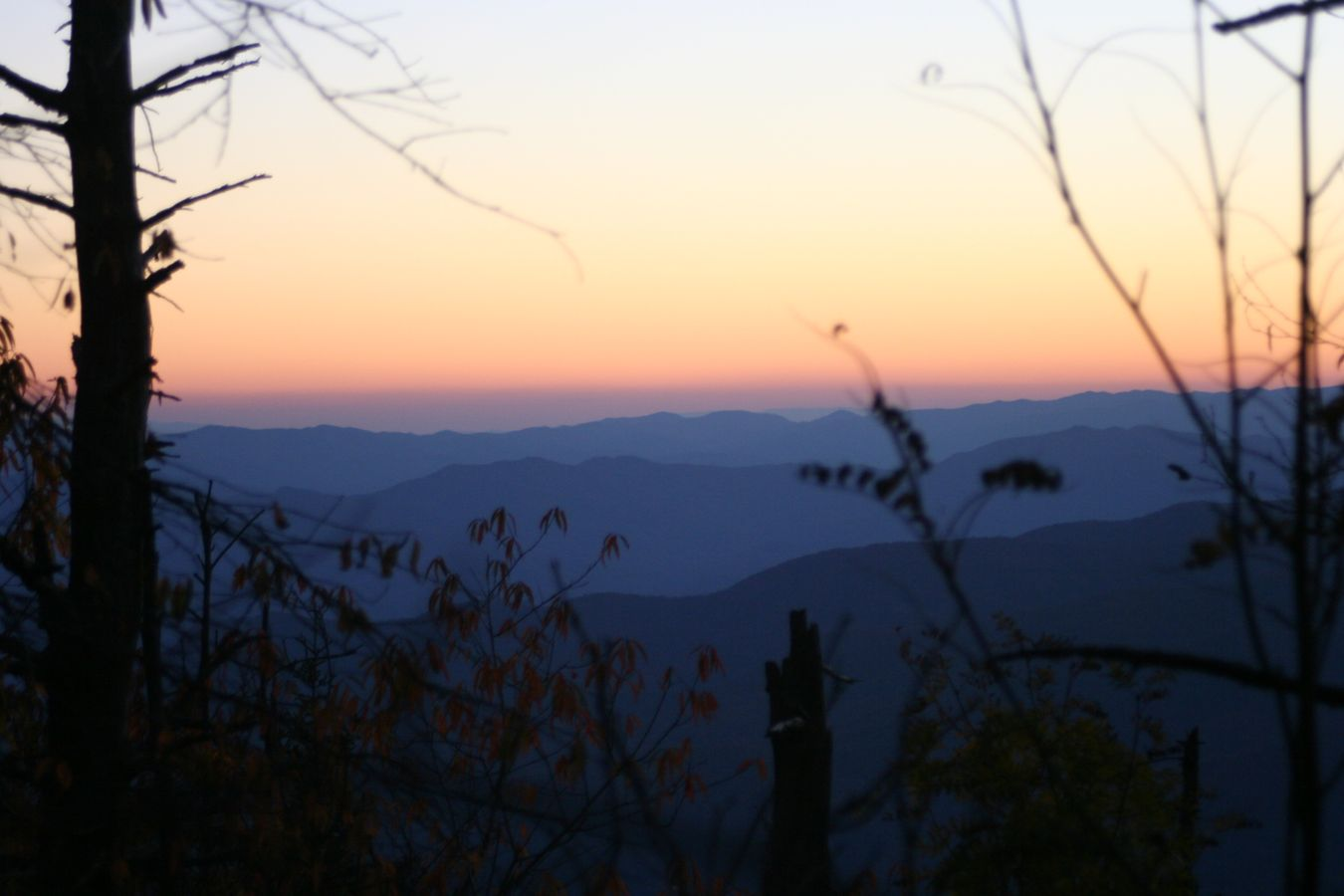
- Sunset view from Kuwohi, the western terminus of the trail
- Length: 1,175 mi (1,891 km)
- Location: North Carolina, United States
- Designation: National Recreation Trail; North Carolina State Trail
- Trailheads: Jockey's Ridge, Kuwohi
- Use: Hiking
- Elevation change: 6,684 ft (2,037 m)
- Highest point: Mount Mitchell
- Lowest point: Pamlico Sound
- Difficulty: Moderate to Strenuous
- Sights: Appalachian Mountains; Sauratown Mountains; Multiple rivers Outer Banks
- Hazards: American alligator American black bear Biting flies Chiggers; Diarrhea from water Dog attacks Limited water Mosquitos; Poison ivy Severe weather Steep grades Tick-borne diseases Traffic collisions Venomous snakes Yellowjackets
- Surface: Natural, sand, gravel, boardwalk, asphalt
- Website: https://mountainstoseatrail.org/

The Mountains-to-Sea State Trail (MST) is a long-distance trail in the US for hiking and backpacking, that traverses North Carolina from the Great Smoky Mountains to the Outer Banks. Its western endpoint is at Kuwohi, where it connects to the Appalachian Trail in the Great Smoky Mountains National Park. Its eastern endpoint is in Jockey's Ridge State Park on the tallest sand dune on the east coast. The trail is envisioned as a scenic backbone of an interconnected trail system spanning the state. As such, its route attempts to connect as many trail systems and natural scenic areas as practicable. A little over half of the trail is complete in multiple segments across the state.

The Mountains-to-Sea State Park Trail was made an official land-based unit of the state park system by the North Carolina General Assembly on August 2, 2000. Since that time, the state trail unit has grown to encompass 691 acres (280 ha) in three tracts and 87 acres (35 ha) in conservation easements. Each of these tracts is leased to local governments for management as nature parks, under the guidance of the NC Division of Parks and Recreation (NCDPR). The vast majority of the foot trail is located on lands not directly managed as part of a state park unit.

The trail is a part of the North Carolina State Trails System, which is a section of NCDPR and, by January 2019, 669 miles (1,077 km) of trail had been designated as a part of the MST by NCDPR.

The segments of MST along the Blue Ridge Parkway were designated as a National Recreation Trail in 2005.

The MST has the distinction of being the highest elevation long-distance trail in the eastern United States as it crosses Mount Mitchell at 6,684 feet (2,037 m).

== Incorporated trails ==
The MST incorporates several other notable trails as part of its route.

- The MST shares several miles of its route with the Appalachian Trail near the MST's western trail-head.
- Art Loeb Trail
- The MST follows most of the Tanawha Trail's length.
- The MST shares most of the Sauratown Trail's route, which is the only bridle trail that connects two North Carolina state parks and is the longest trail on private owned lands in the state.
- A recent addition to the trail is the Haw River Trail which begins at Haw River State Park in Guilford and Chatham counties and continues to Cane Creek in southern Alamance County. This addition is under review pending appeals and resolution of access issues.
- The trail follows the Eno River State Park trail system to the Falls Lake Trail, which it follows to the Neuse River Trail.
- The MST follows the Neuse River Trail for its length.
- The MST follows the entire length of the Neusiok Trail.

== Camping ==
Hikers should be aware that the Mountains-To-Sea State Trail does contain camping restrictions across its route. Hikers should research and follow all rules and regulations for camping, as the MST does cross through lands managed by various public and private land agencies and individuals.

In the mountain section, starting in the Great Smoky Mountains National Park, camping is allowed at permissible campsites with a back-country permit. The GSMNP back-country office can provide permit and reservation information.

Camping within the Blue Ridge Parkway corridor is prohibited except for permissible parkway campgrounds (Doughton Park, Julian Price Park, Linville Falls, Crabtree Meadows and Mt. Pisgah). In some areas, hikers can cross the BRP boundary lines into the Nantalhala and Pisgah National Forests to camp at well-established campsites. Planning is being done to create designated, private campsites for the MST on parkway land, but the only backpack site currently open is in Julian Price Park.

On the North Carolina Piedmont section of the MST, camping is not permitted along the Sauratown Trail section (from Pilot Mountain to Hanging Rock State Parks) since the trail is managed and maintained on land leased from private landowners. A list of nearby campgrounds and lodging is maintained on the Sauratown Trails Association website. There are three privately managed campgrounds a short distance off the Sauratown Trail.

Camping inside the North Carolina State Parks is only allowed at permissible camping sites and campgrounds. Large sections of the Falls Lake State Recreation Area and neighboring public lands managed by the Army Corps of Engineers also prohibit camping.

Stealth camping or any illegal camping along the MST is highly discouraged. Possible citations and fines may be enforced if such camping is found by the managing land agency.

== Park lands ==
The MST as a State Trail unit of the state park system encompasses 691 acres (280 ha) of land in three tracts. The North Carolina Division of Parks and Recreation (NCDPR) leases each of these tracts to local governments for operation as nature parks.

=== Shallow Ford Natural Area ===
Shallow Ford Natural Area consists of 191 acres (77 ha) located in Alamance County along the banks of the Haw River, and it is managed by the Alamance County Recreation and Parks Department. The natural area has a small, volunteer built trail network, which includes the MST, a few primitive campsites, a canoe access and a picnic area. The natural area was acquired to help fill in a gap in the MST.

=== Richardson-Taylor Preserve ===
The Richardson-Taylor Preserve, formally known as the Morton-Richardson Tract, is a 440-acre (180 ha) nature preserve that was jointly acquired by the Guilford County Open Space Program and the State of North Carolina. The preserve was acquired in two parts, the Taylor Tract and the Richardson Tract and opened in 2013. The 196-acre (79 ha) Taylor Tract was bought by the state park system from the Morton family, who also sold Grandfather Mountain to the state. The Richardson Tract was bought by Guilford County, partly using grants from the state. Both tracts are intended to be managed together as a buffer for the Greensboro Watershed and as a corridor for the MST to reach Haw River State Park from the watershed trails. The Greensboro Parks & Recreation Department manages the preserve with guidance from the Guildford County Open Space Committee and the NC Division of Parks and Recreation.

=== Clayton River Walk ===
A third tract was leased to the Town of Clayton for use as part of the Clayton River Walk which serves as an extension of the Neuse River Trail into Johnston County, and it is also utilized as part of the East Coast Greenway's route. NCDPR owns the northernmost property the River Walk crosses.

== Speed records ==
As of January 2025, the speed records on the Mountains-to-Sea trail are as follows:

- Brandon Stapanowich, 23d, 13h, 28 m (Supported). Set June 2022.
- Sam Holcomb, 29d, 20h, 3m (Self-supported). Set Oct. 2023.
- Tara Dower, 29d, 20h, 3m (Supported). Set Sept. 2020.

== List of destinations ==
The trail currently passes or is planned to pass through several notable natural areas in North Carolina. This list notes them from west to east:

- Great Smoky Mountains National Park (Location of western trail-head)
- The Blue Ridge Parkway (The trail roughly follows the parkway throughout the mountains.)
- Nantahala National Forest
- Middle Prong Wilderness
- Pisgah National Forest
- Mount Pisgah Recreation Area (Blue Ridge Parkway)
- Bent Creek Experimental Forest
- Craggy Gardens Recreation Area (Blue Ridge Parkway)
- Mount Mitchell State Park
- Lake James State Park (connected via designated spur trail)
- Linville Gorge Wilderness
- Harper Creek Wilderness Study Area
- Lost Cove Wilderness Study Area
- Grandfather Mountain State Park
- Julian Price Memorial Park (Blue Ridge Parkway)
- Moses H. Cone Memorial Park (Blue Ridge Parkway)
- E. B. Jeffress Park (Blue Ridge Parkway)
- Doughton Park (Blue Ridge Parkway)
- Stone Mountain State Park
- Pilot Mountain State Park
- Hanging Rock State Park
- Greensboro Watershed
- Richardson-Taylor Preserve (Part of the State Park Trail)
- Haw River State Park
- Shallow Ford Natural Area (Part of the State Park Trail)
- Occoneechee Mountain State Natural Area
- Eno River State Park
- Falls Lake State Recreation Area
- Cliffs of the Neuse State Park
- Cherry Branch – Minnesott Ferry
- Croatan National Forest
- Cedar Island National Wildlife Refuge
- Cedar Island – Ocracoke Ferry
- Cape Hatteras National Seashore
- Hatteras – Ocracoke Ferry
- Pea Island National Wildlife Refuge
- Jockey's Ridge State Park (Location of eastern trail-head)

== Photo gallery ==
These are images of or along the MST going from west to east:

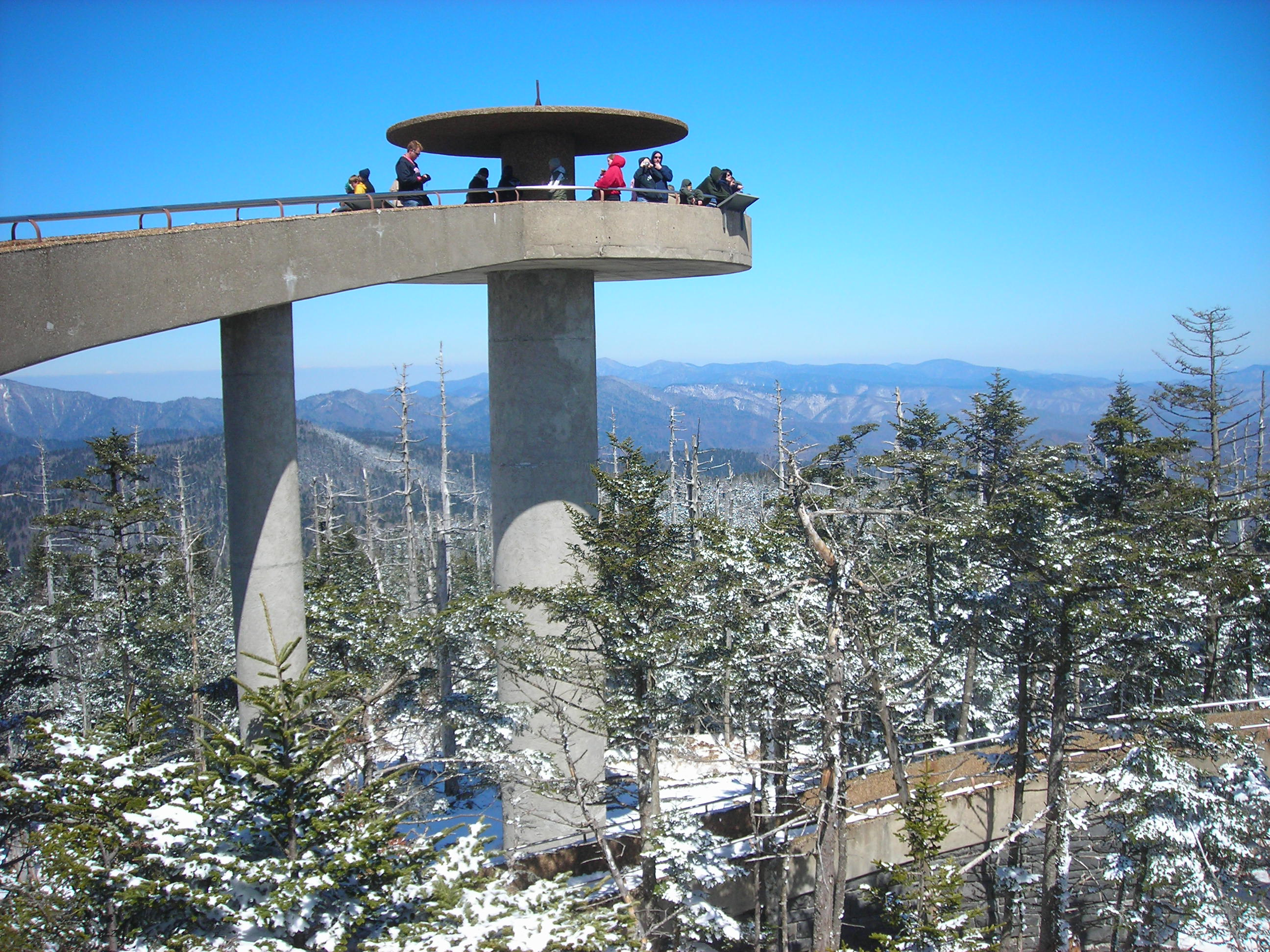
The western trail head, Kuwohi, on a snowy day.

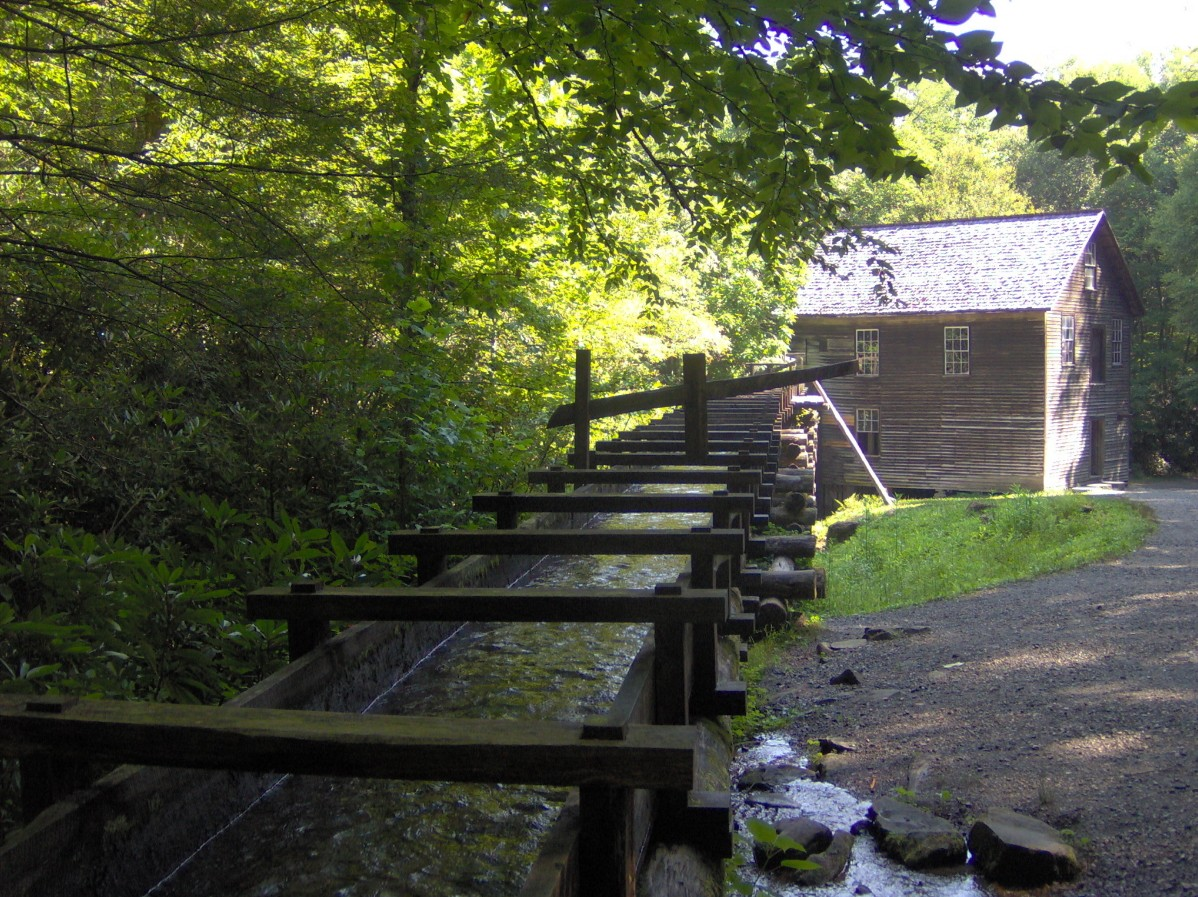
Mingus mill in the Great Smoky Mountains National Park.

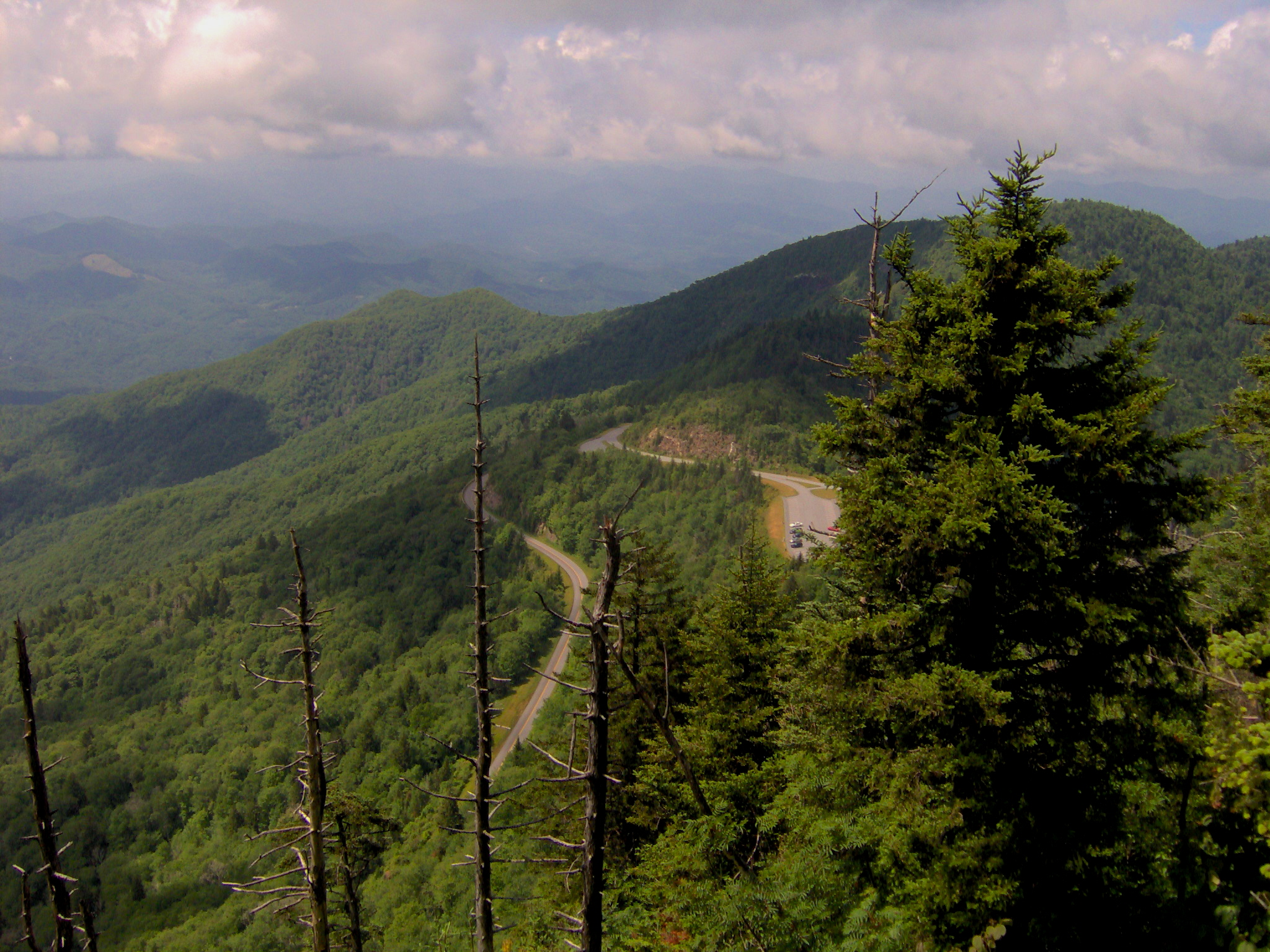
Waterrock Knob on the Blue Ridge Parkway.

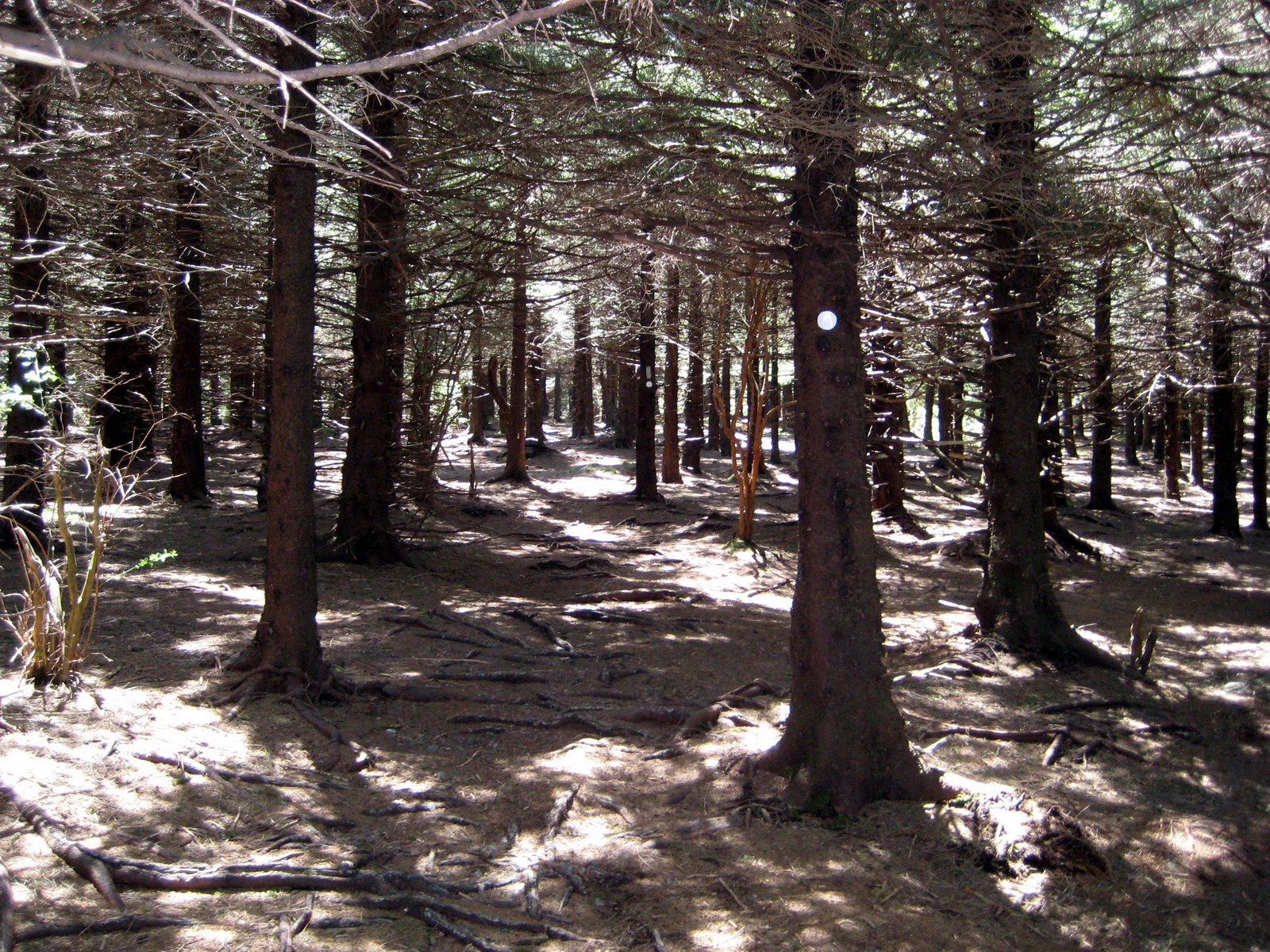
Near the Blue Ridge Parkway in Pisgah National Forest, the MST shares a short stretch with the Art Loeb Trail

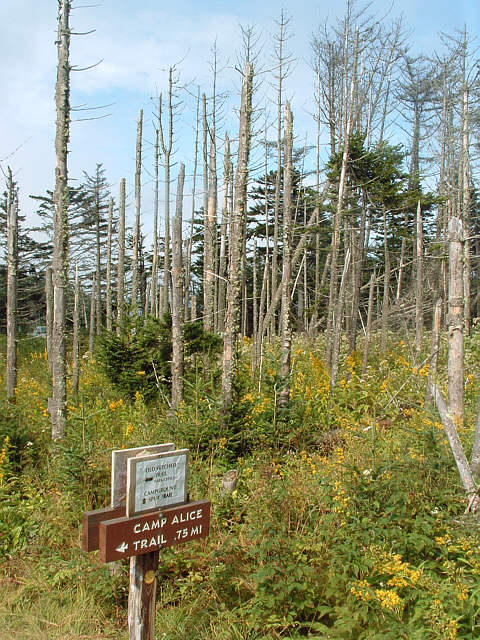
The MST follows the Camp Alice Trail through Mount Mitchell State Park.

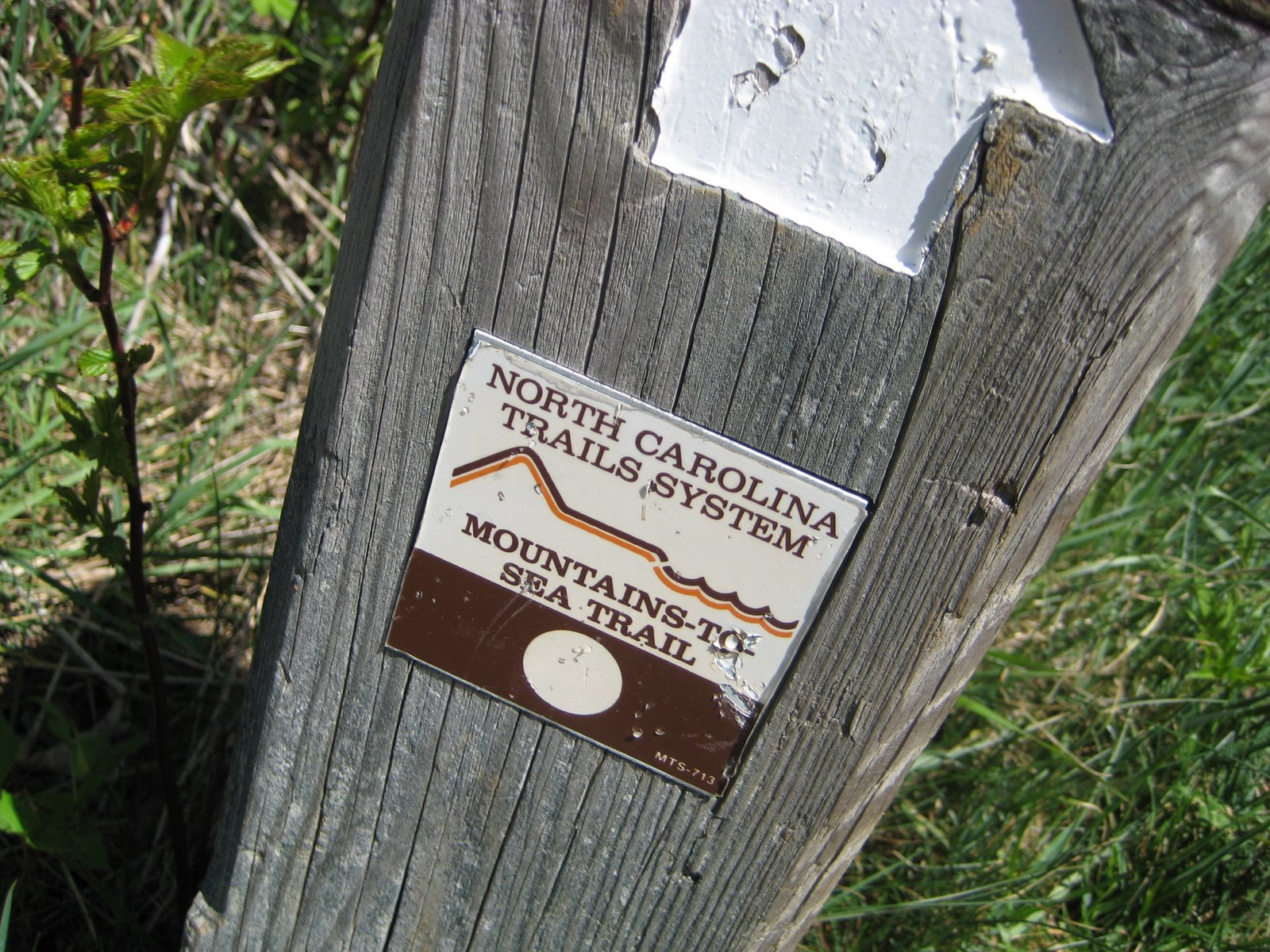
A MST sign post on the Blue Ridge Parkway.

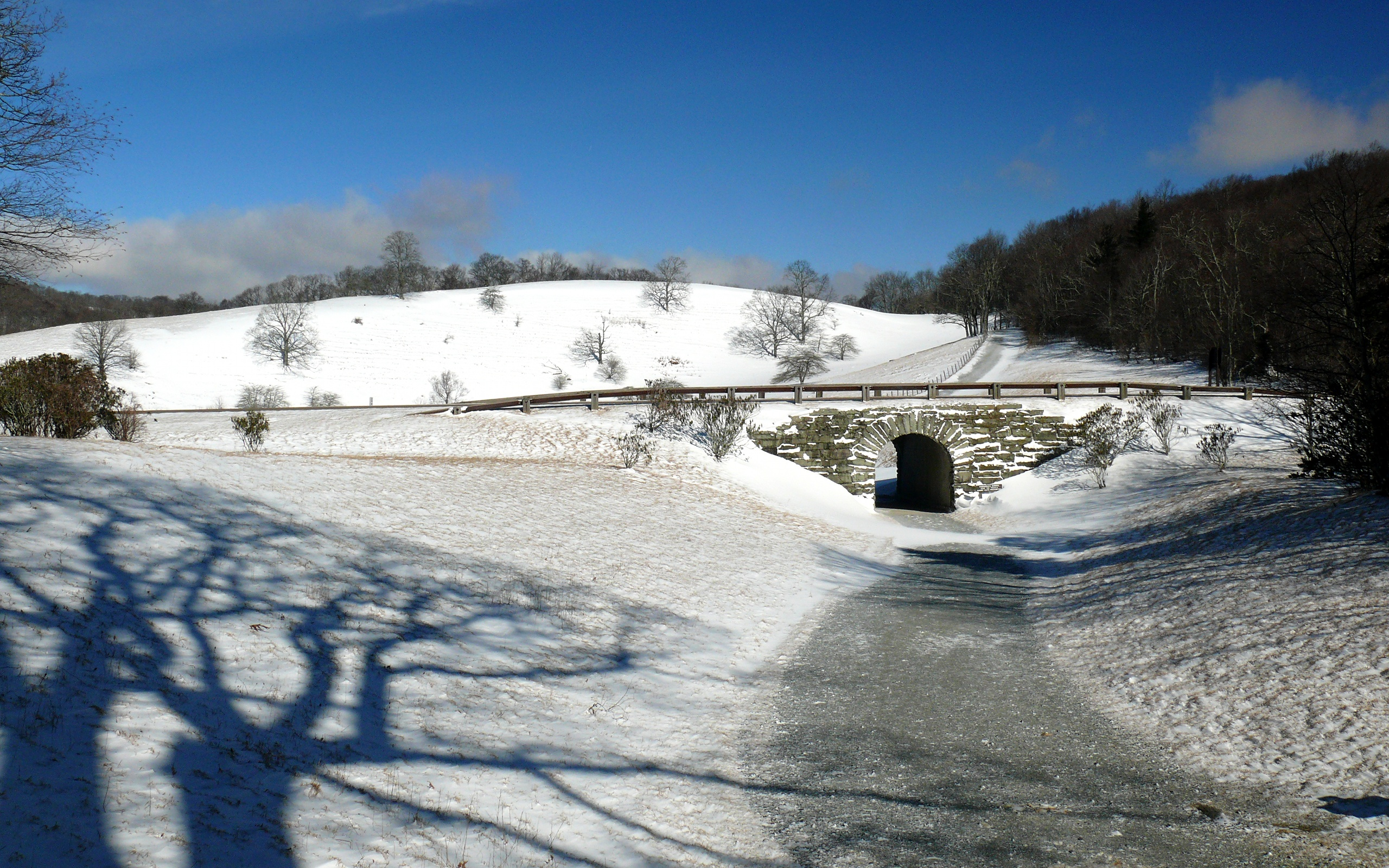
The MST crossing under a snowy Blue Ridge Parkway in Moses H. Cone Memorial Park.

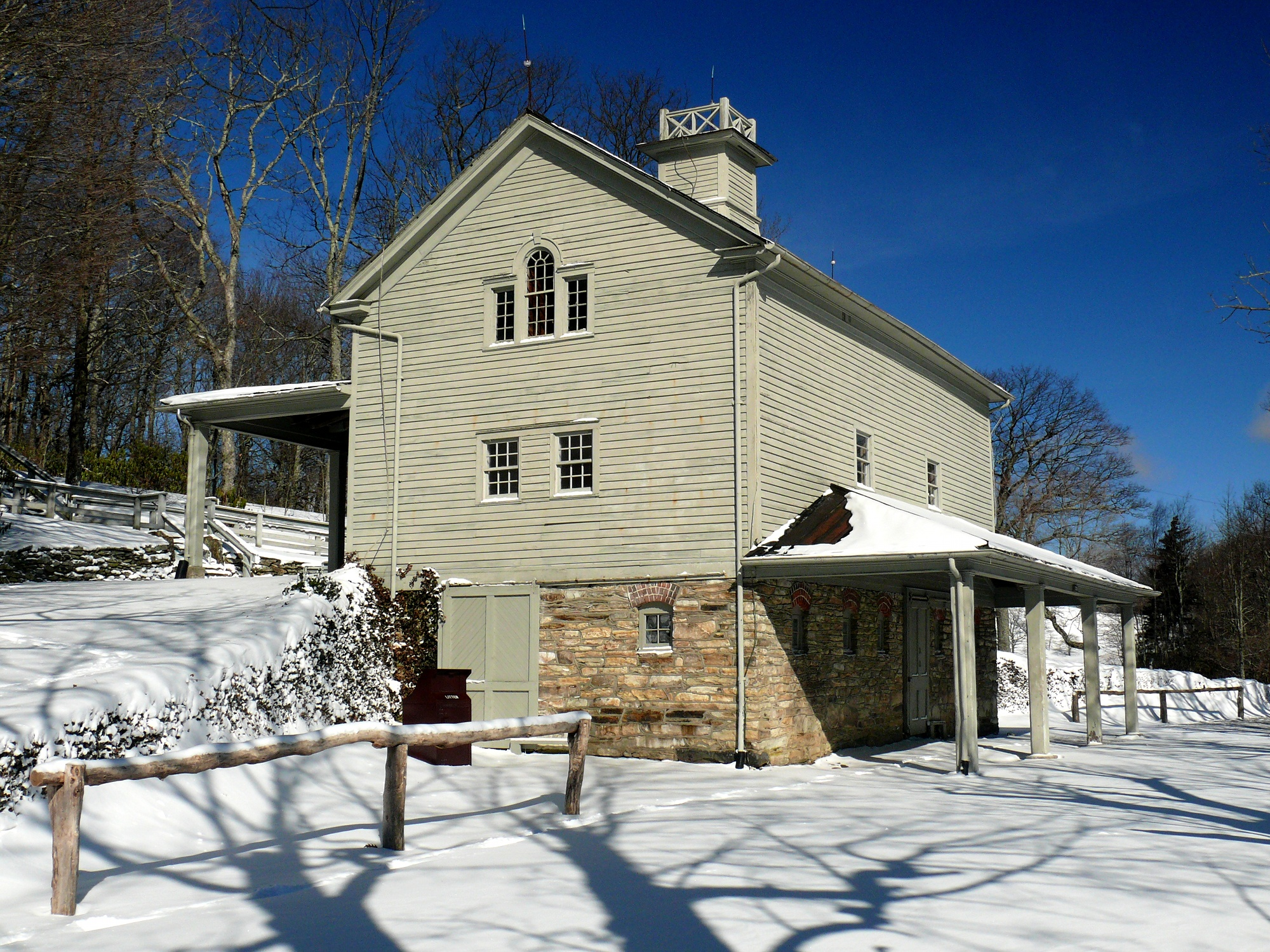
The carriage house at Moses H. Cone Memorial Park, which the trail passes by.

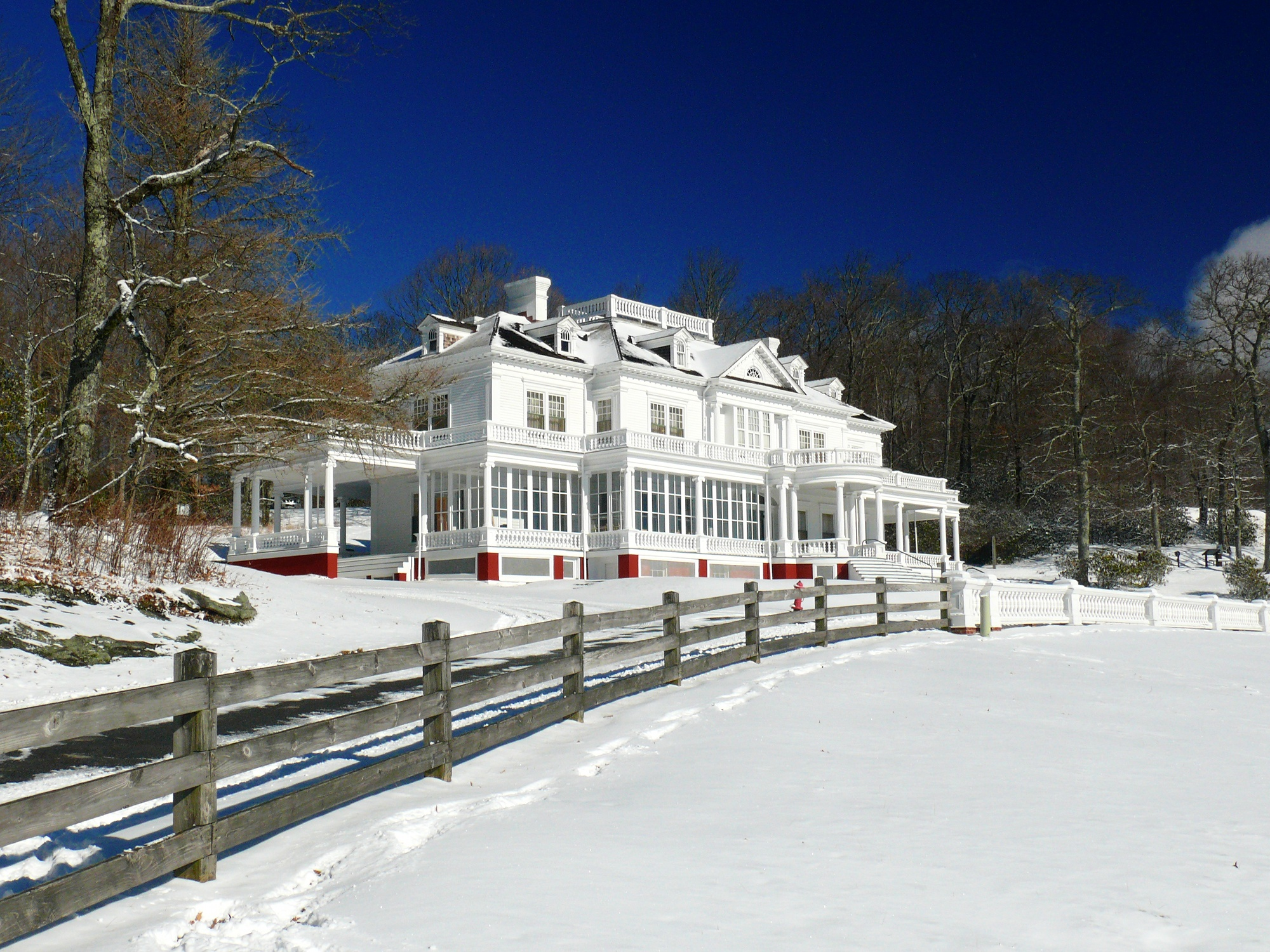
The trail switchbacks near Flat Top Manor at Moses H. Cone Memorial Park.
(The trail is not visible from this angle.)

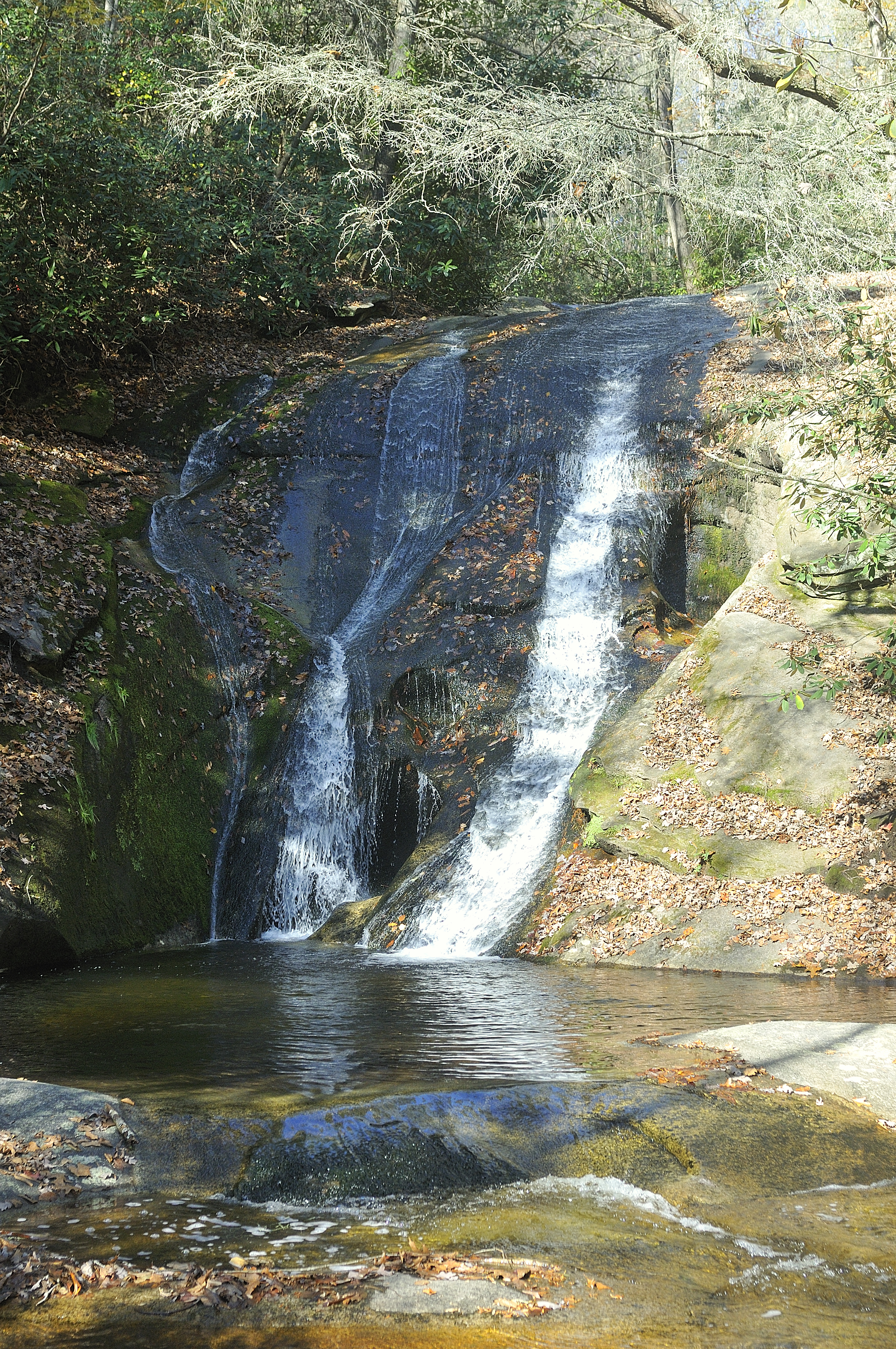
Widow Creek Falls in Stone Mountain State Park is a short spur walk off the trail.

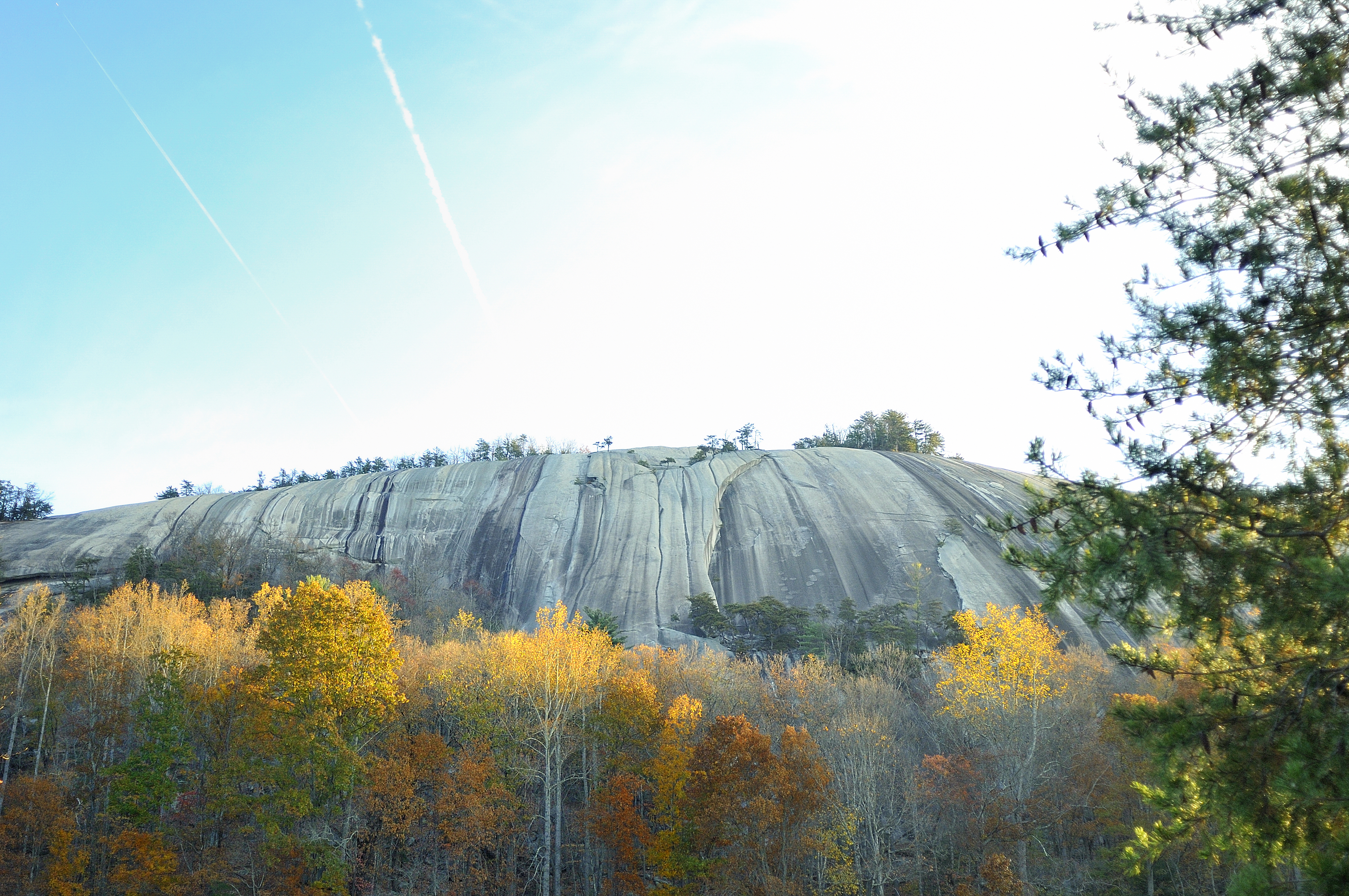
Stone Mountain of Stone Mountain State Park.

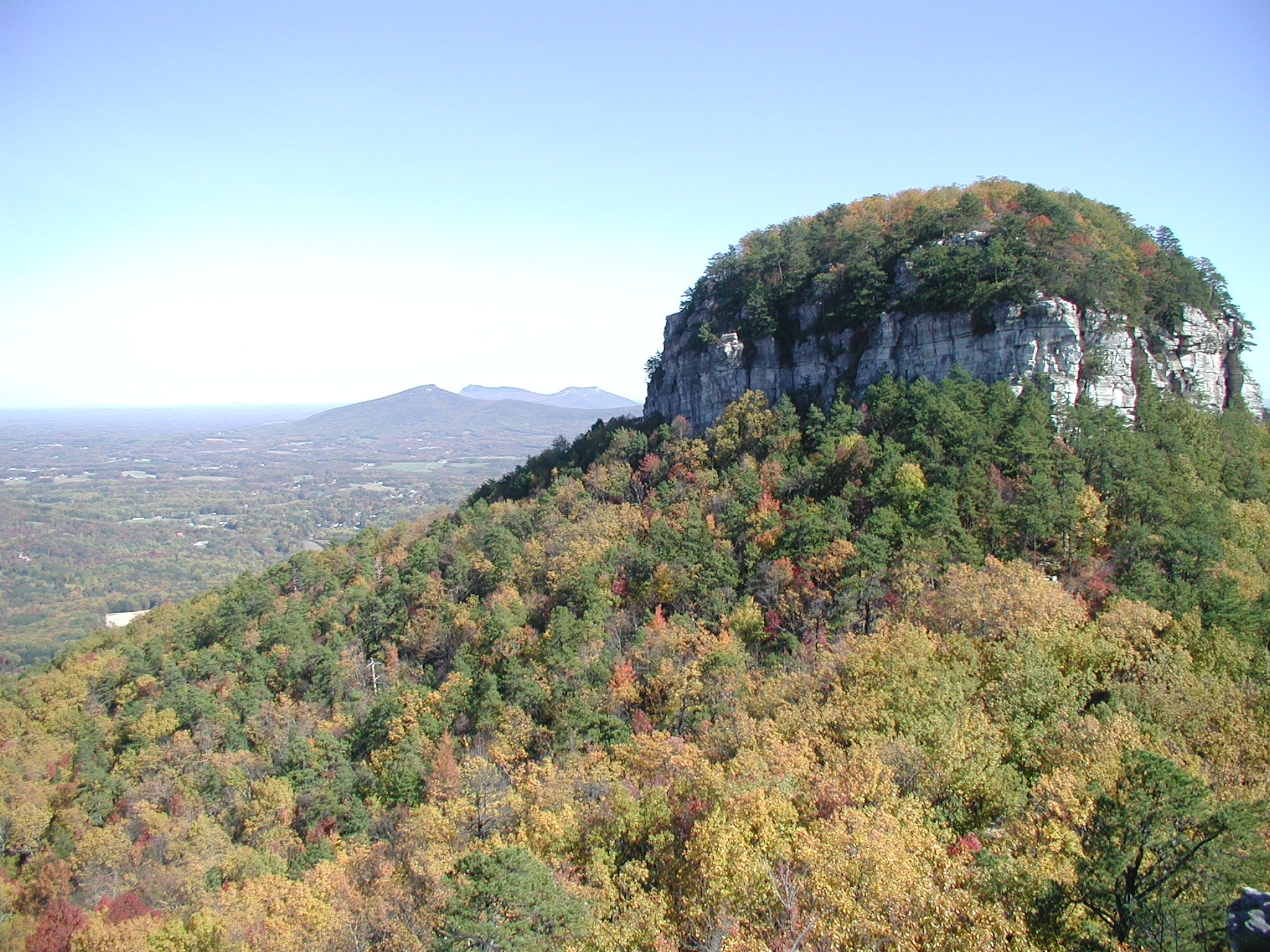
View from the Little Pinnacle at Pilot Mountain State Park. The MST follows the Sauratown Trail from the Pilot to the mountains seen in the distance.

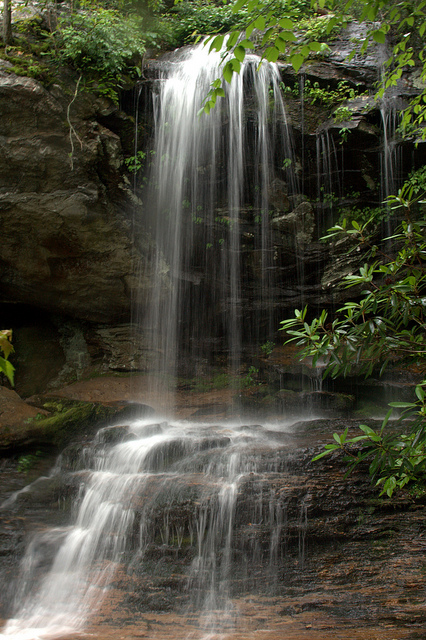
Lower drop of Window Falls at Hanging Rock State Park.

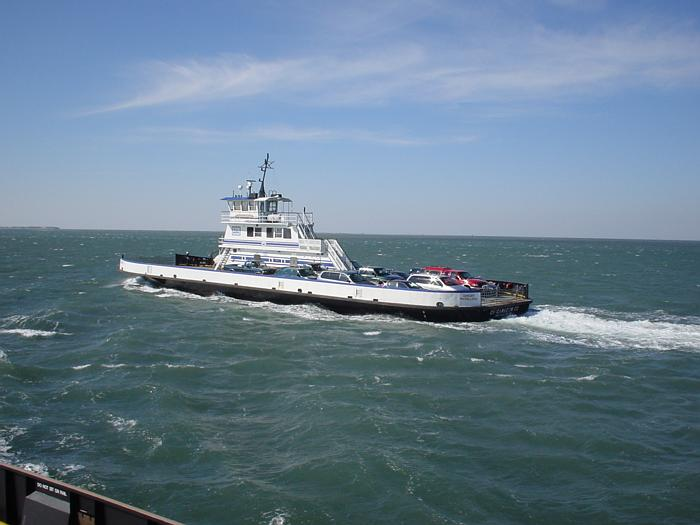
A ferry on the Hatteras – Ocracoke ferry route, which the MST utilizes.

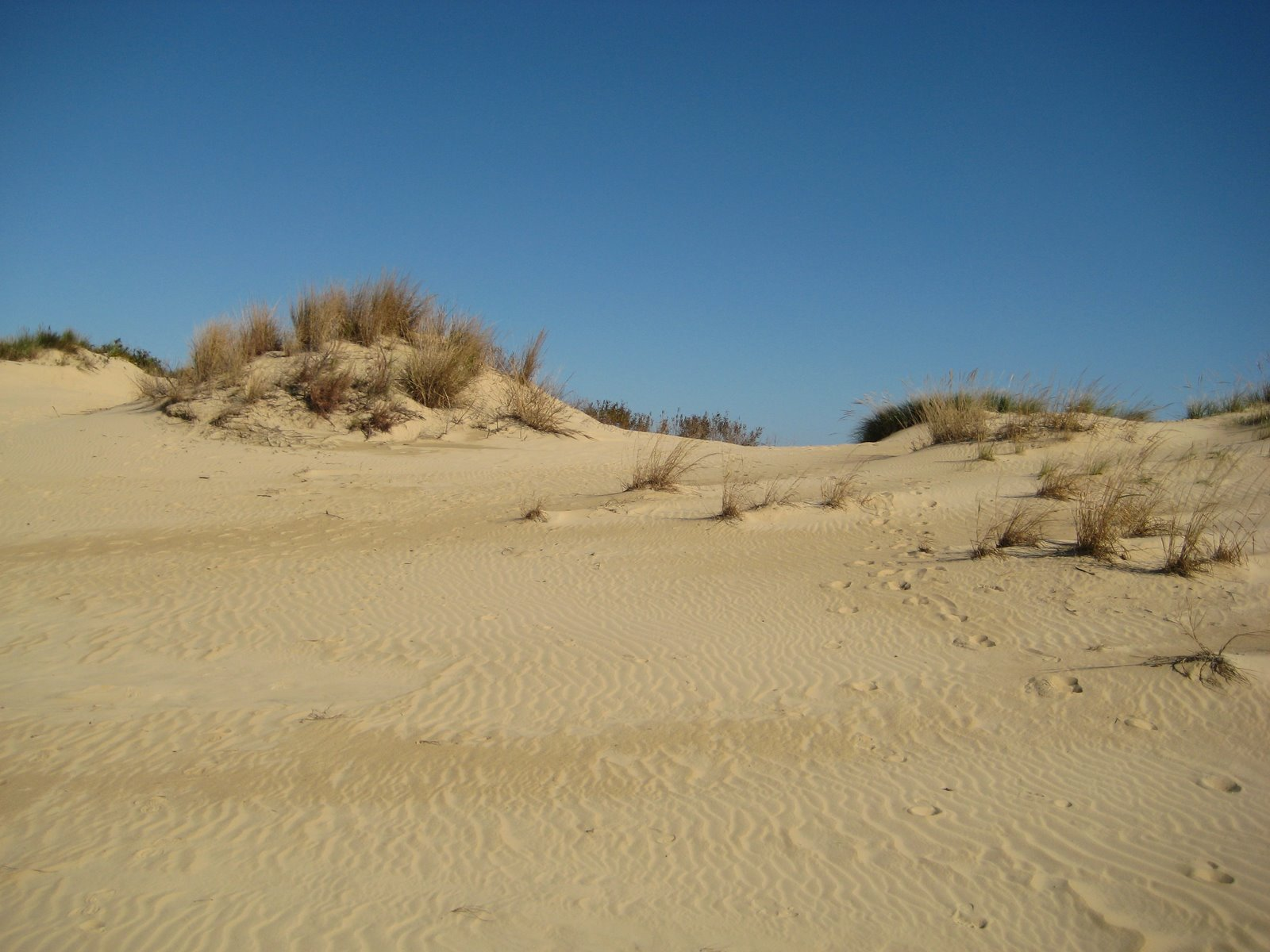
Jockey's Ridge State Park, the eastern trail head.
