= Pilot Mountain (North Carolina) =

Mountain in North Carolina, United States

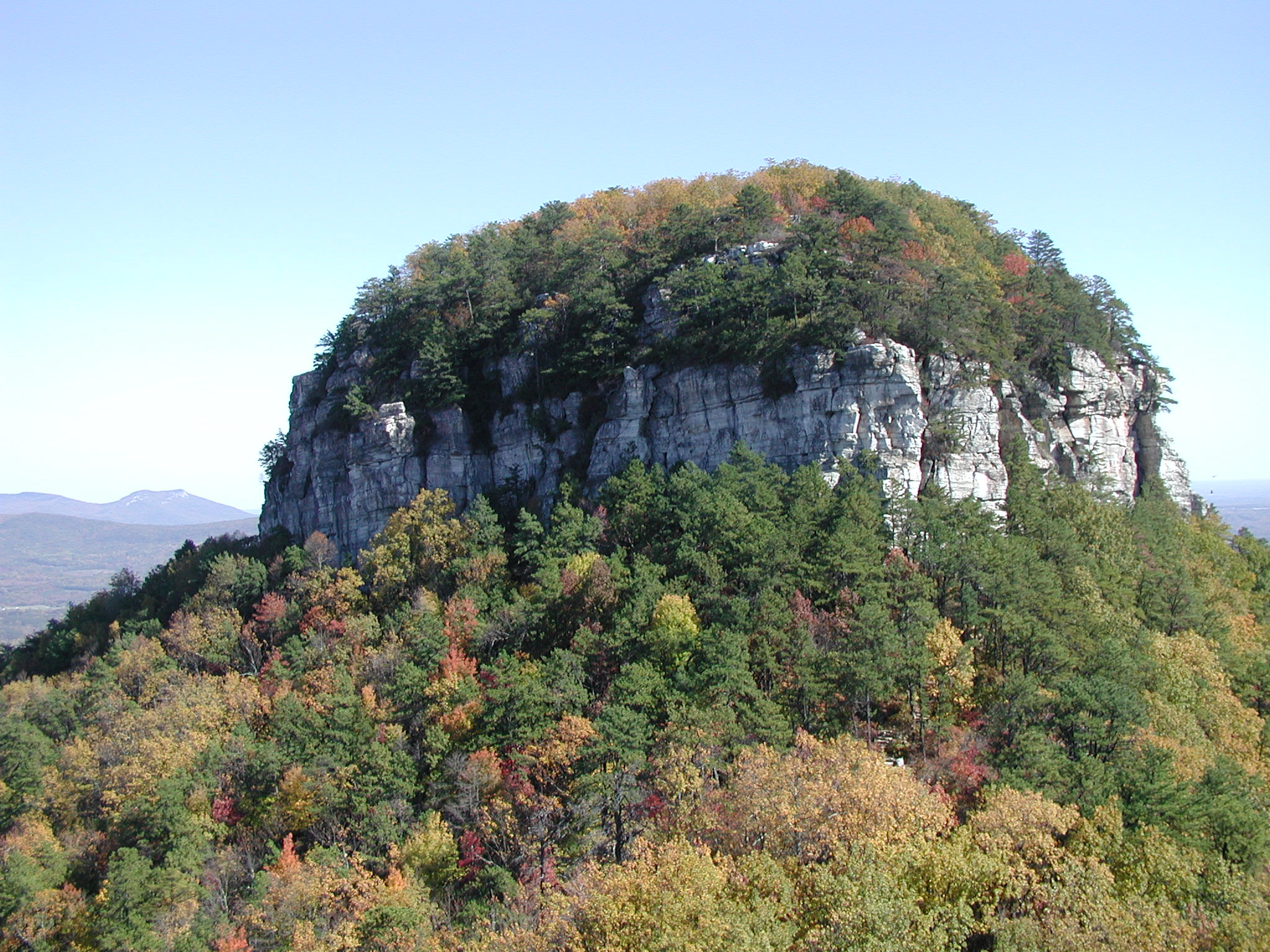
- The Big Pinnacle of Pilot Mountain, as viewed from Little Pinnacle Overlook.

Highest point
- Elevation: 2,421 ft (738 m)
- Coordinates: 36°20′24″N 80°28′27″W

Geography
- Location within North Carolina
- Location: Surry County, North Carolina, U.S.
- Parent range: Sauratown Mountains
- Topo map: USGS Pinnacle

Climbing
- Easiest route: Goldilocks, Grandpa's Belay. Big Pinnacle is closed to climbing.

U.S. National Natural Landmark
- Designated: 1974

Pilot Mountain, a monadnock rising to a peak 2,421 feet (738 m) above sea level, is one of the most distinctive natural features in the U.S. state of North Carolina. It is a remnant of the ancient chain of Sauratown Mountains.

== Description ==
U.S. Route 52 passes through the town of Pilot Mountain near the mountain, which is about 20 miles northwest of Winston-Salem, and the city of Mount Airy is 14 miles farther north.

Pilot Mountain has two distinctive features, named Big Pinnacle and Little Pinnacle. Big Pinnacle (also called "The Knob") has high and colorful bare rock walls, with a rounded top covered by vegetation, reaching approximately 1,400 feet (430 m) above the surrounding terrain. Visitors can take a paved road to the park visitor center and campgrounds, then up to a parking lot on the ridge. Trails from there allow access to the main Little Pinnacle Overlook and other viewing stations.

Pilot Mountain is part of Pilot Mountain State Park, which extends to the Yadkin River via a corridor of land, and it is associated with nearby Horne Creek Living Historical Farm. The curved depression between the ridge slope, the Little Pinnacle, and the round knob of the Big Pinnacle enhances the mountain's distinctive appearance from a distance. Other interesting rock formations are to the east at privately held Sauratown Mountain, and the higher complex at Hanging Rock State Park.

In November 2021, a 1,050-acre wildfire covered Pilot Mountain State Park. This fire enveloped Pilot Mountain as well, with smoke covering the iconic Knob.

== Trails ==
The Jomeokee Trail leads around the base of Big Pinnacle. The Ledge Spring Trail goes past a large picnic area and down along the ridge crest; its lower loop back up past a small perennial spring follows a long cliff that is a popular location for rock climbing. Big Pinnacle is closed to climbing. Other trails include Sassafras Trail and Grindstone Trail, which connects the popular campground to Ledge Spring Trail. Mountain Trail follows up the other side of the ridge to also connect to Ledge Spring Trail. The Grassy Ridge Trail follows along the mountain's base, connecting the lower ends of the Mountain and Grindstone Trails together. The Grassy Ridge Trail also connects to the Corridor Trail, which goes to the park's river section, and it connects to the Mountains-to-Sea and Sauratown Trails, which go to Hanging Rock State Park.

== Geology ==
Pilot Mountain is, as mentioned above, a monadnock. Lying on the Sauratown Mountain anticlinorium, it was formed during the Alleghenian Orogeny from Gondwanan beach sand, which lithified into 98% pure quartzite from the pressure of being forced under Laurentia. As the mountain eroded away, the solid core of quartzite remained stable, resulting in Big Pinnacle, the unique dome structure on top of the mountain. Little Pinnacle is made of biotite gneiss, compositely layered with schist. Towards the base of the mountain, colluvium from an ancient seabed makes up the majority of the structure.

== Gallery ==
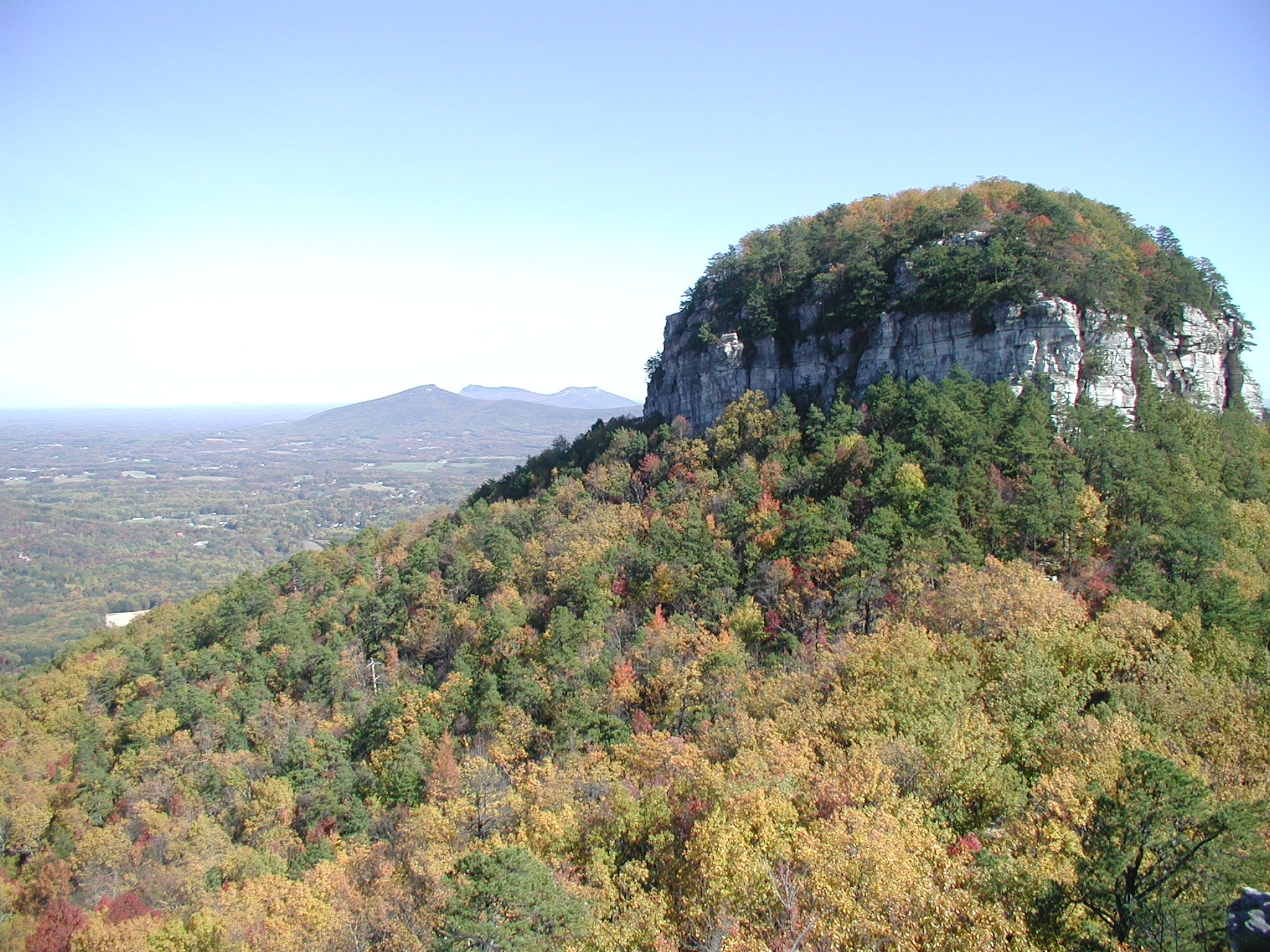
A view in fall of Big Pinnacle from Little Pinnacle Overlook, with Sauratown Mountain and Hanging Rock State Park seen beyond that.

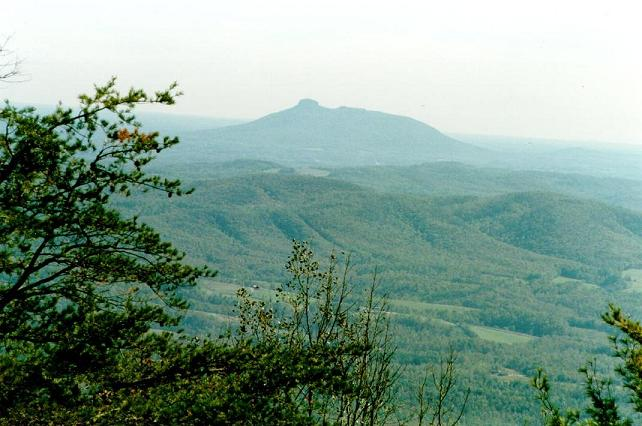
Pilot Mountain's distinctive "saddle" shape as seen from the north. Pilot can also be seen from mile marker 189.1 of the Blue Ridge Parkway in Virginia.

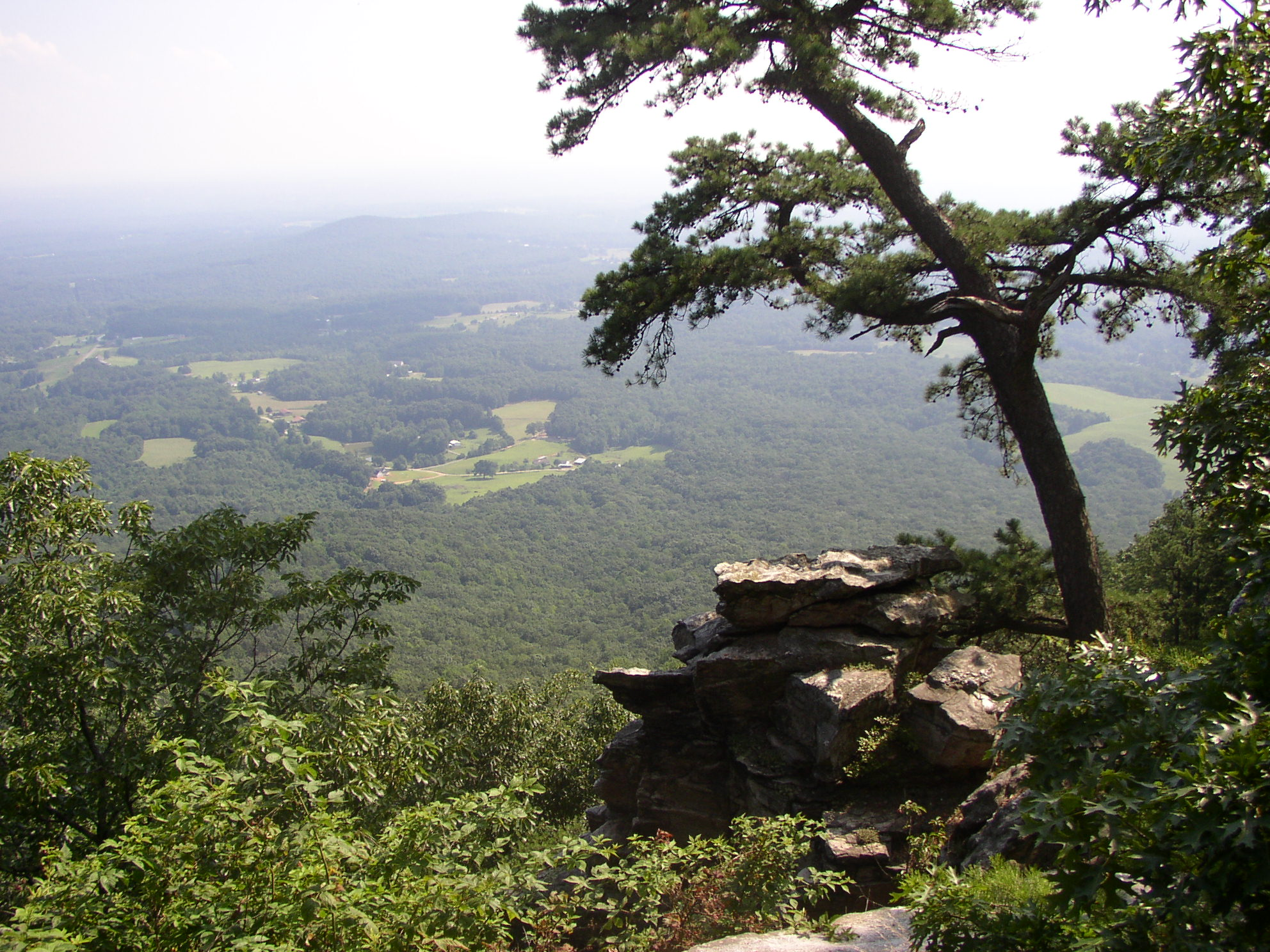
A view south toward Winston-Salem, NC.

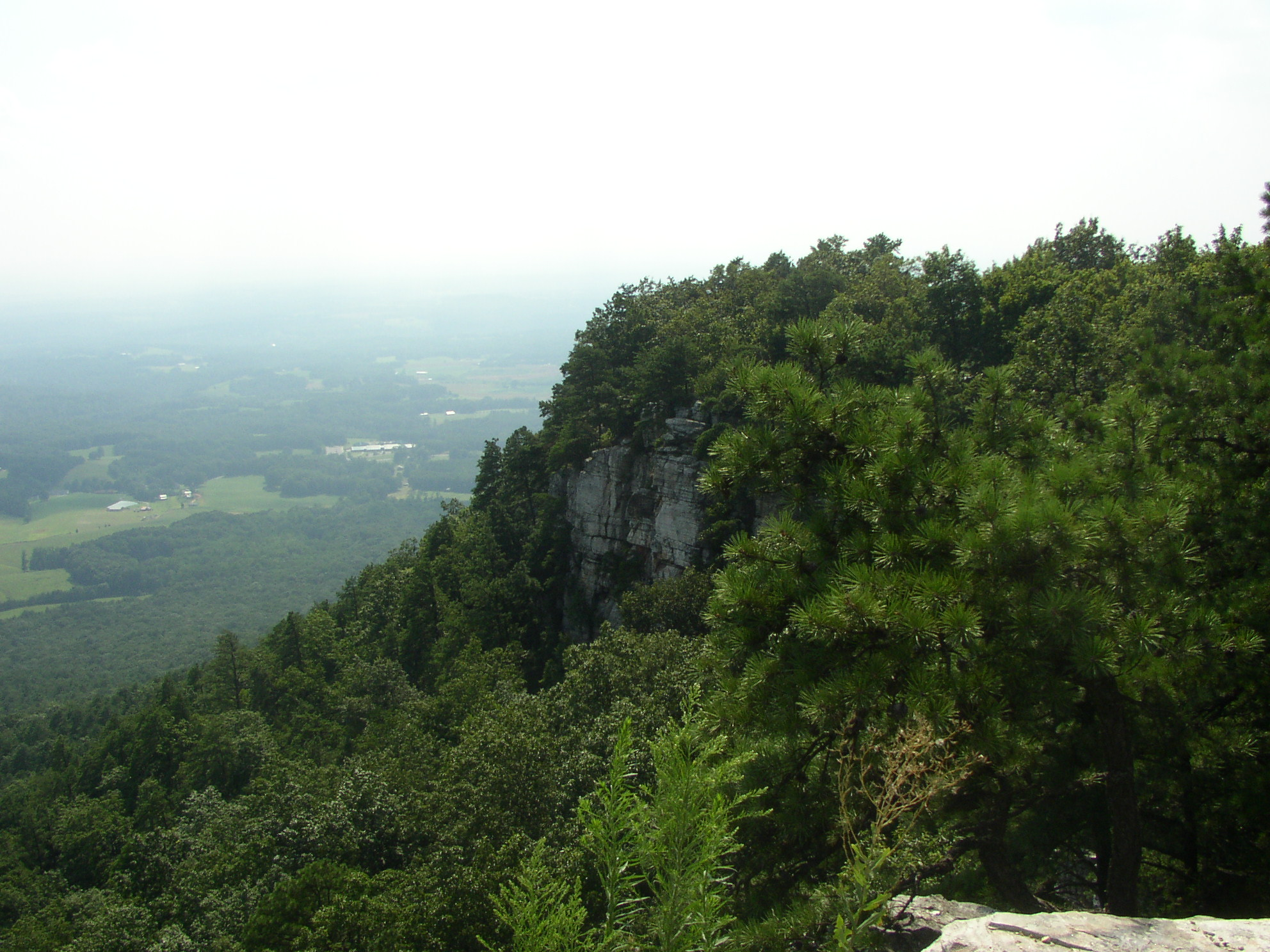
View along the ridge with typical cliffs on the south side.

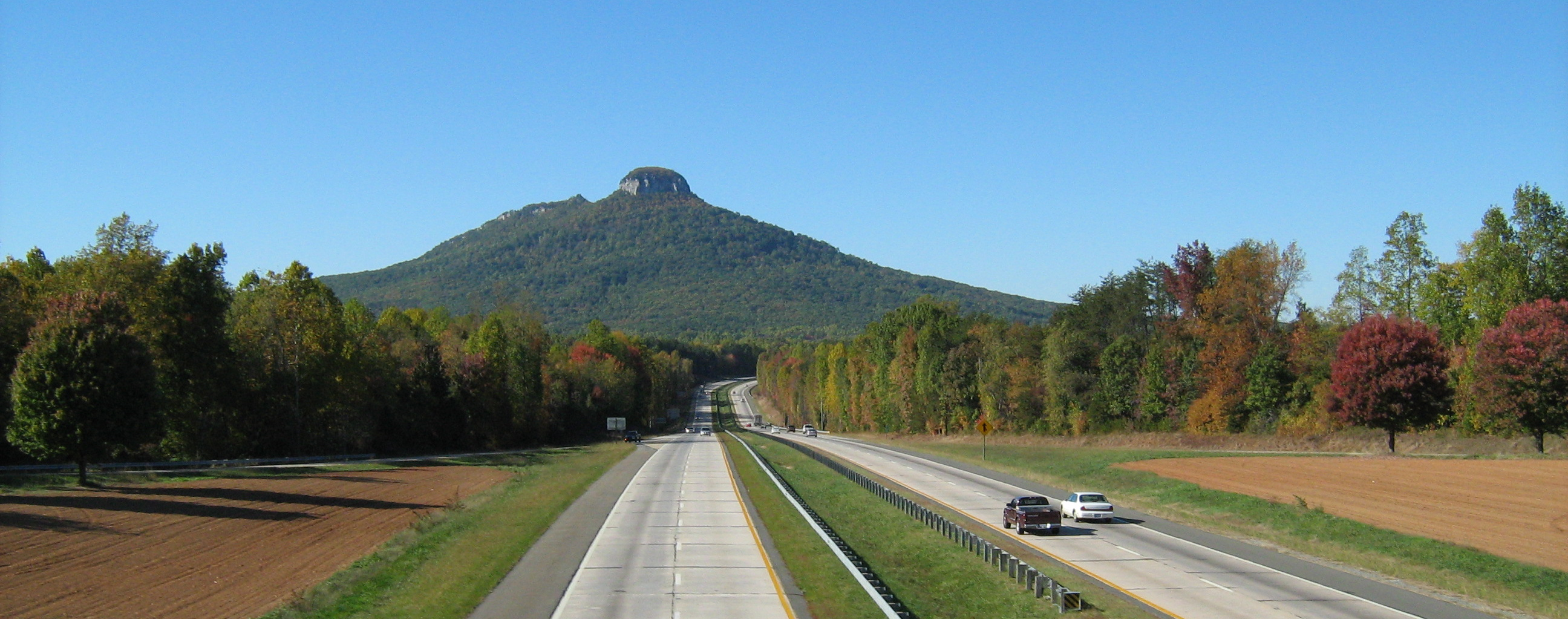
Pilot Mountain from the south on U.S. Route 52
