= Moore's Knob =

Mountain in North Carolina, United States

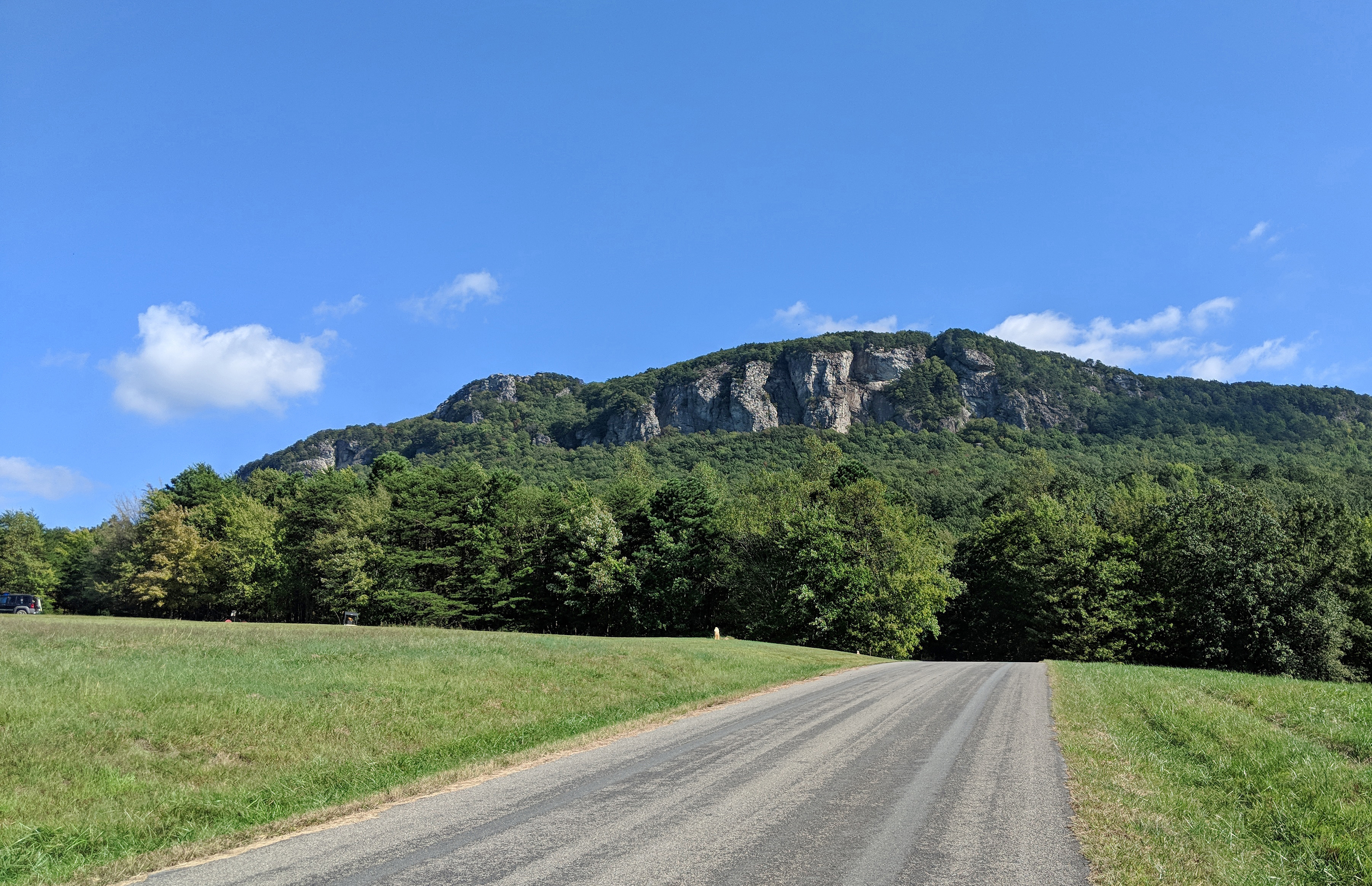

Highest point
- Elevation: 2,579 ft (786 m)
- Coordinates: 36°23′53″N 80°16′58″W

Geography
- Location within North Carolina
- Location: Stokes County, North Carolina
- Parent range: Sauratown Mountains

Climbing
- Easiest route: Hike

Moore's Knob is the highest mountain in the Sauratown Mountains of Stokes County, North Carolina. The Sauratown Mountains are an isolated remnant of the much larger Blue Ridge Mountains far to the west and north. A rugged, deeply eroded range, the Sauras feature dramatic rock cliffs which can be seen for miles. Moore's Knob has an elevation of 2,579 feet (786 meters) above sea level.

Moore's Knob sharply rises more than 1,700 feet (520 m) above the surrounding countryside, and it dominates the scenery of Stokes County from almost every direction. The mountain's north side contains Moore's Wall, a huge rock cliff over 400 feet (120 m) in height; the cliff is a favorite destination of rock climbers. The top of the mountain contains an abandoned fire lookout tower; hikers who climb the tower are rewarded with sweeping views of the surrounding countryside and Sauratown mountain range. On a clear day it is possible to see the skyscrapers of Winston-Salem, North Carolina to the south, the uniquely shaped Pilot Mountain some 12 miles (19 km) to the west, and the lofty front ridges of the Blue Ridge Mountains far to the west and north. The Greensboro skyline is visible even at 40 miles away to the east. Moore's Knob is contained within Hanging Rock State Park, and the park maintains a number of hiking and climbing trails on the mountain.
