= Doughton Park =

Park in North Carolina, United States

Coordinates: 36.401803°N 81.170797°W

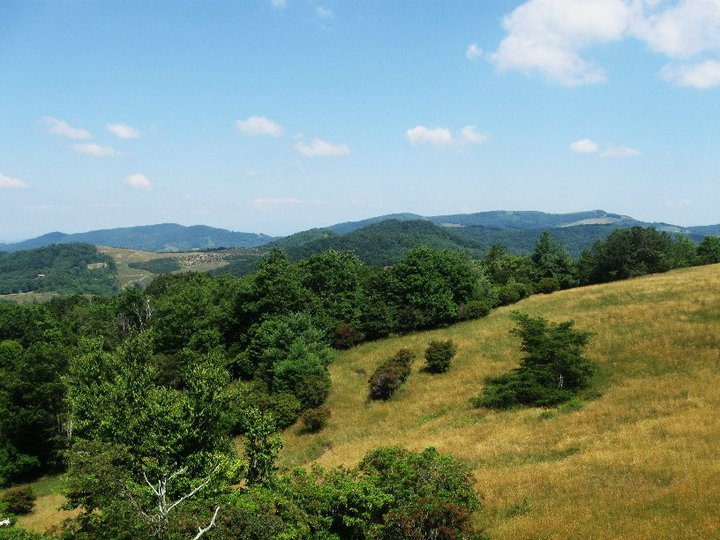

Doughton Park (Doughton Recreational Area) is the largest recreation area the National Park Service manages on the Blue Ridge Parkway. It is located between mile markers 238.5 - 244.7 on the border between Wilkes and Alleghany Counties in North Carolina. Doughton Park consists of highland meadows with numerous scenic overlooks, miles of hiking and bridle trails, areas for camping and cookouts, and it is one of the few areas on the Parkway that has a restaurant (called The Bluffs) along with an adjacent visitors center maintained by the National Park Service. Elevations in Doughton Park generally range from 3,500 to 4,000 feet (1,100 to 1,200 m). The park is named after North Carolina politician Robert L. Doughton, who lived in nearby Laurel Springs, North Carolina and who as a US Congressman played a key role in the creation of the Blue Ridge Parkway in the 1930s.

== Trails ==
The park contains over 30 miles of trails:

Basin Creek Trail: Accessible only from the Grassy Gap Fire Road, the 3.3-mile (5.3 km) trail winds past cascading waterfalls to the century-old Caudill Cabin, former home of the Martin Caudill family. Part of the once thriving Basin Cove community, this cabin was one of the few structures that withstood the devastating 1916 flood.

The hike to and from Caudill Cabin is an all-day hike, so hikers should allow plenty of time. If hiking from the Grassy Gap Fire Road trailhead on Longbottom Road (see below), plan on 4 hours to hike to the cabin and 3 hours to hike back to your car.

Bluff Mountain Trail: The moderate 7.5-mile (12.1 km) trail offers many scenic vistas and traverses relatively level terrain. The trail runs near the Parkway and is accessible from many locations along its route from Brinegar Cabin to Basin Cove Overlook.

Bluff Ridge Primitive Trail: At 2.8 miles (4.5 km), this is the park's shortest but steepest route into Basin Cove, from the Parkway. The very strenuous climb up the trail makes the hike seem much longer than it is.

Cedar Ridge Trail: Beginning near Brinegar Cabin, the trail descends a forested ridgeline 4.4 miles (7.1 km) to the Grassy Gap Fire Road, as it skirts the northern side of Doughton Park's "V-shaped" boundary. The elevation change is more than 2,000 feet.

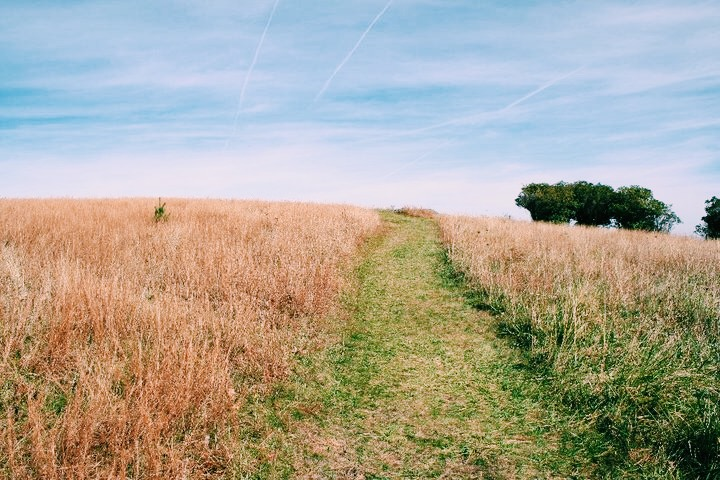

Flat Rock Ridge Trail: The 5-mile (8.0 km) trail begins on the mountain-top meadow at Basin Cove Overlook and ends on the damp, cool banks of Basin Cove Creek alongside the Grassy Gap Fire Road. The Trail offers glimpses of rugged mountain slopes that attracted and challenged early settlers.

Fodder Stack Trail: This 2-mile (3.2 km) round trip hike, shows off its delicate display of wildflowers in spring and rewards hikers year-round with the varied hues and fragrances of mixed pine and hardwood forest. Most of the trail is easy to moderate, with a short steep section at the start. The trail represents a cross-section of Parkway environments.

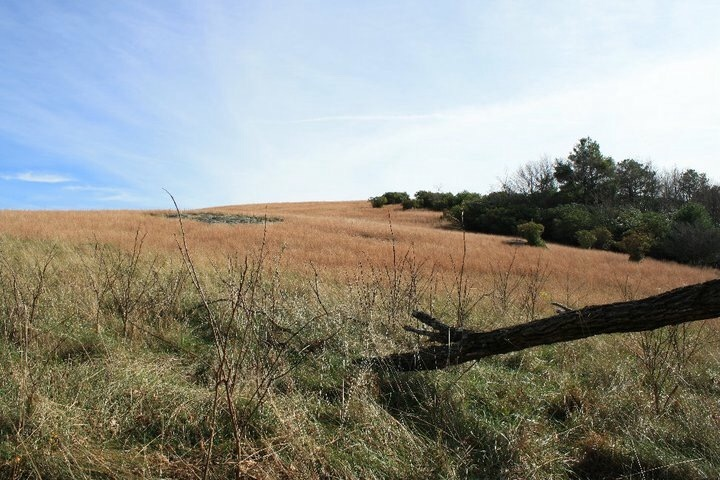

Grassy Gap Fire Road: This old fire road is a 6.5-mile (10.5 km) leaf-covered lane, wide enough for hikers or horseback riders to travel side-by-side. The trail starts at Milepost 243.9 and ambles down the mountainside past the primitive campground to Longbottom Road (SR 1730). This is the only trail in the park open to horseback riders, and they must enter and exit the park from Longbottom Road.

The trail access from Longbottom Road is a convenient place to begin hikes on several of these trails, though it can be difficult to find. Exit the Parkway at Milepost 248.1 and drive 5.9 miles along NC 18 towards North Wilkesboro. Turn left onto the paved road across from two old white buildings (this road is supposedly NC 1728, aka Longbottom Road, though there may not be a sign) and drive 6.3 miles until you cross a small bridge across Basin Creek. The parking area is on the right side of the road and the trail access is on the left.

Mountains-to-Sea Trail: Commonly called the MST, this long-distance trail passes through the park, as it transverses North Carolina from the Great Smoky Mountains to the Outer Banks. The MST runs concurrently with the Bluff Mountain Trail for most of its length through the park.

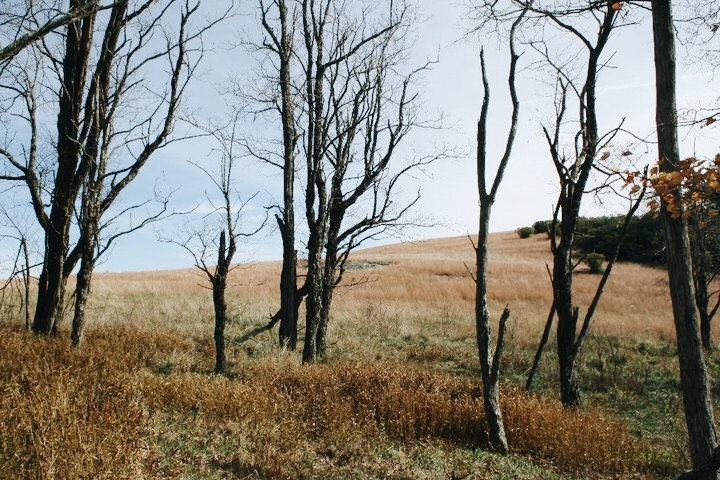

== Caudill Cabin ==
The main attraction is the remains of an old homestead located in the base of the valley.
