= Sauratown Mountains =

Mountain range in North Carolina

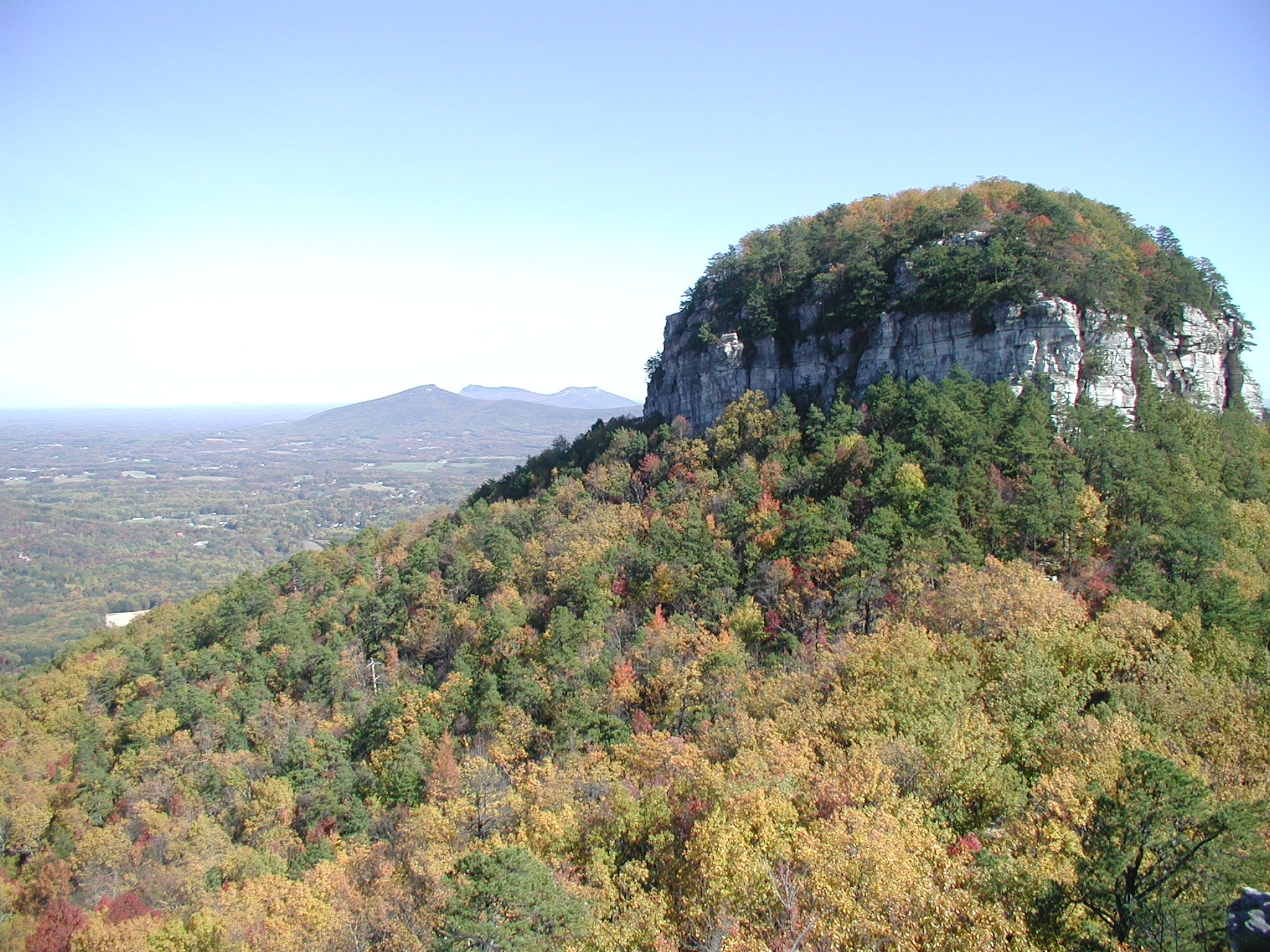
A view of the range looking east. Showing from left to right, Sauratown Mountain, Moore's Knob, Cooks Wall, and Pilot Mountain.

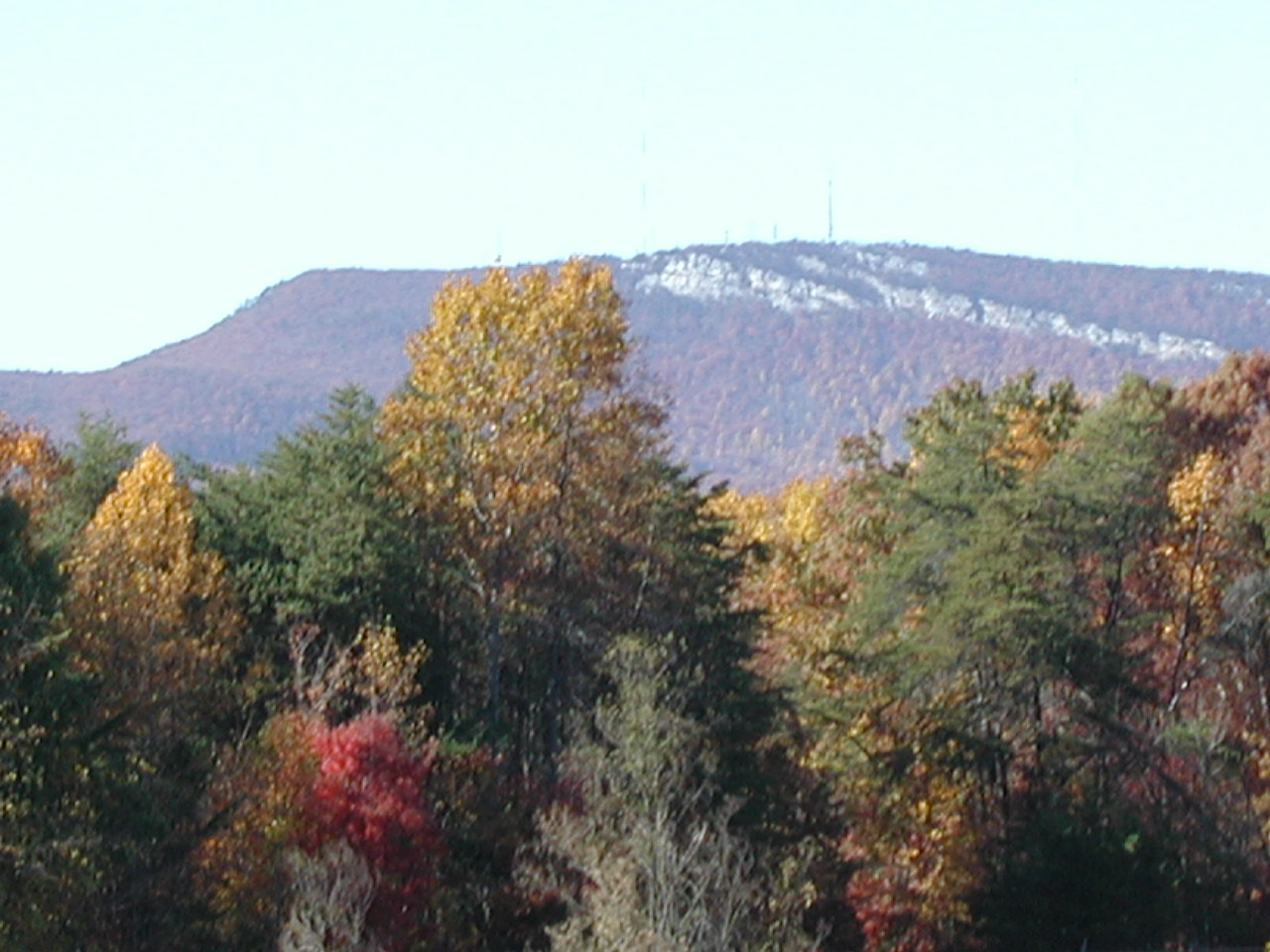
Sauratown Mountain

The Sauratown Mountains, which are sometimes called "the mountains away from the mountains", are an isolated mountain range located within Stokes and Surry counties in the U.S. state of North Carolina. The vast majority of the range is located in Stokes County. Although the range occupies only 5% of Stokes County's area, it dominates the county's scenery from almost every direction. The Sauras rise sharply 800 to 1,700 feet (244 to 518 meters) above the surrounding terrain.

The Sauratown Mountains were named after the Saura, a Native American tribe that lived near the mountains before European colonists arrived in the early 18th century. The range consists of rugged, heavily forested ridges frequently broken by large quartzite rock cliffs that can be seen for miles. The Sauratown Mountains are known for offering some of the best rock climbing in North Carolina. The highest point in the Sauratown Mountains is Moore's Knob, which rises to 2,579 feet (786 m). South Stokes High School, a local high school located south of the mountains in Walnut Cove, has the Saura Indian as their mascot.

The range is home to Hanging Rock State Park, which was formed in 1936 and contains Moore's Knob and other prominent peaks. From 1935 to 1942, the Civilian Conservation Corps, a New Deal agency, built a dam and 12-acre (49,000 m^{2}) lake in the park, as well as hiking and climbing trails and picnic and campground areas.

Uniquely shaped Pilot Mountain is also located in the range. Pilot Mountain State Park encompasses the westernmost end of the range. A hiking and bridle trail, known as the Sauratown Trail, crosses the range and interconnects the two state parks. The Mountains-to-Sea Trail follows the Sauratown Trail and passes through both parks.

== Peaks ==
A map of the Sauratown Mountain Range, showing the relative locations of the 12 notable peaks.

Peak name	Elevation	Coordinates	Protected area	County	Remarks
Stony Ridge	1,361 feet (415 m)	36°17′36″N 80°30′14″W	Pilot Mountain State Park	Surry	The Corridor Trail is the closest access to the summit, but it does not go to the summit.
Pilot Mountain	2,421 feet (738 m)	36°20′24″N 80°28′27″W	Pilot Mountain State Park	Surry	The mountain's Saura name is Jomeokee. The summit area is off limits to the general public, and it is only physically accessible via rock climbing. The highest point people can get to in the park is the Little Pinnacle, a false summit.
Black Mountain	1,447 feet (441 m)	36°21′36″N 80°27′05″W	Privately owned	Surry	The small mountain is northeast of Pilot Mountain, near the county line.
Sauratown Mountain	2,441 feet (744 m)	36°22′28″N 80°22′17″W	Privately owned	Stokes	Because it is a major radio communications site, there is no public access to Sauratown Mountain. A gated, private road ends a short distance from the summit.
Brown Mountain	1,550 feet (470 m)	36°27′14″N 80°20′21″W	Privately owned	Stokes	The mountain is north of Sauratown Mountain.
Ruben Mountain	1,817 feet (554 m)	36°23′13″N 80°18′44″W	Hanging Rock State Park	Stokes	Ruben is in between Sauratown Mountain and Hanging Rock. The Ruben Mountain Trail passes nearby the summit.
Devils Chimney	2,396 feet (730 m)	36°22′52″N 80°17′29″W	Hanging Rock State Park	Stokes	The Cook's Wall Trail ends near the summit.
Cooks Wall Mountain	2,346 feet (715 m)	36°22′44″N 80°17′15″W	Hanging Rock State Park	Stokes	The Cook's Wall Trail passes close by the summit.
Moore's Knob	2,579 feet (786 m)	36°23′53″N 80°16′58″W	Hanging Rock State Park	Stokes	The highest point in the range. The Moore's Wall Loop Trail, a part of the Mountains-to-Sea Trail, provides access to an old fire tower on top of the knob.
Wolf Rock	2,024 feet (617 m)	36°23′11″N 80°16′01″W	Hanging Rock State Park	Stokes	The Wolf Rock Loop Trail crosses over this sub-summit.
Hanging Rock Mountain	2,160 feet (660 m) †	36°23′52″N 80°15′06″W	Hanging Rock State Park	Stokes	The Hanging Rock Trail makes the closest approach to the summit but does not go to it. The trail ends at the top of the Hanging Rock, which is below the true summit.
Flat Shoals Mountain	1,660 feet (510 m) †	36°22′38″N 80°13′22″W	Hanging Rock State Park	Stokes	There are no park trails on this mountain.
† Approximate elevation.
