= Sauratown Trail =

Trail in North Carolina, United States

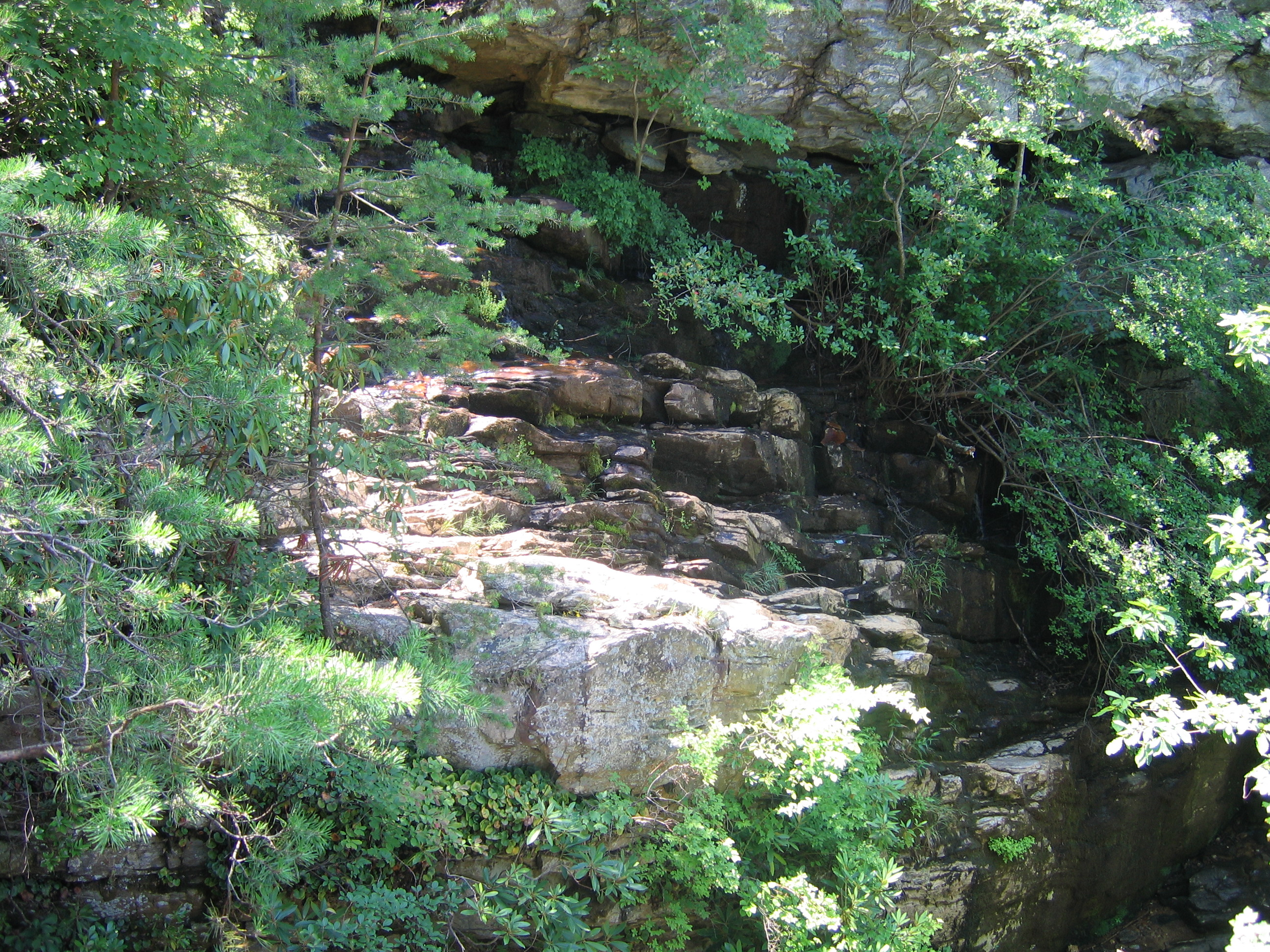
- Tory's Falls is located near the Sauratown Trail's eastern terminus. It is only accessible to hikers.
- Length: 22.2 mi (35.7 km) main route 33.1 mi (53.3 km) with spurs
- Location: North Carolina, United States
- Designation: Mountains-to-Sea Trail
- Trailheads: Surry Line, Pilot Mountain State Park; Old-Winston/Coon Road; Brim's Grove; Sauratown Trails Center; Tory's Den, Hanging Rock State Park
- Use: Hiking, Horseback riding
- Elevation change: 600 ft (180 m)
- Highest point: Tory's Den Trail-head (Ruben Mountain, if including spurs.)
- Lowest point: South Double Creek
- Difficulty: Moderate
- Season: Year-round, except hunting season
- Months: January through October
- Sights: Sauratown Mountains; Rural farms Streams; Small waterfalls
- Hazards: Tick-borne diseases Mosquitos; Yellowjackets; Biting flies Venomous snakes
- Surface: natural & gravel
- Website: http://www.sauratowntrails.org/

Sauratown Trail is a hiking and bridle trail in Stokes and Surry counties, North Carolina, which crosses the Sauratown Mountains and interconnects Pilot Mountain State Park and Hanging Rock State Park. It is the only bridle trail which goes between two NC State Parks. The trail is located primarily on leased, privately owned lands, and it is the longest publicly open trail on private lands in the state. The trail consists of a main trail of 22.2 miles (35.7 km) and two spur loops each about 6 miles (9.7 km) around. Altogether, the Sauratown Trail and its spurs total over 30 miles (48 km) of trail. The trail was dedicated by the Sauratown Trail Committee in October 1979. Since 2002, most of the main trail has been designated a part of the Mountains-to-Sea Trail.

The Sauratown Trails Association was founded in 1988 to succeed the Sauratown Trail Committee, and it created the current trail's route and its spurs. The volunteer group is primarily responsible for the trail's maintenance and continued existence.

== Spur Trails ==
- The James Booth Loop is a spur trail which loops around on land owned by James Booth, a Stokes County Commissioner supportive of the trails. It is 4.9 miles (7.9 km) long, round trip from the Tory's Den trail head.
- The Sauratown Loop is a spur trail that loops around the northern slope of Ruben Mountain. It is mostly within Hanging Rock State Park, and it is 6.0 miles (9.7 km) long, round trip from the Tory's Den trail head.

== Former Spurs ==
- The Wondest Tucker Loop was a spur trail that looped around forested lands near Vade Mecum Creek, and it offered access to a small cave. The loop was 3.2 miles (5.1 km) around, and it was 7.1 miles (11.4 km) round trip from the Tory's Den trail head. The loop was permanently closed in late November 2009.
