= Jockey's Ridge State Park =

State park in North Carolina, United States

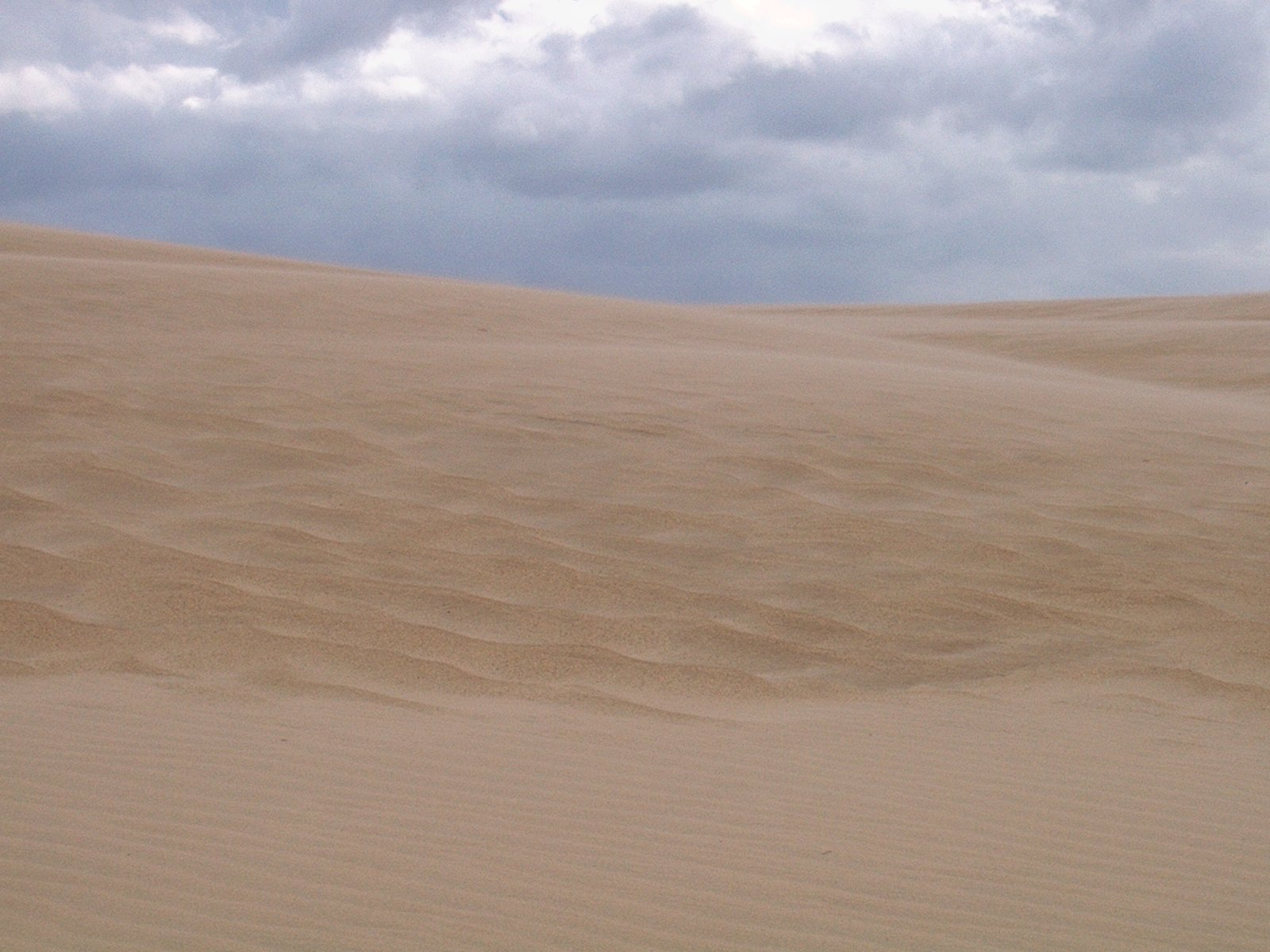
- A sand dune at Jockey's Ridge State Park

- Location within North Carolina Location within the United States
- Interactive map of Jockey's Ridge State Park
- Location: Dare County, North Carolina, United States
- Coordinates: 35°57′51″N 75°37′59″W
- Area: 427 acres (173 ha)
- Elevation: 100 ft (30 m)
- Established: 1975
- Administrator: North Carolina Division of Parks and Recreation
- Website: Official website

U.S. National Natural Landmark
- Designated: 1974

Jockey's Ridge State Park is a North Carolina state park in Dare County, North Carolina in the United States. Located in Nags Head, North Carolina, it covers a 427-acre (1.73 km^{2}) area, and includes the tallest active sand dune system in the eastern United States. The park is a day-use only park and has no campgrounds. Jockey's Ridge contains three unique ecosystems: the Roanoke Sound, the dune system, and the maritime forest. Often when it rains, water collects near the bottom of the dunes creating temporary ponds known as vernal pools. Few fauna can be seen around the dunes, although some types of flora, such as tall grass, may be seen near the bottom of the dunes.

The park is open year-round, except Christmas Day, and does not charge an admission, parking, or program fee. The park's entrance is located at Milepost 12 on S. Croatan Highway/US 158. Ranger-led programs are offered throughout the year. Also, available are nature trails, a sound access, and picnic areas. Viewing the sunset over the sound, bird watching, and kite-flying are among the favorite activities of visitors. The park also provides outside bathrooms that are typically open from the last frost of the spring to the first frost of the fall.

During the summer months, when visitation is highest, visitors are encouraged to bring water with them. There is no fresh water available within the park. The desert-like environment can be quite harsh and temperatures can reach 110 degrees; the sand can be 30 degrees hotter.

The park's visitor center features a museum about the cultural and natural history of the park, including sand dunes, plants and wildlife, weather, pirates and local maritime history. A hang-gliding school provides concessionaire hang-gliding lessons in the park. The ridge area is accessed either from the back deck of the visitor center or the parking lot via a 350-foot-long (110 m) boardwalk. Sandboarding is also practiced on the dunes.

== History ==
Scientists believe that the barrier islands of the Outer Banks were remnants of the last ice age, which ended approximately 12,000 years ago. They have also concluded that Jockey's Ridge itself came into being about 7,000 years ago. The process of how this came about is unclear; however, scientists believe that minerals such as quartz were washed from the mountains of the state to the ocean, creating sand. This sand was pushed onto the beaches of the area by storms and hurricanes. Through a process known as saltation the sand was eventually blown onto the area now known as Jockey's Ridge where something caused it to begin building the dune system.

At one time, the dunes of the Outer Banks extended all the way to the southern end of Virginia. Many mariners used the ridge as a landmark in navigation of the area for coastal exploration in the 16th century.

By the early 20th century, the Outer Banks had become a popular tourist area for visitors from the mainland. This in turn led to overdevelopment of the land. As development in the area proceeded, many local people desired the protection of the dune area. Action was precipitated in the summer of 1973, when bulldozing was begun on the sound side of Jockey's Ridge. Carolista Baum, a local resident, was made aware of the bulldozing by her children who were playing in the area. She confronted the operator of the machine and successfully demanded that it be shut down. Petitions soon began in an effort to "Save Our Sand Dune," and the organization "People to Preserve Jockey's Ridge" was formed.

On July 25, 1974, Jockey's Ridge was approved for designation as a National Natural Landmark (see Nags Head Woods and Jockey Ridge NNL). With matching funds from the North Carolina General Assembly and the United States Bureau of Outdoor Recreation, approximately 152 acres (0.62 km^{2}) were acquired in 1975 to create Jockey's Ridge State Park.

=== Name origin ===
There are numerous theories of how the ridge came to be known as Jockey's Ridge. An early reference to "Jockey's Hill" appeared in a grant to John Campbell in 1753. A 1953 U.S. Geographical Survey Map identified the area as Jackey's Ridge, suggesting that a family named Jackey or Jacock owned the area at one time. One popular legend concerning the naming of Jockey's Ridge results from the "Bankers" practice of capturing and racing Spanish Mustangs. The herd of horses came from the ships of explorers wrecked offshore. Riders, or jockeys, used the flats at the base of the big dune as the race course. The steep sides of the ridge served as a grandstand for spectators to view the race.

=== Shoreline restoration project ===
In 2008, Jockey's Ridge partnered with the North Carolina Coastal Federation, The Nature Conservancy, and the North Carolina Division of Marine Fisheries to build a natural oyster bulkhead along the northwestern edge of the park. The purpose of this project was twofold: to restore and stabilize shoreline along the sound, and to encourage new oyster growth in the waters. Now completed, the project has used nearly 4,000 bushels of recycled oyster shells.

=== Wind turbine ===
In 2010, the park became the first state park in North Carolina to harness the wind's energy with a wind turbine. The 10 kW turbine helps offset power consumption, producing approximately 700-900 kWh/month. Funding for the project came from the North Carolina Parks and Recreation Trust Fund.

== Ecosystems ==
=== Jockey's Ridge ===
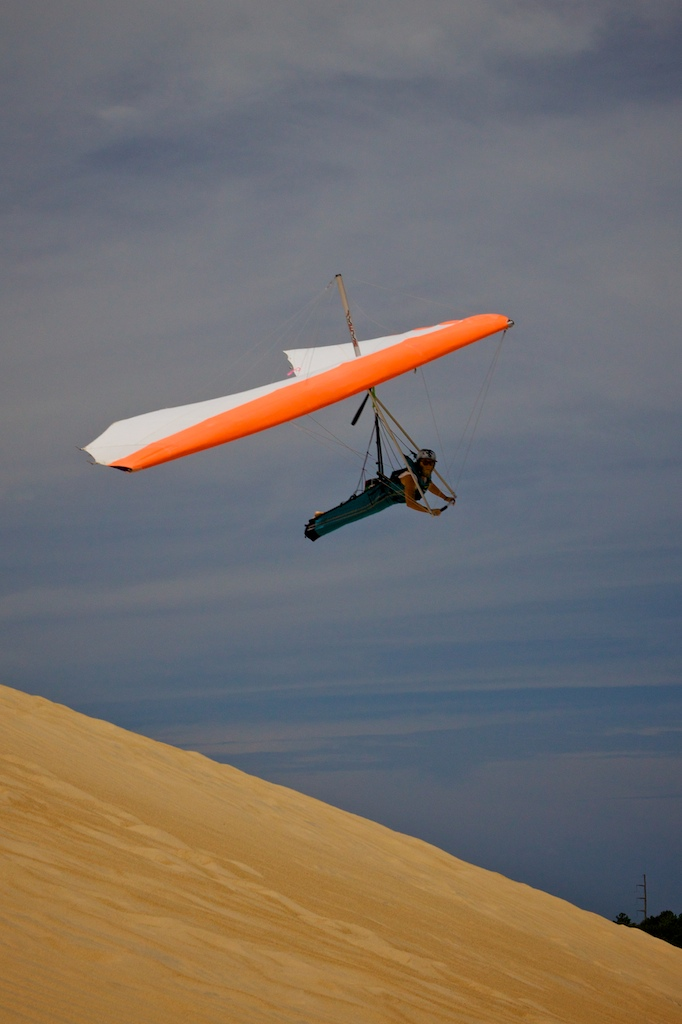
Hang gliding is a popular activity due to the large sand dunes and wind from the Atlantic Ocean.

The tall dune area of Jockey's Ridge is known as a medano—a massive, asymmetrical, shifting hill of sand lacking vegetation. The desert-like environment of the dunes makes life difficult here with little to no vegetation or animal life in this area. The notorious winds of the Outer Banks cause a continual shifting of sands on the dunes. Winter's northeastern winds blow stronger than summer's southwestern winds, causing the dunes to move about one to six feet to the southwest each year. The dune is, however, stabilized somewhat by the surrounding maritime forests. Scientists estimate that there are 30 million tons of sand in the park.

=== Maritime forest ===
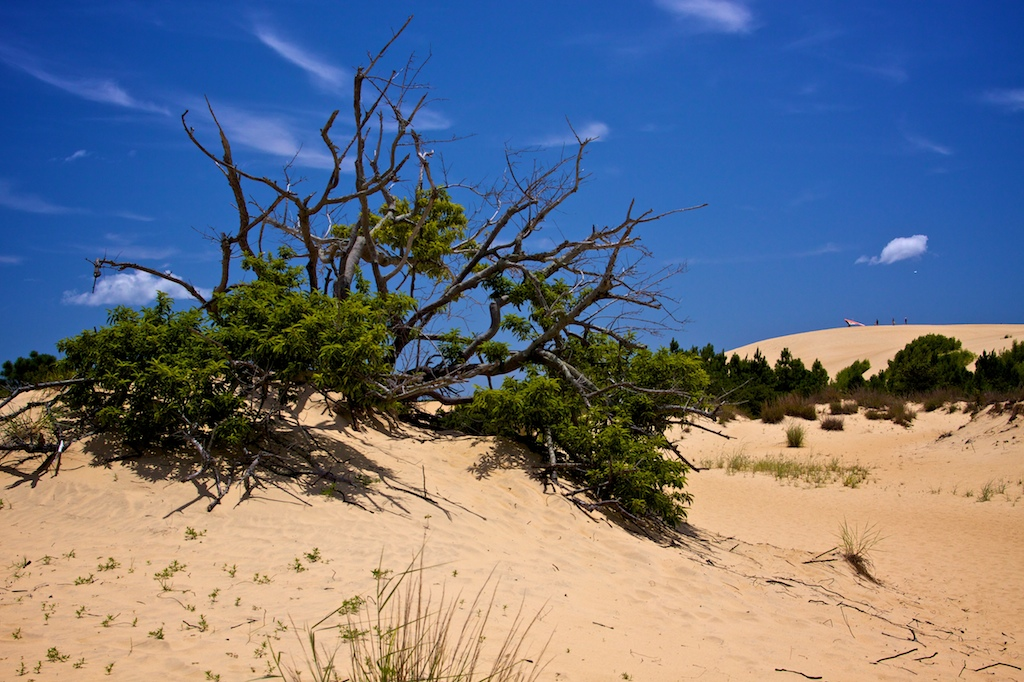
Brush growing on some of the sand dunes of Jockey's Ridge State Park.

The maritime forest is the home to most plant and animal life in the park. The forests help to stabilize the dune and in return the dune protects the forests from strong winds and harsh salt spray.

==== Flora ====
There are many species of plants that have specialized to living on the Outer Banks. Live oaks are synonymous with the southeastern U.S. and are one of the most hardy species of tree. Shrub thickets dominated by southern wax myrtle, eastern redcedar, live oak, and redbay (Persea borbonia) are found in protected dune pockets and near the picnic area. To the west of the dunes is a forest that consists of live and southern red oaks, hickory, American sweetgum, and loblolly pine; dogwood, sassafras, and other small trees form a subcanopy.

==== Fauna ====
Many of the animals living in Jockey's Ridge have adapted to the environment. Most of them are nocturnal to combat the summer heat, so visitors don't see them. The animals do leave unmistakable clues behind: their tracks. Some of the more interesting creatures to inhabit the park are the gray fox, six-lined racerunner, Virginia opossum, tiger beetle, eastern spadefoot toad, and antlion.

=== Roanoke Sound ===
The Roanoke is a shallow, brackish, estuarine body of water that separates Bodie Island from Roanoke Island. It remains shallow due to the same forces that created the ridge: winds blow sand from the dune area into the sound. It is able to act as a hatchery for many types of both freshwater and saltwater fishes due to its mostly calm waters. Croakers, shrimp, striped burrfish, pipefish, blue crabs, and seahorses have all been documented near the park. Many types of shorebirds are also present along the sound. Ospreys are one of the more fascinating sights during warmer months in the area.
