= Haw River State Park =

State park in North Carolina, U.S.

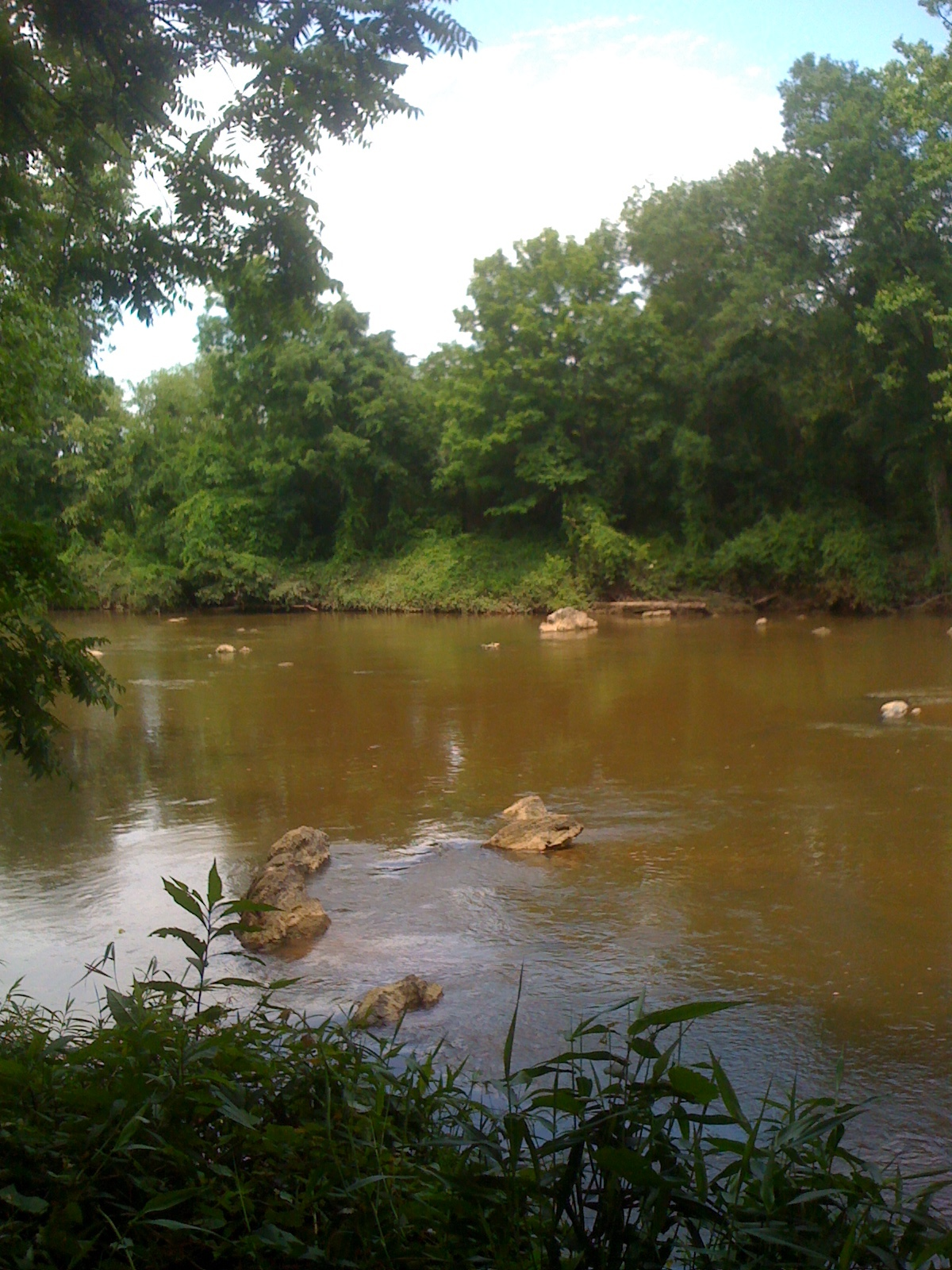
- Haw River

- Location within North Carolina Location within the United States
- Interactive map of Haw River State Park
- Location: Guilford and Rockingham counties, North Carolina, United States
- Coordinates: 36°15′02″N 79°45′23″W
- Area: 1,485 acres (601 ha)
- Elevation: 800 ft (240 m)
- Established: 2003
- Administrator: North Carolina Division of Parks and Recreation
- Website: Official website

Haw River State Park is a 1,485-acre (601 ha) North Carolina state park in Guilford and Rockingham counties, North Carolina, United States. Opened in 2003, it is located off North Carolina Highway 150 in Browns Summit. The park's primary focus is environmental education, and the state park houses the Summit Environmental Education Center. The park includes wetlands along the Haw River and oak-hickory forests characteristic of the North Carolina Piedmont.

== Environmental education ==
Environmental education is the central focus at Haw River State Park. The Summit Environmental Education Center is a retreat and educational facility operated by the North Carolina Division of Parks and Recreation. It was formerly a retreat center owned and operated by the Episcopal Diocese of North Carolina, who sold the property to the state. The center can house up to 180 overnight visitors in a motel and several dormitories. There are eight conference rooms, a cafeteria and indoor and outdoor recreational facilities with a 6-acre (2.4 ha) lake and hiking trails.

The Summit Environmental Education Center is used to educate employees of the state of North Carolina, including park rangers and public-school teachers. When the facilities are not in use by a state organization, outside organizations may use the facilities for staff retreats, family reunions, and business conferences.

== Ecology ==
Haw River State Park lies within the North Carolina Piedmont and is characterized by its riverine wetlands and oak-hickory forests. The park contains freshwater wetlands along the floodplains of the Haw River. These wetlands provide breeding habitats for amphibians, fish, and insects.

=== Fauna ===
According to the park's Natural Resource Inventory checklist, 155 bird species, 24 mammal species, 25 reptile species, 21 amphibian species, and 15 fish species have been sighted within the park. Of the 155 bird species within the park, 5 are known to nest within the park, and a further 42 are suspected of nesting within the park. Bird species that have been observed include great blue herons, Carolina wrens, northern cardinals, Canada geese, and Louisiana waterthrushes, a species used as an indicator of water quality and stream ecosystem integrity.

The forests of the park provide a habitat for mammals. Recorded species of mammals include coyotes, gray foxes, beavers, raccoons, eastern gray squirrels, eastern chipmunks, and bobcats.

=== Flora ===
The park forests are characteristic of the North Carolina Piedmont. Recorded tree species include northern red oak, white oak, flowering dogwood, and white hickory.

The park is home to a number of invasive species, such as Chinese privet and multiflora rosa, which threaten the local ecosystem. The park offers opportunities for volunteers to learn about invasive species and remove them from the park.

== Gallery ==
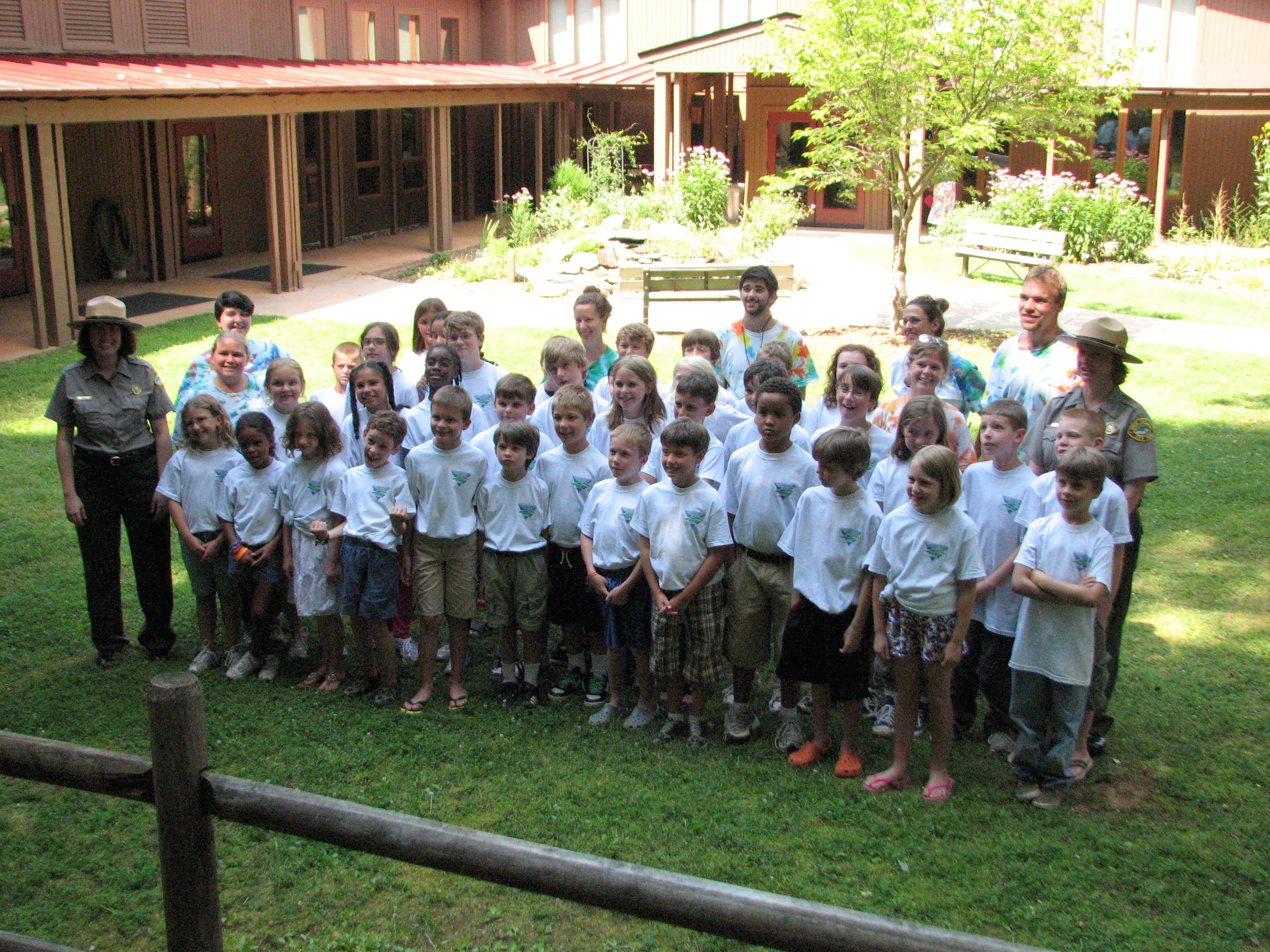
A Junior Ranger class in front of the Summit Center

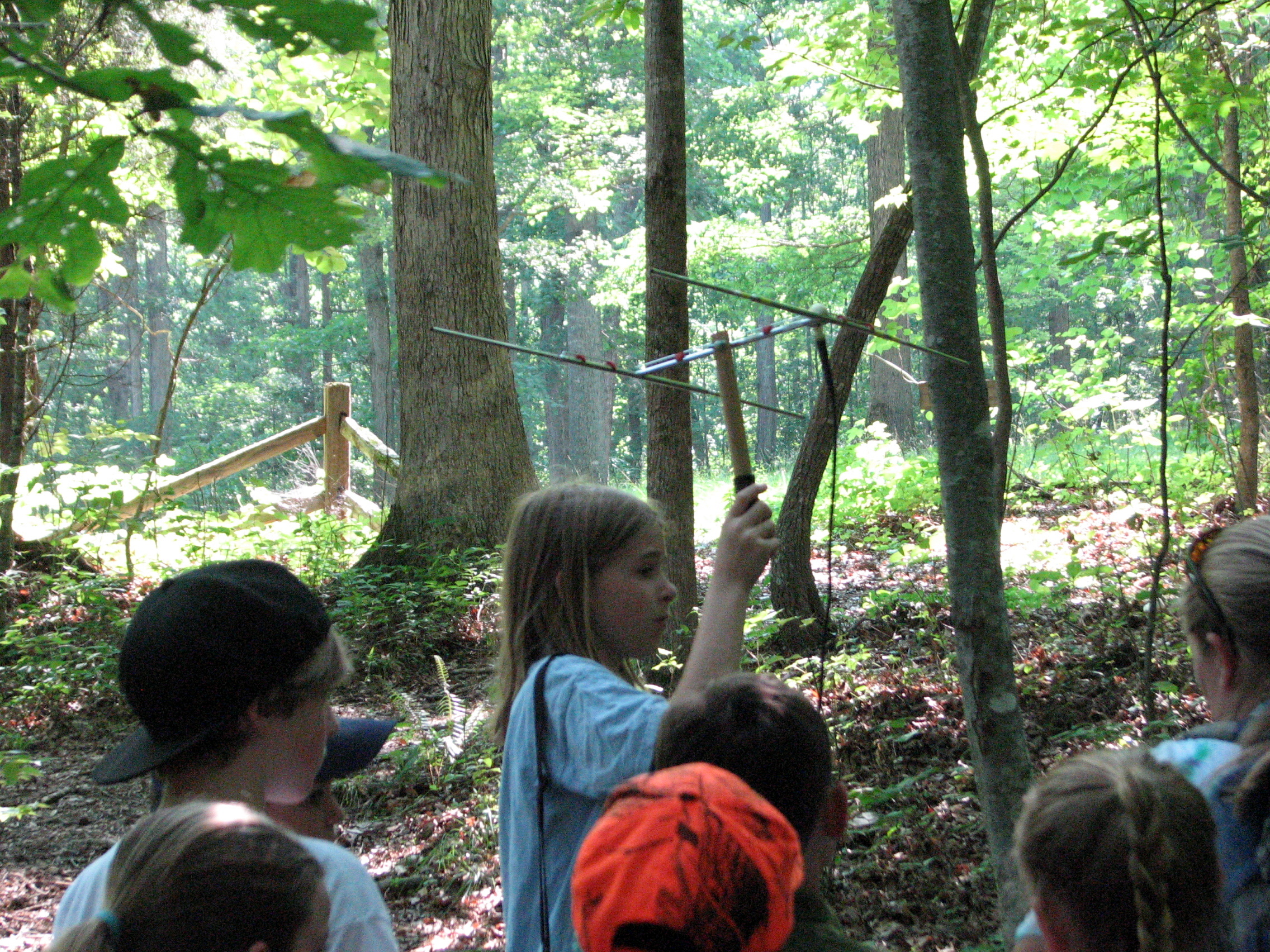
A girl learns how to track a radio tagged turtle
