= Alleghany County Schools =

School district in North Carolina, United States

Location
- Alleghany County, North Carolina United States

District information
- Type: Public
- Grades: PK–12
- Superintendent: Chad Beasley
- Asst. superintendent(s): Heath Vogler, Missey Weaver
- Accreditations: Southern Association of Colleges and Schools
- Schools: 4
- Budget: $ 18,301,000
- NCES District ID: 3700120

Students and staff
- Students: 1,558
- Teachers: 123.80 (on FTE basis)
- Staff: 118.20 (on FTE basis)
- Student–teacher ratio: 12.58:1

Other information
- Website: www.alleghany.k12.nc.us

Alleghany County Schools is the school district serving Alleghany County, North Carolina. Its four schools serve 1,558 students as of the 2010–11 school year.

== Student demographics ==
For the 2010–11 school year, Alleghany County Schools had a total population of 1,558 students and 123.80 teachers on a (FTE) basis. This produced a student-teacher ratio of 12.58:1. That same year, out of the student total, the gender ratio was 49% male to 51% female. The demographic group makeup was: White, 84%; Hispanic, 13%; Black, 1%; American Indian, 0%; and Asian/Pacific Islander, 0% (two or more races: 2%). For the same school year, 68.42% of the students received free and reduced-cost lunches.

== Governance ==
The primary governing body of Alleghany County Schools follows a council–manager government format with a five-member Board of Education appointing a Superintendent to run the day-to-day operations of the system. The school system currently resides in the North Carolina State Board of Education's Seventh District.

=== Board of education ===
The five-member Alleghany County Schools Board of Education meets on the second Tuesday of every month. The current members of the board are: Donna Rea (Chair), Amy Bottomley (Vice-Chair), Rick Wooten, Steve Carpenter, and Jason Williams.

=== Superintendent ===
The current superintendent is Dr. Chad Beasley, who has held the position since 2015.

== Member schools ==
Alleghany County Schools has four schools ranging from pre-kindergarten to twelfth grade. Those four schools are separated into one high school, and three elementary schools which handle the pre-k through eighth grades.

=== High school ===
- Alleghany High School (Sparta)

=== Elementary schools ===
- Glade Creek Elementary School (Ennice)
- Piney Creek Elementary School (Piney Creek)
- Sparta Elementary School (Sparta)

== See also ==
- List of school districts in North Carolina
