= List of Highway Historical Markers in Alleghany County, North Carolina =

Alleghany County, North Carolina is in District M of the NC Highway Historical Marker Program, and has four markers as of July 2020. The marker program was created by the North Carolina General Assembly in 1935. Since that time over 1600 black and silver markers have been placed along numbered North Carolina highways throughout the state. Each one has a brief description of a fact relevant to state history, and is located near a place related to that fact. North Carolina's counties are divided into seventeen districts for the highway marker program. Each marker is assigned an identifier that begins with the letter of the district, followed by a number.

List of North Carolina Highway Historical Markers in Alleghany County, NC
| Number | Title | Location | Text | Year Erected |
|---|---|---|---|---|
| M-14 | North Carolina-Virginia | NC 93 northwest of Piney Creek at NC/VA boundary. | "NORTH CAROLINA / Colonized, 1585-87, by first English settlers in America; permanently settled c. 1650; first to vote readiness for independence, Apr. 12, 1776 b/w VIRGINIA / First permanent English colony in America, 1607, one of thirteen original states. Richmond, the capital, was seat of Confederate government." | 1941 |
| M-34 | Robert L. Doughton 1863-1954 | NC 88 and NC 18 at Laurel Springs. | "Congressman, 1911-1953. Chairman, House Ways and Means Committee, 1933-1947, 1949-1953. Home 2/10 mi. S.E." | 1963 |
| M-37 | Rufus A. Doughton | US 21 (North Main Street) in Sparta. | "Legislator, 14 terms. Lt. Governor, 1893-1897. Headed Revenue & Highway Commissions. Was U.N.C. Trustee for 56 yrs. Office was 30 feet W." | 1966 |
| M-49 | Blue Ridge Parkway | Blue Ridge Parkway at Cumberland Knob. | "First rural national parkway. Construction began near here on September 11, 1935." | 1987 |
