= Glade Valley, North Carolina =

Unincorporated community in North Carolina, US

Coordinates: 36°28′18″N 81°03′05″W

Glade Valley is an unincorporated community located in Alleghany County, North Carolina, United States along U.S. Highway 21 between Cherry Lane and Sparta (Powell 1968, p. 384).

== Major attractions ==
A former private high school located here, Glade Valley High School, is now the Blue Ridge Christian school, and the former gymnasium has been converted to a music and event venue named Alexander Hall.

== Demographics ==
Glade Valley's Zip Code Tabulation Area (Zip Code 28627) has a population of 1,405 as of the 2000 census. The population is 49.5% male and 50.5% female. About 96.4% of the population is white, 2.6% Hispanic, 0.7% African-American, 0.5% American Indian, 0.3% Asian, and 1.5% other races. 0.6% of people are of mixed race. There are no native Hawaiians or other Pacific Islanders.

The median household income is $29,679 with 17.8% of the population living below the poverty line.
