= Lake Louise (Roaring Gap, North Carolina) =

Man-made lake in North Carolina, US

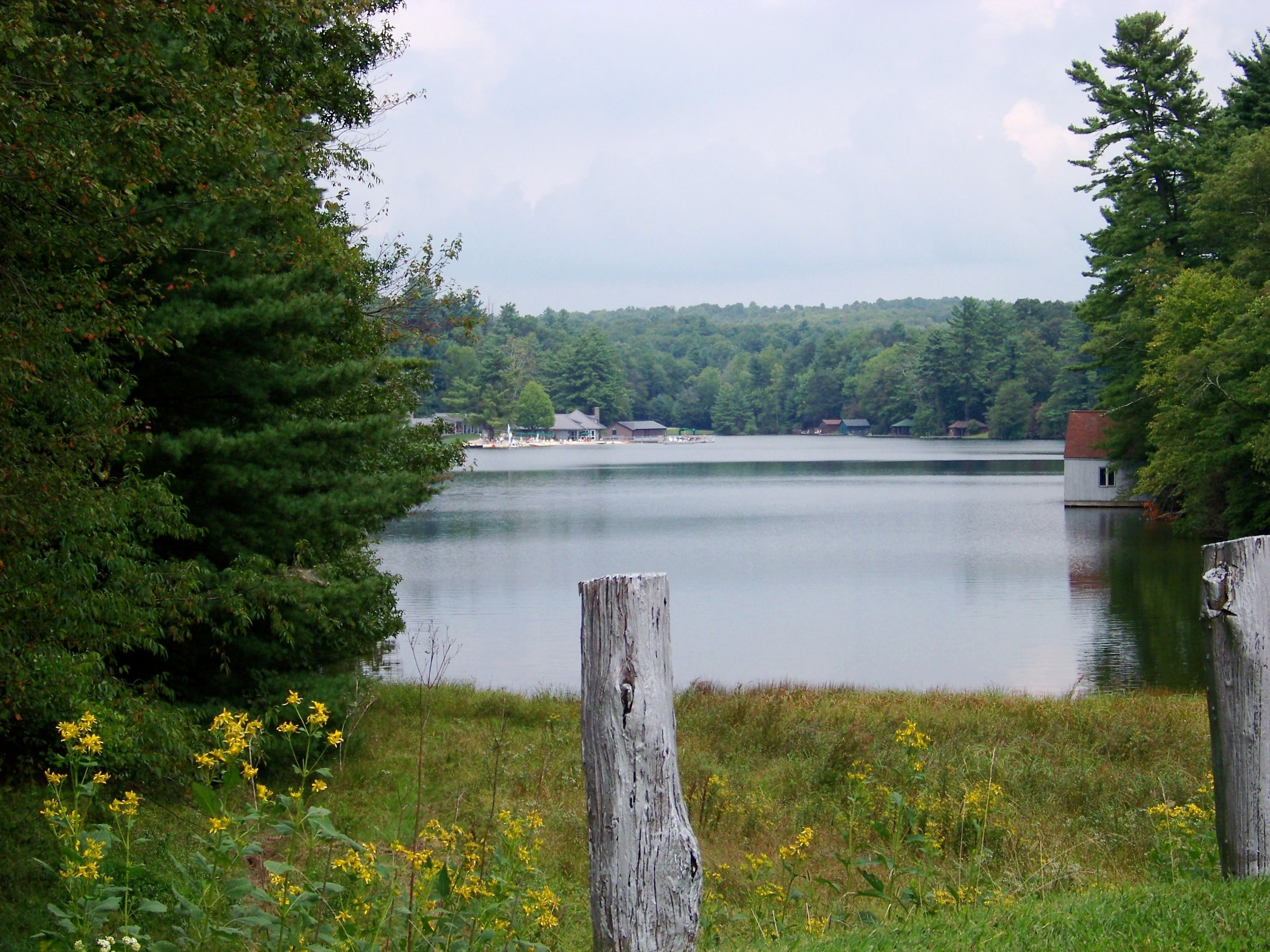
- Lake Louise in 2007.

- Location within North Carolina Location within the United States
- Location: Roaring Gap, Cherry Lane Township, Alleghany County, North Carolina, U.S.
- Coordinates: 36°24′5″N 80°58′55″W
- Lake type: reservoir
- Etymology: Louise Roth Bryan
- Primary inflows: Laurel Branch
- Basin countries: United States

Lake Louise, formerly known as Bullhead Lake, is a 54-acre reservoir in Roaring Gap, North Carolina. A man-made lake, it was formed between 1926 and 1927 in southeastern Alleghany County on the headwaters of Laurel Branch creek. Privately owned by the Roaring Gap Club, it was developed for residents and members for swimming, fishing, and boating.

== History ==
Lake Louise was created as part of the development of Roaring Gap, a golfing and resort community in the Cherry Lane Township of southeastern Alleghany County. It is a man-made lake spanning 54 acres used by the Roaring Gap Club for boating, fishing, and swimming. Laurel Branch stream was damned in 1926 to fill in the reservoir, which opened to club members in June of that year. The lake finished filling the following year, in 1927. The land used for Lake Louise was previously farmland owned by Rev. James Ralph Smith, a farmer who sold his property for the development of Roaring Gap Club and High Meadows Country Club. The lake was originally named Bullhead Lake but it was renamed Lake Louise by the Roaring Gap Club. Lake Louise is named after Louise Roth Bryan, the wife of Albert Othel Bryan.

In 1929 a girls' summer camp called Silver Pines was opened by the lake. Louise Boles of Greenwich, Connecticut served as the assistant head of water sports on the lake.

The reservoir is located 10.3 miles from Sparta.

A restaurant for members of the country club is located on one of the lake's beaches.
