= Boyden Carpenter =

American singer-songwriter

- Also known as: "The Original Hill Billy Kid"
- Born: Hildred Boyden Summit; February 26, 1909
- Origin: Fries, Virginia, US
- Died: May 25, 1995 (aged 86)
- Genres: Bluegrass, Bluegrass gospel, Hillbilly
- Occupation: Bluegrass artist
- Instrument: Guitar
- Years active: 1930s–1940s

Boyden Carpenter (1909–1995) was a hillbilly and bluegrass artist active in the 1930s and 1940s in the United States.

== Personal ==
Carpenter was born February 26, 1909, in Fries, Grayson County, Virginia, and was raised in Pipers Gap, Carroll County, Virginia and Sparta and Cherry Lane in Alleghany County, North Carolina. He died May 25, 1995, at Cherryville, Gaston County, North Carolina. Carpenter was his adopted surname—he was born to John W. and Mary E. Summit but was using his stepfather's surname by 1930.

== Musical career ==
In 1930, Carpenter was working in Winston-Salem, Forsyth County, North Carolina, as a musician in an orchestra. Billing himself as "The Hill Billy Kid," he began playing with several bands, including Wade Mainer's Sons of The Mountaineers, Bill Monroe's Monroe Brothers, and the Crazy Water Crystals-sponsored "Crazy Water Barn Dance" show band in Charlotte, North Carolina.

He had his greatest musical success in the mid-1930s working at WPTF radio station in Raleigh, North Carolina, touring with the "Grandfather of Bluegrass, Wade Mainer and his Sons of the Mountaineers band and Bill Monroe's Monroe Brothers, and playing with Ernest Thompson.

The William Leonard Eury Appalachian Collection at Appalachian State University in Boone, North Carolina, preserves a photograph of Carpenter with his guitar and "The 'Hill Billy' from Alleghany County" guitar case found in a book titled Boyden Carpenter: The Old Gospel Singer. A 1930s booklet entitled Boyden Carpenter: The Original "Hillbilly Kid", which relates his life story and lyrics to his songs, also survives.
