= Robert L. Doughton House =

Historic house in North Carolina, United States

- U.S. National Register of Historic Places
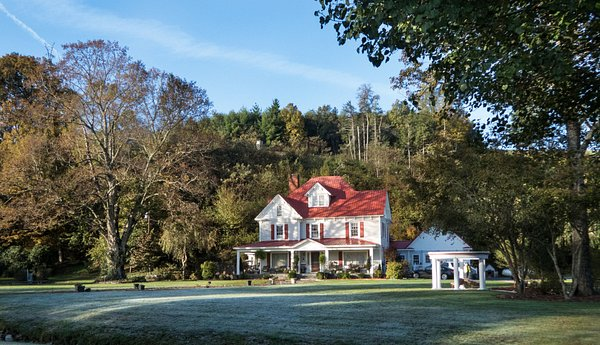

- Location within North Carolina Location within the United States
- Location: NC 18, Laurel Springs, North Carolina
- Coordinates: 36°24′38″N 81°15′55″W
- Area: 3.5 acres (1.4 ha)
- Built: 1899
- Architectural style: Queen Anne, Late Queen Anne
- NRHP reference No.: 79001656
- Added to NRHP: August 13, 1979

Robert L. Doughton House is a historic home located at Laurel Springs, Alleghany County, North Carolina It was built in 1899, and is a two-story frame farmhouse in a vernacular Queen Anne style influenced frame cottage. It features a steeply pitched hip roof, with a two-story, one-bay gable roof projection. It was the home of Robert L. Doughton (1863-1954), one of North Carolina's foremost politicians of the first of the 20th century. In the 1990s Rufus A. Doughton's house was restored, and it is now a popular bed-and-breakfast for tourists to the region.

It was listed on the National Register of Historic Places in 1979.
