= Jarvis House (Sparta, North Carolina) =

Historic house in North Carolina, United States

- U.S. National Register of Historic Places
- Location within North Carolina Location within the United States
- Location: N end NC 1439, N of jct. with NC 18, near Sparta, North Carolina
- Coordinates: 36°33′34″N 81°0′43″W
- Area: 1.2 acres (0.49 ha)
- Built: c. 1850, 1880s, c. 1900
- Built by: Jarvis, Ira
- Architectural style: Tri-gable I-house
- NRHP reference No.: 91001506
- Added to NRHP: October 16, 1991

Jarvis House, also known as the Ira Jarvis House, is a historic home located near Sparta, Alleghany County, North Carolina. Located on the property are the contributing log building known as the log house, erected before 1850; the two-story 1880s Ira Jarvis House; and a detached stone cellar added in the early 1900s. The Ira Jarvis House is a simple tri-gable balloon-frame I-house with a hall and parlor plan.

It was listed on the National Register of Historic Places in 1991.
