= William Weaver House =

Historic house in North Carolina, United States

- U.S. National Register of Historic Places
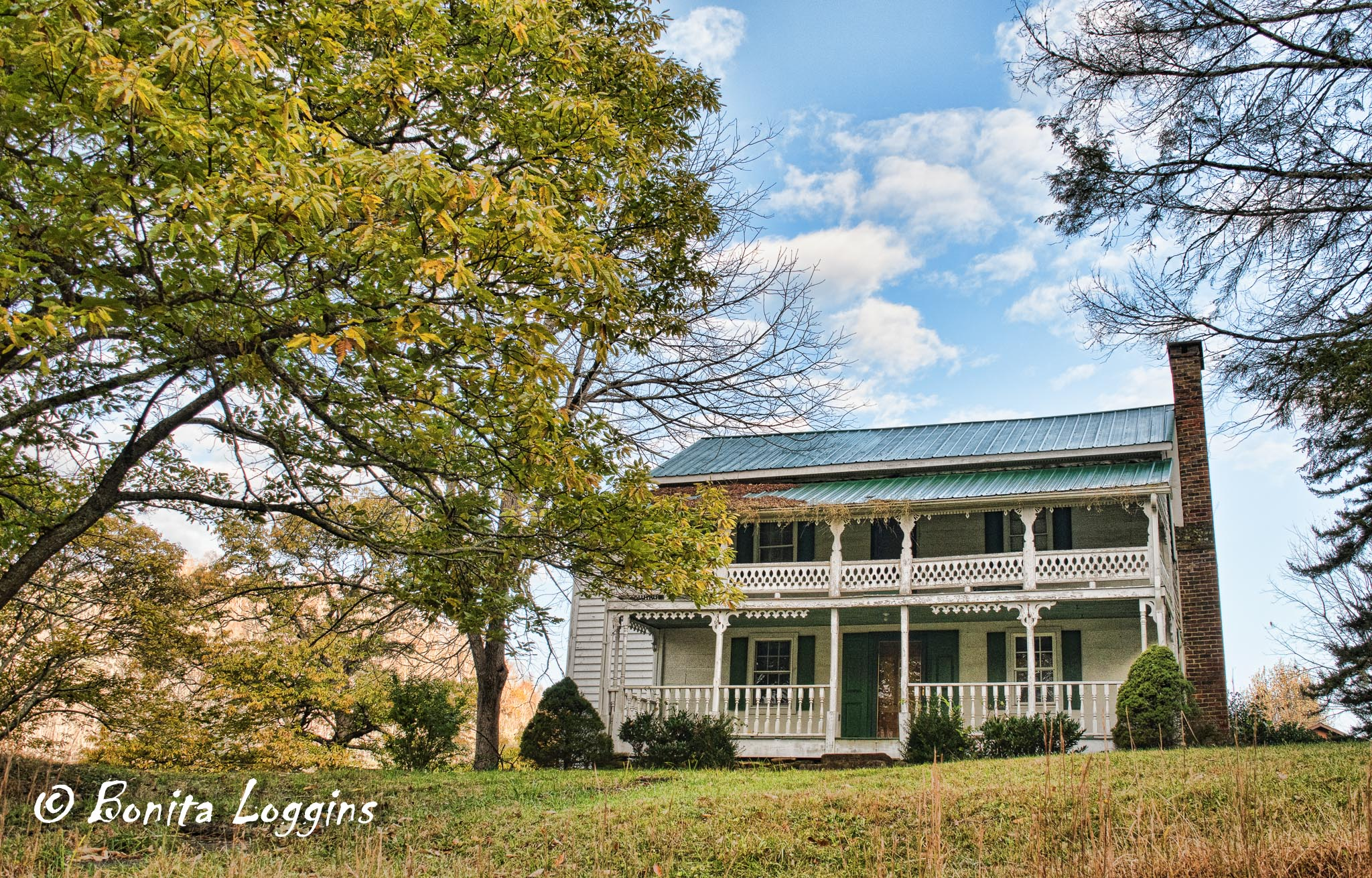

- Location within North Carolina Location within the United States
- Location: SW of Piney Creek on SR 1302, near Piney Creek, North Carolina
- Coordinates: 36°30′13″N 81°19′29″W
- Area: 8 acres (3.2 ha)
- Built: c. 1848, c. 1890, c. 1895
- Architect: Multiple
- Architectural style: Log construction
- NRHP reference No.: 76001297
- Added to NRHP: November 7, 1976

William Weaver House is a historic home located near Piney Creek, Alleghany County, North Carolina The original section was built about 1848, and expanded about 1890 and 1895. It began as an "L" plan with a two-story main block and a one-story ell of frame construction. A kitchen ell was built about 1890, then expanded to two stories about 1895, with the addition of a two-story front porch. Also on the property are complementing outbuildings of log and frame construction dating from about 1850 to 1940 and a family cemetery.

It was listed on the National Register of Historic Places in 1976.

== Description ==
Set along the east side of the South Fork of the New River, the William Weaver House owes its present appearance to three principal dates of construction— ca. 1848, ca. 1890, and ca. 1895. The house was erected as the seat of the Weaver farm on lands that were acquired in 1845. It was started as an "L" plan with a two-storey main block and a one-storey ell of frame construction clad in weatherboards and set on a full stone foundation. The ca. 1890 and ca. 1895 additions expanded the ell and raised it to a full two storeys. There are porches on the south, east and west elevations. Minor additions were made in this century. All later construction respected the integrity of the building fabric which preceded it, establishing a continuity of material and farm workmanship. The complementing outbuildings of log and frame construction also range in date of construction from ca. 1850 to ca. 1940. A family cemetery which is situated on a hilltop to the southeast of the residence, includes the graves of the builder, William Weaver and his successors.

William Weaver erected the first residence on the site around 1848. The main block which is two stories under a gable roof of sheet metal has a 3-bay front (south) elevation, and 2 bays, per story, on both east and west elevations. The elevation at the front has flush, horizontal sheathing with wider boards on the first floor than on the second. Lapped weatherboards cover the other elevations and the ell. The original one-story rear ell is one bay wide and three deep on the west elevation which forms a continuous surface with the west elevation of the main block. There is a common bond brick exterior end chimney with corbeled weatherings at the east gable end. A second brick chimney (now rebuilt to accommodate the second story) stood at the gable end of the kitchen ell. The present two-story shed-roof porch, a replacement for an earlier porch, dates from about 1895.

Bay of the center, on both stories, on the south front of the main block contains doors of three-panel construction. Each of the doors has an extensive horizontal panel across the bottom. The windows throughout have six-over-six sash. Windows of the front and the first floor’s chimney have frosted stencil decorations. A central quatrefoil design splits each pane into 4 equal parts each of which holds a stylized bunch of grapes. First level’s forefront window and door surrounds are plain unmolded boards with straight lintels. The aprons underneath the sills have a symmetrical curvilinear outline at the second level. The window surrounds the gable ends and of the ell are also plain unmolded boards whose lintels have broadly clipped corners.

== Significance ==
The William Weaver House and Farm is a crucial example of continued one-family ownership of a farmstead in the New River Valley: the three generations of Weaver ownership span 130 years. Its rich bottom lands stretch for just over a mile along the South Fork of the New River. William Weaver (1787-1876) bought this property in 1845. After a few years he erected the residence. Near the end of the 19th century, Andrew J. Weaver (1843-1932), William Weaver’s son, expanded and ornamented the house. Fortunately, different stages of additions valued the original building fabric. Important to the character of the farm are its outbuildings which variously date from each generation of ownership. William Weaver and his descendants are buried in a family cemetery southeast of the house.
