= Gap Civil Township, Alleghany County, North Carolina =

Township in Alleghany County, North Carolina, U.S.

Coordinates: 36.5138876°N 81.0975397°W

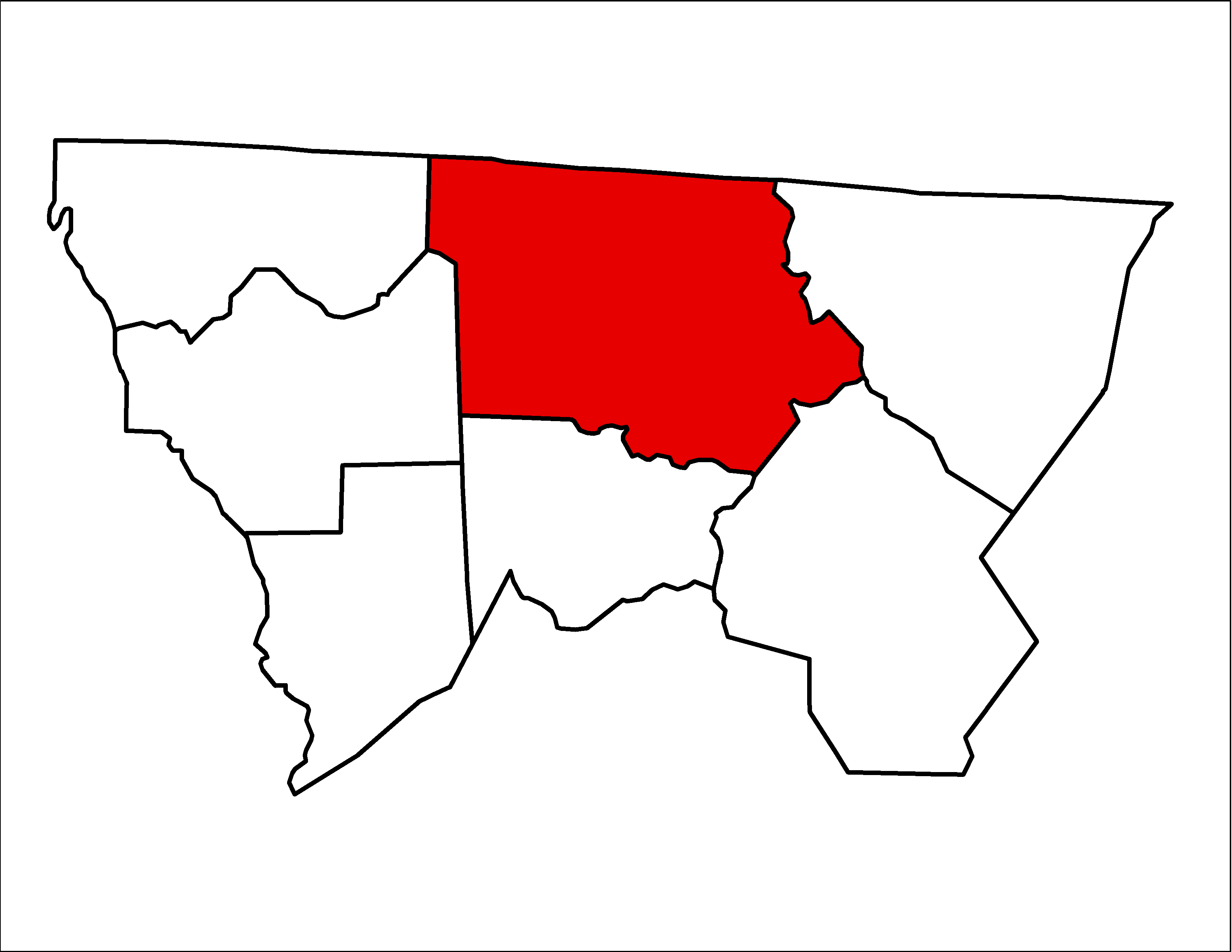
Location of Gap Civil Township in Alleghany County, N.C.

Gap Civil Township is one of seven townships in Alleghany County, North Carolina, United States. The township had a population of 4,474 according to the 2010 census.

Gap Civil Township occupies 48.8 square miles (126.4 km^{2}) in central Alleghany County. The only incorporated municipality within Gap Civil Township is the town of Sparta, the county seat of Alleghany County.
