= Alleghany High School (North Carolina) =

Location
- 404 Trojan Avenue; Sparta, North Carolina 28675; United States; 36°30′34″N 81°07′36″W

Information
- Type: Public
- School district: Alleghany County Schools
- CEEB code: 343700
- NCES School ID: 370012000037
- Principal: Travis Sturgill
- Staff: 11.95
- Teaching staff: 34.38 (FTE)
- Enrollment: 411 (2023–2024)
- Campus type: Rural
- Colors: Kelly Green and Vegas gold
- Athletics conference: Mountain Valley
- Mascot: Trojans
- Website: alleghany.k12.nc.us/Domain/11

== School information ==
For the 2010–2011 school year, Alleghany High School had a total population of 442 students and 35.50 teachers on a (FTE) basis. The student population had a gender ratio of 49.5% male to 50.5% female. The demographic group makeup of the student population was: White, 85.01%; Hispanic, 11.31%; Black, 1.36%; Asian/Pacific Islander, 0.23%; and American Indian, 0.23% (two or more races, 1.81%). For the same school year, 54.07% of the students received free or reduced-cost lunches.

== Athletics ==
Alleghany is a part of the North Carolina High School Athletic Association and is currently classified as a 1A school. It is a member of the Northwest 1A Conference. The Alleghany High team name is the Trojans, with the school colors being Kelly green and vegas gold. Sports teams at the school include baseball, basketball, football, golf, tennis, volleyball, and wrestling.

=== State championships ===
Alleghany has won the following NCHSAA team state championships:

- Boys Golf: 2001 (1A)
- Fast Pitch Softball: 2018 (1A)
- Slow Pitch Softball: 1992 (1A), 1994 (1A), 1995 (1A), 1996 (1A), 1998 (Open)
- Volleyball: 2015 (1A)
- Wrestling Dual Team: 1997 (1A/2A), 1999 (1A/2A), 2002 (1A), 2006 (1A), 2007 (1A), 2008 (1A)
- Wrestling Individual Team: 1989 (1A/2A), 1997 (1A/2A), 1998 (1A/2A)

== Honors and awards ==
The school is ranked at a Bronze Level on the U.S. News & World Report's Best Schools report. It is ranked in the top 20 in North Carolina in that report. Also, Alleghany High was recognized as a School of Distinction in by North Carolina Department of Public Instruction for the 2009–2010 school year.
