= Rock House (Roaring Gap, North Carolina) =

Historic house in North Carolina, United States

- U.S. National Register of Historic Places
- Location within North Carolina Location within the United States
- Location: 7 Chestnut Ln., Roaring Gap, North Carolina
- Coordinates: 36°24′47″N 80°57′46″W
- Area: 1.9 acres (0.77 ha)
- Built: 1929; 97 years ago
- Architect: Northup and O'Brien
- Architectural style: Rustic Revival
- NRHP reference No.: 04000827
- Added to NRHP: August 11, 2004

The Rock House, also known as the Bowman Gray House, is a historic home located in Roaring Gap, Alleghany County, North Carolina, United States. It was designed by architects Northup and O'Brien and built in 1929, and is a rambling, rock and chestnut bark-clad design that epitomizes the Rustic Revival style. Also on the property is a contributing Garage/Servant's Quarters (c. 1929).

It was listed on the National Register of Historic Places in 2004.
