= William T. Vogler Cottage =

Historic house in North Carolina, United States

- U.S. National Register of Historic Places
- Location within North Carolina Location within the United States
- Location: NC 1478 E side, approx. 1.3 mi. NE of US 21, Roaring Gap, North Carolina
- Coordinates: 36°24′9″N 80°58′5″W
- Area: 2.2 acres (0.89 ha)
- Built: 1908-1909
- Built by: Fogle Bros. Lumber Co.
- Architectural style: Queen Anne
- NRHP reference No.: 91001492
- Added to NRHP: September 30, 1991

The William T. Vogler Cottage, also known as the Locust Grove Cottage, was a historic home located in Roaring Gap, Alleghany County, North Carolina. It was built in 1908–1909, and was a 1 1/2-story Queen Anne style influenced frame cottage. It featured an expansive, wrap-around attached porch. Also on the property were a contributing garage from the 1920s and a yard. It has been demolished.

It was listed on the National Register of Historic Places in 1991.
