= Prathers Creek Township, Alleghany County, North Carolina =

Township in Alleghany County, North Carolina, U.S.

Coordinates: 36.494°N 81.263°W

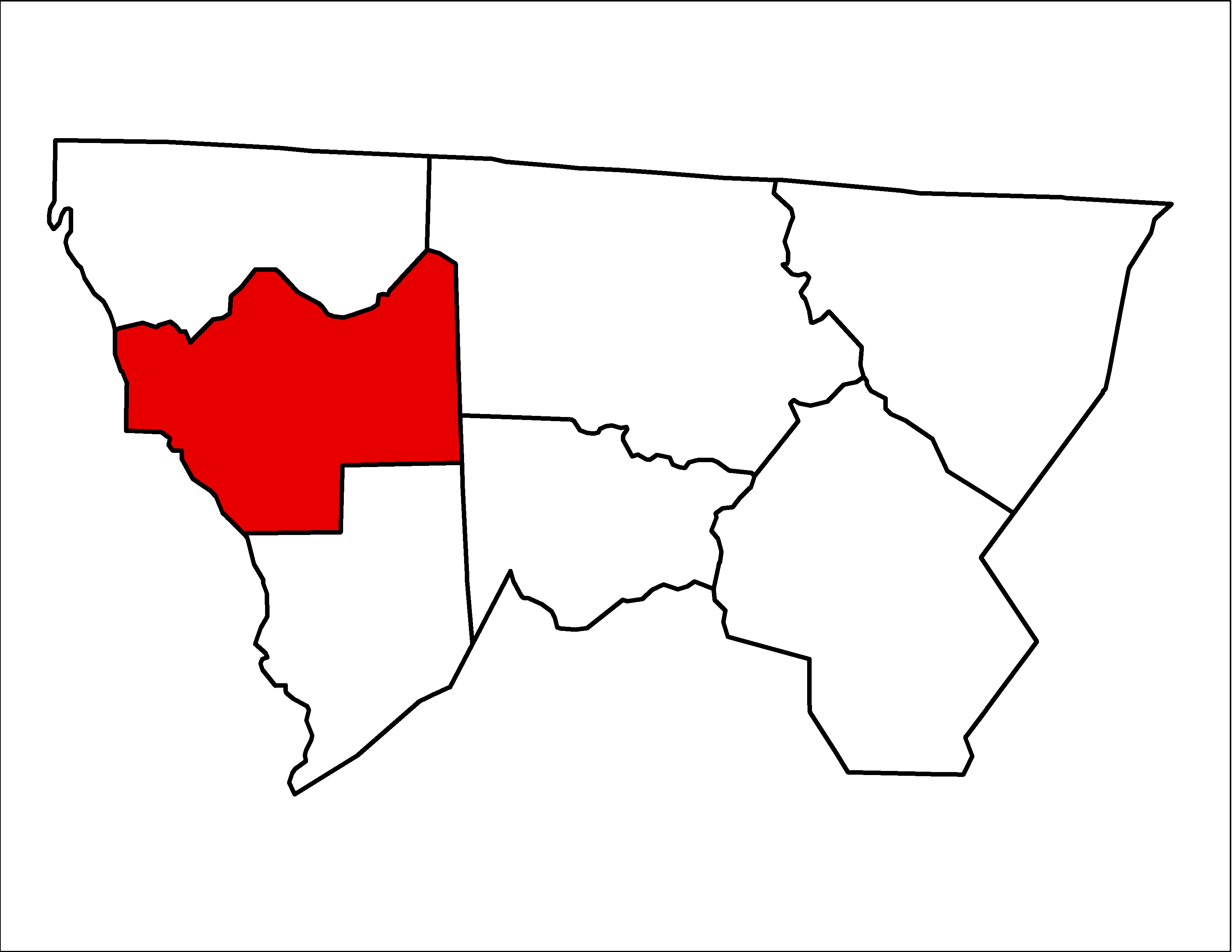
Location of Prathers Creek Township in Alleghany County, N.C.

Prathers Creek Township is one of seven townships in Alleghany County, North Carolina, United States. The township had a population of 869 according to the 2010 census. Before 1880, it included Cranberry Township.

Prathers Creek Township occupies 30.5 square miles (79.1 km^{2}), of which 0.46 square miles (1.2 km^{2}) is water, in western Alleghany County. The township's western border is with Ashe County.
