= List of Highway Historical Markers in Clay County, North Carolina =

Clay County, North Carolina is in District Q of the NC Highway Historical Marker Program, and has two markers as of July 2020. The marker program was created by the North Carolina General Assembly in 1935. Since that time over 1600 black and silver markers have been placed along numbered North Carolina highways throughout the state. Each one has a brief description of a fact relevant to state history, and is located near a place related to that fact. North Carolina's counties are divided into seventeen districts for the highway marker program. Each marker is assigned an identifier that begins with the letter of the district, followed by a number.

List of North Carolina Highway Historical Markers in Clay County, NC
Number	Title	Location	Text	Year Erected
Q-15	Fort Hembree	US 64 Business (Main Street) in Hayesville.	"One of the forts where General Winfield Scott's United States forces gathered the Cherokee before moving them west, stood 3/4 mi. N.W."	1939
Q-37	George W. Truett	US 64 southwest of Hayesville.	"Pastor First Baptist Church, Dallas, Texas, 1897-1944, president of Baptist World Alliance. His birthplace stands one mile northwest."	1950
