= Cherry Lane Township, Alleghany County, North Carolina =

Coordinates: 36.4213899°N 81.0092062°W

Cherry Lane, North Carolina
- Township
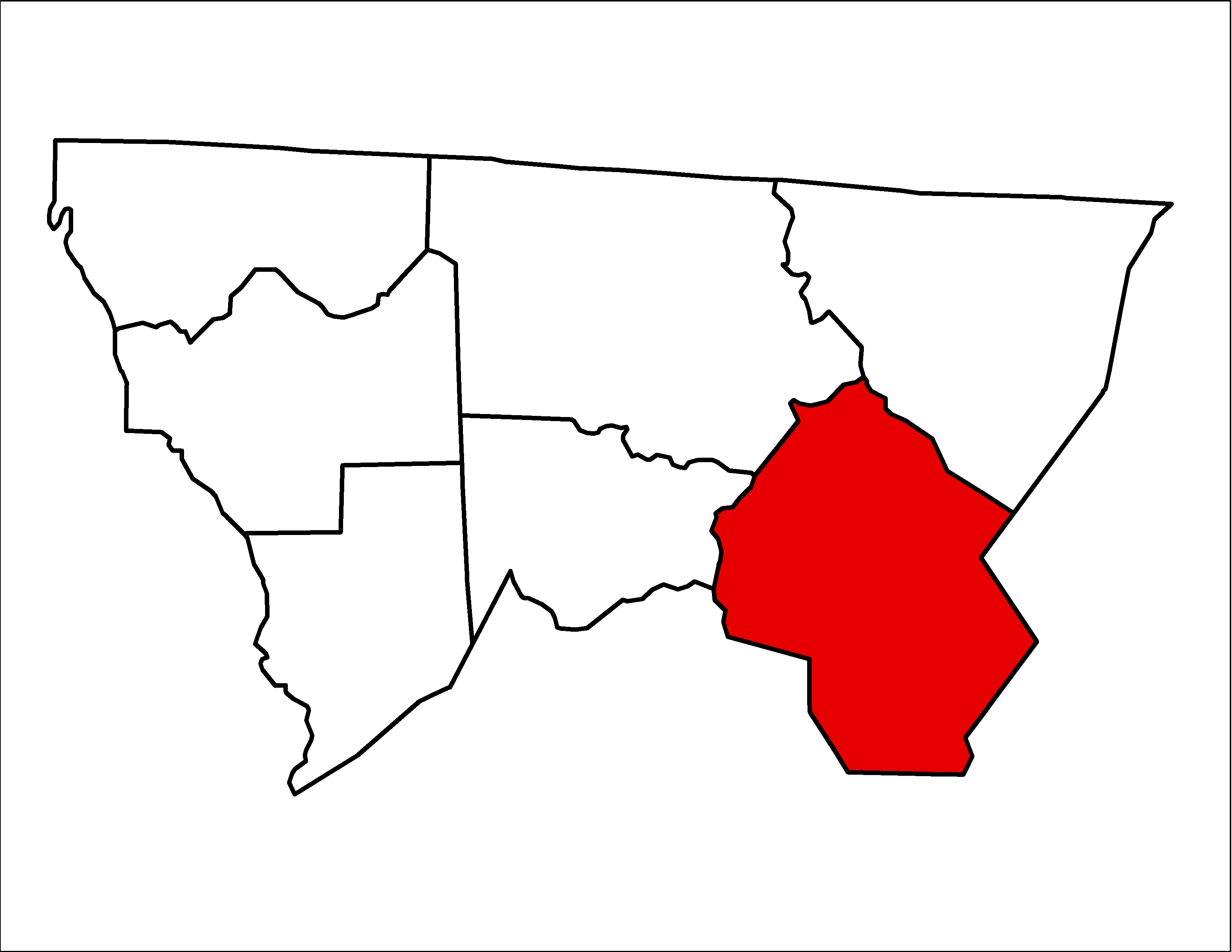
- Location of Cherry Lane Township in Alleghany County, N.C.
- Interactive map of Cherry Lane, North Carolina
- Country: United States
- State: North Carolina
- County: Alleghany

Population (2010)
  - Total: 1,528
- Time zone: Eastern (EST)
  - Summer (DST): EDT
- ZIP codes: 28668

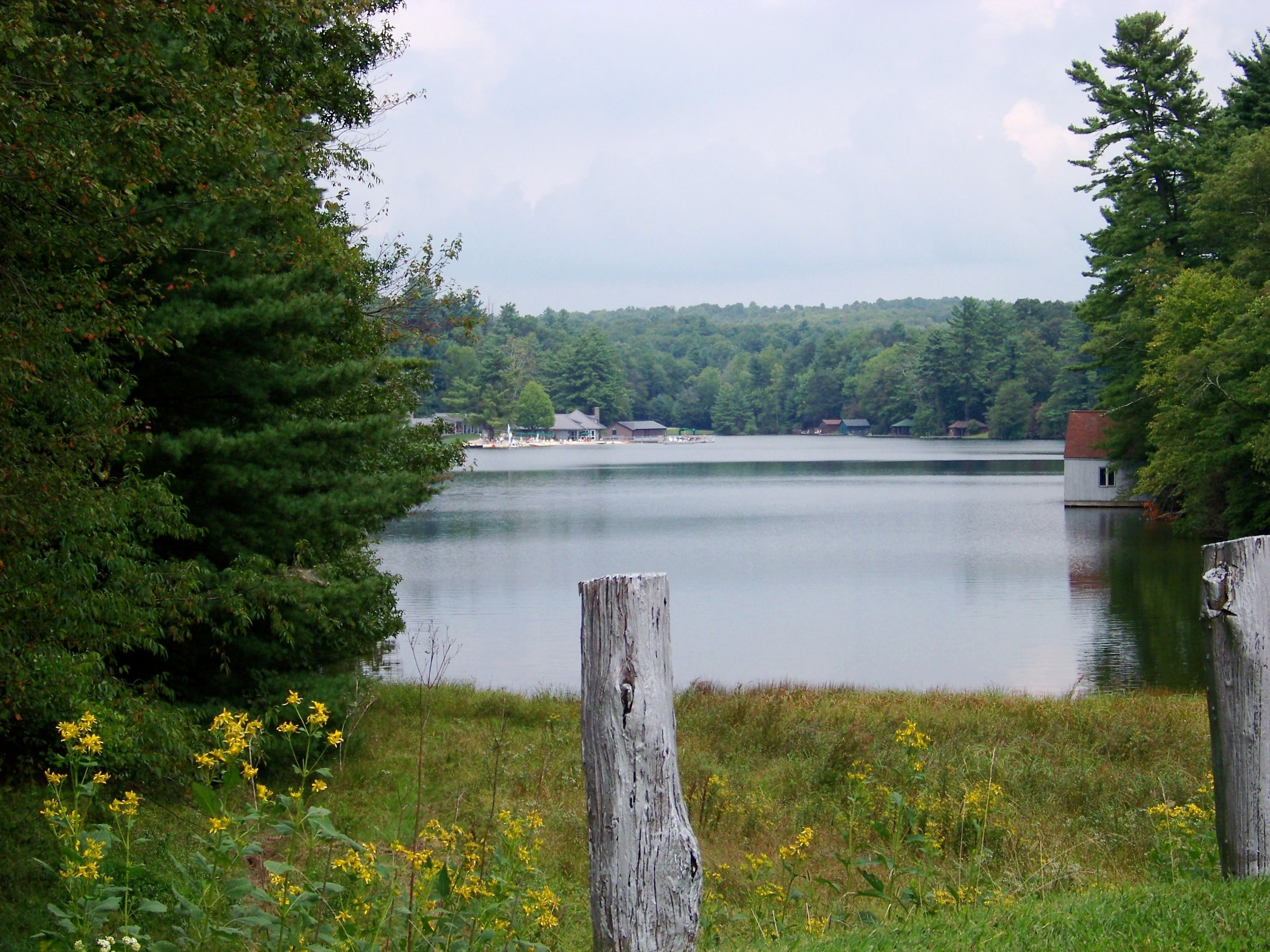
Lake Louise, in Cherry Lane Township

Cherry Lane Township is one of seven townships in Alleghany County, North Carolina, United States. The township had a population of 1,528 according to the 2010 census.

Cherry Lane Township occupies 40.7 square miles (105.5 km^{2}) in southeastern Alleghany County. The township's eastern border is with Surry County, and the southern border is with Wilkes County. There are no incorporated municipalities within the township. Unincorporated communities include Cherry Lane and Roaring Gap.
