= Cumberland Knob Picnic Area =

Blue Ridge Parkway Picnic Area

- Location within North Carolina
- Coordinates: 36.553752°N 80.9699°W
- Established: 1935
- Named for: Prince William, Duke of Cumberland

Cumberland Knob Picnic Area is a picnic area located on the border between Surry and Alleghany counties, North Carolina. It is a part of the Blue Ridge Parkway, located at milepost 217.5, and is operated by the National Park Service. It is the site where construction of the parkway first began in 1935 and was the first picnic area to be opened to the public.

== Name origin ==
The area gets its name from Prince William, Duke of Cumberland. The prince was the patron of Thomas Walker, a Virginia explorer, who named the area in the 1750s on an exploratory trip.

== Recreation ==
There are two trails, Cumberland Knob Trail and Gully Creek Trail. The Cumberland Knob trail is 0.5 miles (0.80 km) long and leads to the Cumberland Knob Overlook. The Gully Creek Trail is two miles (3.2 km) long and leads to nearby Gully Creek.
