= Lost Provinces =

The Lost Provinces were relatively inaccessible regions of North Carolina in the 19th and early 20th centuries, under-served by roads and railroads. In the mountainous northwest corner of the state, west of the Eastern Continental Divide. Ashe, Alleghany and Watauga counties in the New River basin were cut off from the rest of the state by the high Blue Ridge Mountains. The area's mountainous topography caused these counties to be most closely connected to Smyth and Grayson counties in Virginia, and to Johnson and Carter counties in Tennessee. The first highway to connect the area to points east was the Blowing Rock Turnpike. Started in 1911, it ran to Lenoir in Caldwell County. In 1914 a railroad was built to connect Ashe County to Abingdon, Virginia. After 1921 North Carolina Highway 16 connected Ashe County to Wilkesboro.

Other references to "lost provinces" of North Carolina have been applied to eastern counties north of the Albemarle Sound that had historically related more closely to Virginia than to the rest of the state.

== See also ==
- State of Franklin
- Overmountain Men
