= Glade Creek Township, Alleghany County, North Carolina =

Township in Alleghany County, North Carolina, U.S.

Coordinates: 36.5154486°N 80.9760556°W

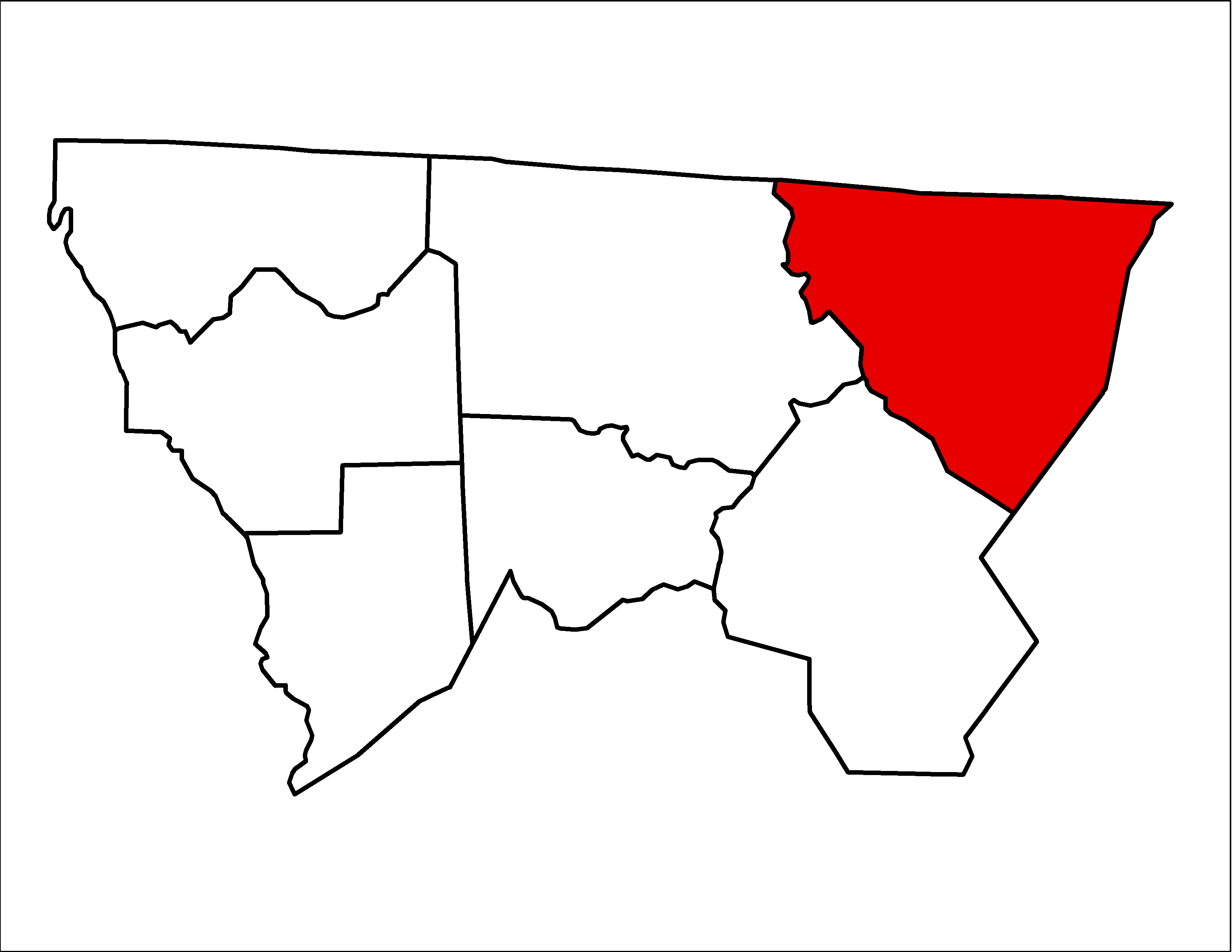
Location of Glade Creek Township in Alleghany County, N.C.

Glade Creek Township is one of seven townships in Alleghany County, North Carolina, United States. The township had a population of 1,991 according to the 2010 census.

Glade Creek Township occupies 39.8 square miles (103.0 km^{2}) in northeastern Alleghany County. The township's eastern border is with Surry County, and the northern border is with the state of Virginia.
