= List of Highway Historical Markers in Greene County, North Carolina =

Greene County, North Carolina is in District F of the NC Highway Historical Marker Program, and has two markers as of July 2020. The marker program was created by the North Carolina General Assembly in 1935. Since that time over 1600 black and silver markers have been placed along numbered North Carolina highways throughout the state. Each one has a brief description of a fact relevant to state history, and is located near a place related to that fact. North Carolina's counties are divided into seventeen districts for the highway marker program. Each marker is assigned an identifier that begins with the letter of the district, followed by a number.

List of North Carolina Highway Historical Markers in Greene County, NC
Number	Title	Location	Text	Year Erected
F-37	Nooherooka	NC 58 at SR 1058 (Old SR 1201) northwest of Snow Hill.	"Tuscarora stronghold. Site of decisive battle of the Tuscarora War, March 20–23, 1713, when 950 Indians were killed or captured. Site 1 mi. N."	1961
F-66	James Glasgow ca. 1735-1819	NC 58 at SR 1222 (Sheppards Ferry Road) northwest of Snow Hill.	"The first Secretary of State of N.C., 1777-98. Glasgow (now Greene) County was named for him. Convicted of land fraud. Lived 2 mi. N.E."	2002
