= The Alleghany News =

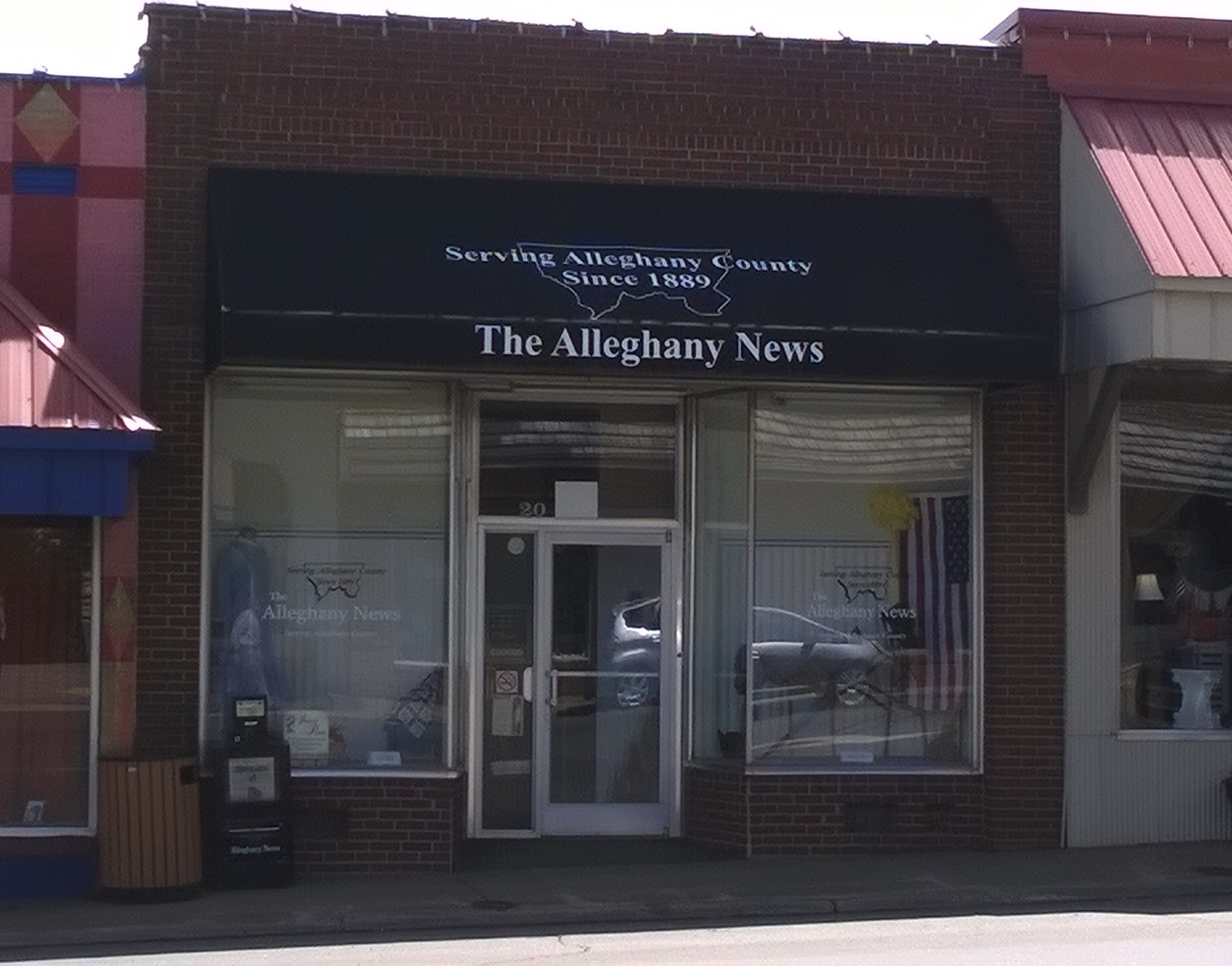
- Office of The Alleghany News in Sparta, North Carolina
- Type: Weekly newspaper
- Format: Broadsheet
- Owner(s): Alleghany Holdings, LLC
- Publisher: Coby LaRue
- Editor: Bob Bamberg
- Founded: 1889
- Language: English
- Headquarters: 20 South Main Street, Sparta, North Carolina, United States
- Circulation: 3,800
- OCLC number: 13118341
- Website: alleghanynews.com
- Free online archives: The Alleghany News

The Alleghany News is a weekly newspaper, published in Sparta, North Carolina, United States. The newspaper is locally owned by Alleghany Holdings, LLC. The paper has its origins in The Alleghany Star, which was first published in 1889, by a man named A. S. Carson. In the 1930s, the Alleghany Star merged with Alleghany Times and became Alleghany News. As of 2016 the publisher of the paper was Coby Larue and the editor was Bob Bamberg.

== See also ==
- List of newspapers in North Carolina
