= Robert L. Doughton =

American politician (1863–1954)

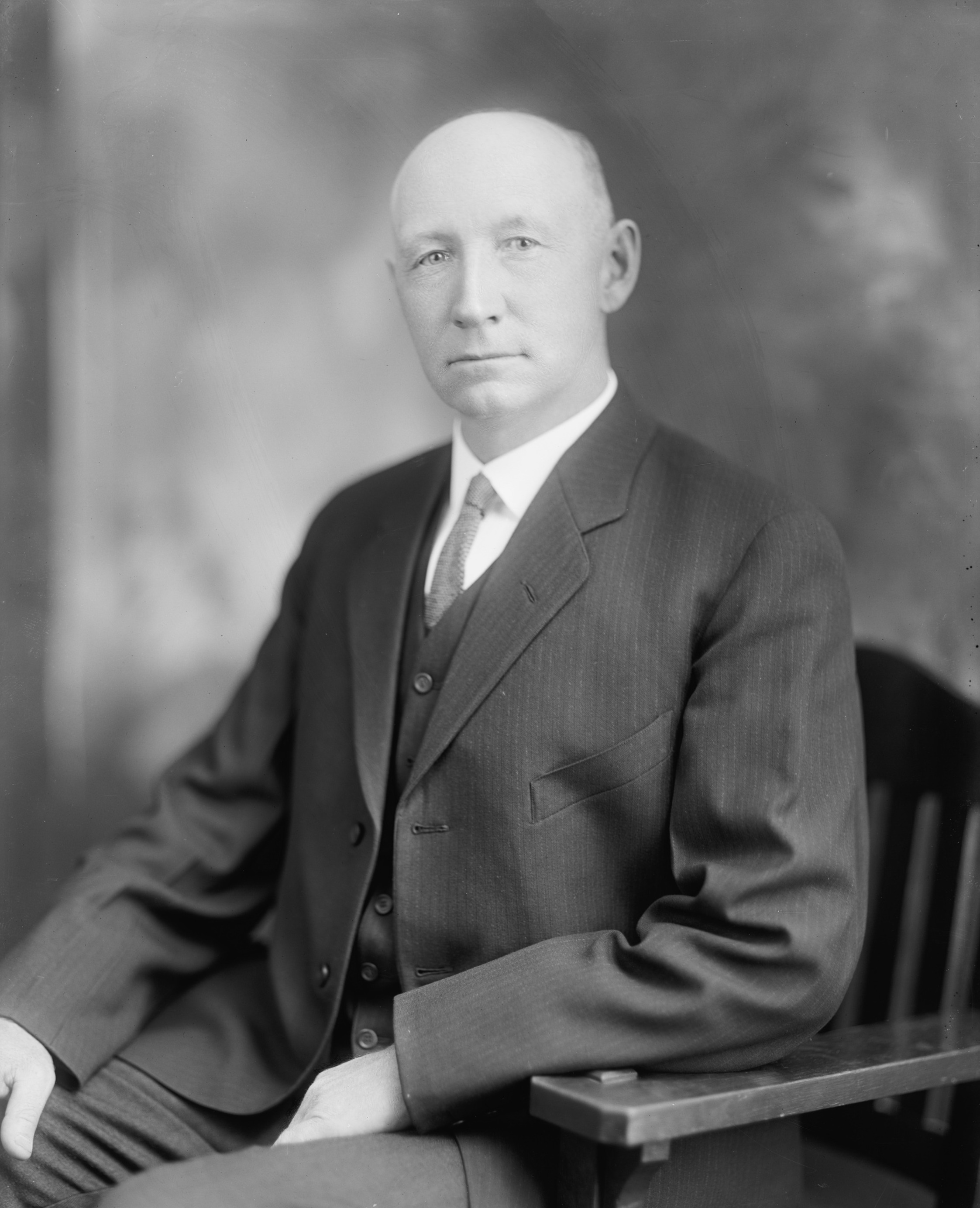
- Doughton, c. 1920s

36th Dean of the United States House of Representatives
- In office November 6, 1952 – January 3, 1953
- Preceded by: Adolph J. Sabath
- Succeeded by: Sam Rayburn

Member of the U.S. House of Representatives from North Carolina
- In office March 4, 1911 – January 3, 1953
- Preceded by: Charles H. Cowles
- Succeeded by: Hugh Q. Alexander
- Constituency: 8th district (1911–1933); 9th district (1933–1953)

Member of the North Carolina Senate from the 35th district
- In office 1908–1909
- Preceded by: E. F. Lovill
- Succeeded by: John M. Wagoner

Personal details
- Born: Robert Lee Doughton; November 7, 1863 Laurel Springs, North Carolina, U.S.
- Died: October 1, 1954 (aged 90) Laurel Springs, North Carolina, U.S.
- Party: Democratic

Robert Lee "Bob" Doughton (November 7, 1863 – October 1, 1954), of Alleghany County, North Carolina, sometimes known as "Farmer Bob", was a member of the United States House of Representatives from North Carolina for 42 consecutive years (1911–1953). A Democrat originally from Laurel Springs, North Carolina, he was the dean of the United States House of Representatives for his last few months in Congress. He is the longest-serving member ever of the United States House of Representatives from the state of North Carolina. In the 1930s Doughton was a key player in the creation of the Blue Ridge Parkway and the passage of the Social Security Act.

According to one study, Doughton was part of a “hardy band of southern liberals in Congress” that was “inspired and directed” by Franklin Roosevelt’s leadership. Years later, in a 1946 speech, Doughton noted various positive reforms that had been carried out under Roosevelt such as Social Security, minimum wage legislation, and legal rights to collective bargaining.

== Family and education ==
Doughton's father was a captain in the Confederate Army during the American Civil War; he named his son Robert after Confederate General Robert E. Lee. Robert earned the equivalent of a high-school diploma from the Traphill Academy. Although he never attended college, he was awarded honorary bachelor's degrees from the University of North Carolina at Chapel Hill and Catawba College during his political career.

Doughton was married twice. His first wife, Boyd Greer, died in 1895 after only two years of marriage. He remarried in 1898 to Lillie Hix; they remained married until her death in 1946. He had two sons and two daughters. His elder brother was Rufus A. Doughton, who was at various times Speaker of the North Carolina House of Representatives and Lieutenant Governor of North Carolina. Doughton was a member and deacon of the Laurel Springs Baptist Church. After his death in 1954 at the age of 90 he was buried next to his wife Lillie in the church cemetery. In the 1990s Rufus Doughton's former home in Laurel Springs was restored, and it is now a popular bed-and-breakfast for tourists to the region.

The Robert L. Doughton House was listed on the National Register of Historic Places in 1979.

== Business and political career ==
In private life, Doughton was a prosperous farmer and banker. By 1900 he owned over 5,000 acres (20 km^{2}) of land in his native Alleghany County, North Carolina, where he raised herds of prized Hereford and Holstein cows. He was also the owner and president of the Deposit Savings and Loan Bank in North Wilkesboro, North Carolina; when the bank merged in 1936 with several other banks and formed the Northwestern Bank, Doughton briefly served as the new bank's director. His interest in farming led to his being named to the North Carolina Board of Agriculture in 1903; this marked the beginning of his career in politics. Before being elected to Congress, Doughton served one term in the North Carolina Senate (1908–09) and was director of the state Prison Board (1909–11).

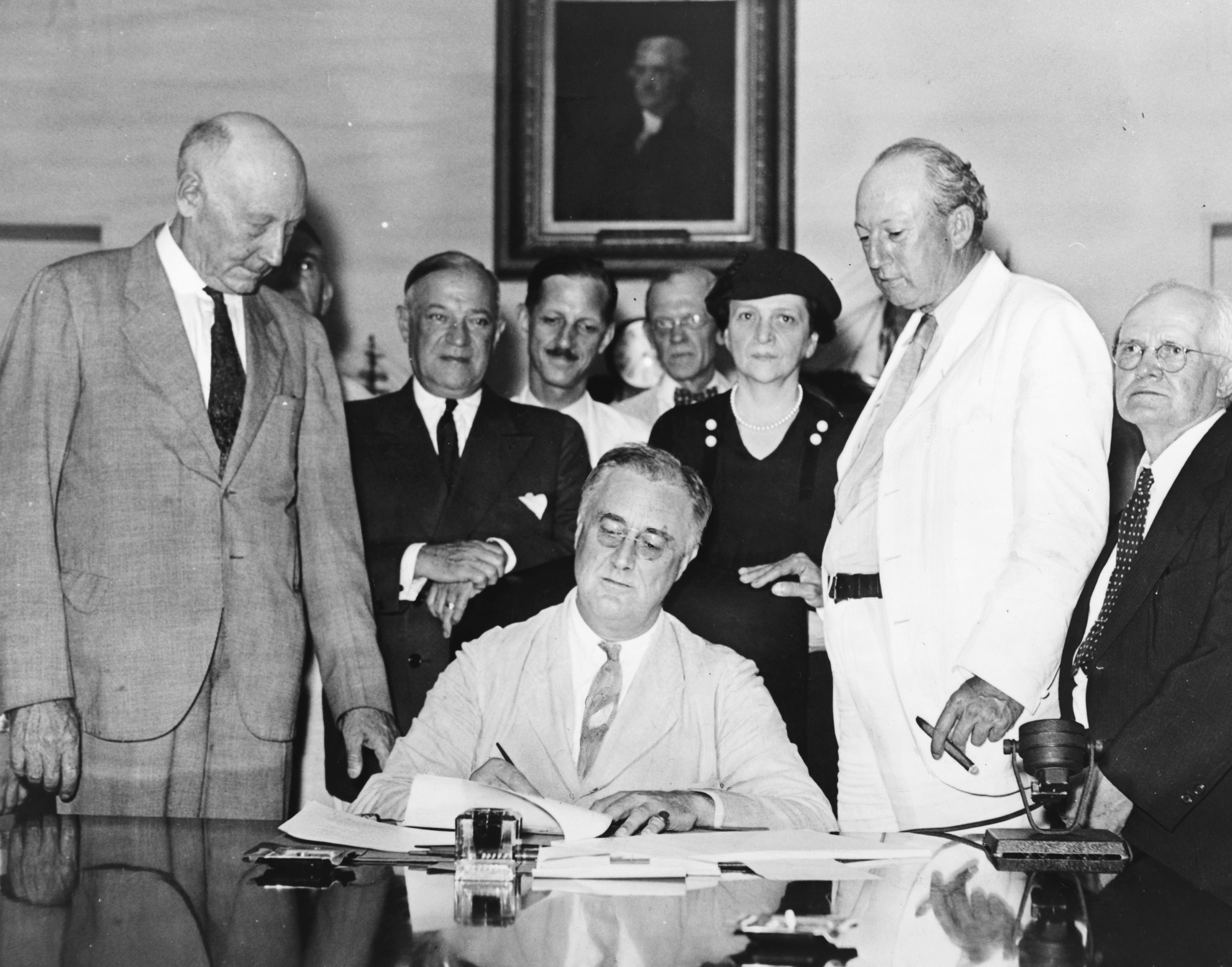
President Roosevelt signs the Social Security Act into law, August 14, 1935. (Doughton at far left)

=== Congressional achievements ===
Doughton with Henry A. Wallace in 1940.

Doughton was for 18 years (1933–1947 and 1949–1953) the Chairman of the powerful U.S. House Committee on Ways and Means, and as such he co-sponsored, held hearings on, and oversaw the passage of the Social Security Act in 1935. Doughton was also instrumental in the creation of the Blue Ridge Parkway, America's most-traveled scenic highway. The largest park and recreational area on the parkway is named in his honor. Doughton is also known for introducing the Marihuana Tax Act of 1937, which effectively served as a federal ban on marijuana prohibition in the United States in lieu of federal authority to directly regulate medicines or drugs.

During the presidency of Herbert Hoover, Doughton played a part in defeating a proposal for a general sales tax, which Doughton described as “the greatest victory…achieved for the common people since the days of Woodrow Wilson.”

Doughton talking with Washington (state) Congressman Charles H. Leavy in 1939.

Doughton with Texas Congressman Wright Patman in 1937, talking about a pension bill.

== See also ==
- North Carolina's congressional delegations
- Dean of the United States House of Representatives

U.S. House of Representatives
Preceded by Charles H. Cowles	Member of the U.S. House of Representatives from North Carolina's 8th congressional district 1911–1933	Succeeded by Walter Lambeth
Preceded by Alfred L. Bulwinkle	Member of the U.S. House of Representatives from North Carolina's 9th congressional district 1933–1953	Succeeded by Hugh Q. Alexander
Honorary titles
Preceded by Adolph Joachim Sabath	Dean of the House; November 1952 – January 1953	Succeeded by Sam Rayburn
Preceded by Walter M. Pierce	Oldest member of the U.S. House of Representatives; 1943–1953	Succeeded by Brent Spence
