= Piney Creek Township, Alleghany County, North Carolina =

Township in Alleghany County, North Carolina, U.S.

Coordinates: 36.5599496°N 81.2849169°W

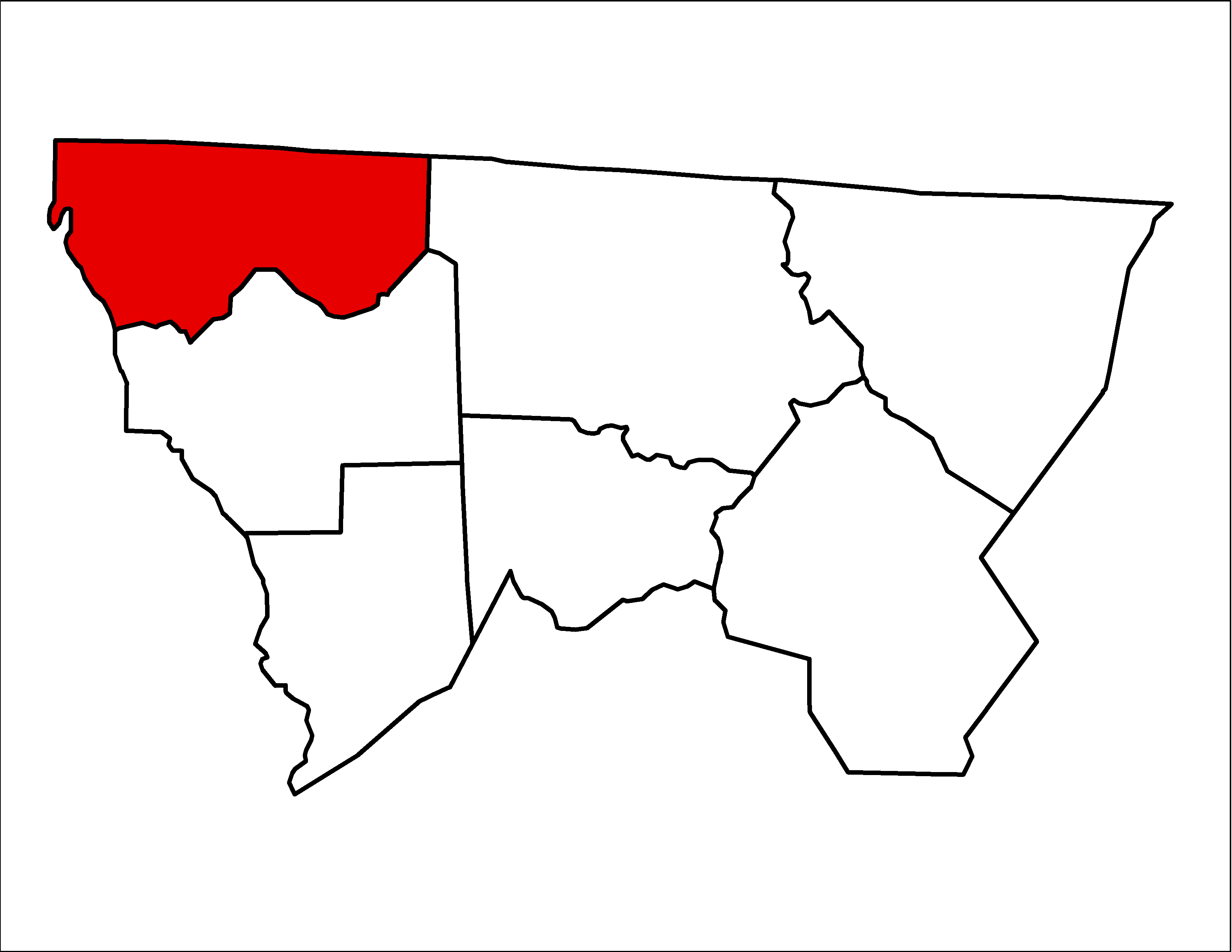
Location of Piney Creek Township in Alleghany County, N.C.

Piney Creek Township is one of seven townships in Alleghany County, North Carolina, United States. The township had a population of 858 according to the 2010 census.

Piney Creek Township occupies 28.8 square miles (74.6 km^{2}) in northwestern Alleghany County. There are no incorporated municipalities located in Piney Creek Township, though there are several unincorporated communities located here, including the community of Piney Creek. The township's western border is with Ashe County, and the northern border is with the state of Virginia.
