= North Carolina Highway Historical Marker Program =

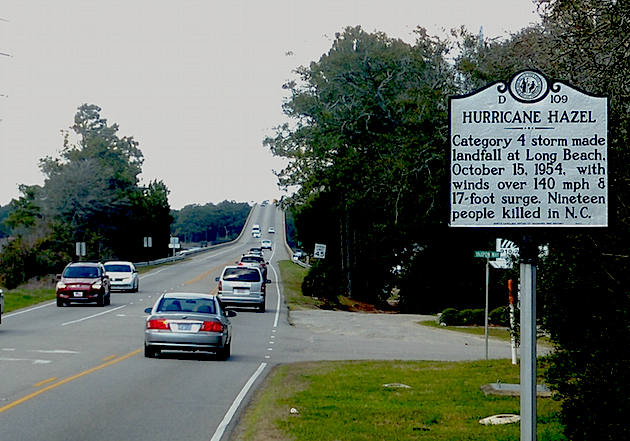
Example of NC Highway Historical Marker

The North Carolina Highway Historical Marker Program was created by the North Carolina General Assembly in 1935. Since that time over 1600 black and silver markers have been placed along numbered North Carolina highways throughout the state. Each one has a brief description of a fact relevant to state history, and is located near a place related to that fact.

== Historical Marker Districts ==
North Carolina's counties are divided into seventeen districts for the highway marker program; each district is designated by a letter, and covers between four and eight counties. Each marker is assigned an identifier that begins with the letter of the district.

Name of District	Counties Within the District
District A	Bertie, Camden, Chowan, Currituck, Gates, Hertford, Pasquotank, Perquimans
District B	Beaufort, Dare, Hyde, Martin, Tyrrell, Washington
District C	Carteret, Craven, Jones, Onslow, Pamlico
District D	Brunswick, Columbus, New Hanover, Pender
District E	Edgecombe, Franklin, Halifax, Nash, Northampton, Warren
District F	Greene, Lenoir, Pitt, Wayne, Wilson
District G	Alamance, Caswell, Durham, Granville, Orange, Person, Vance
District H	Chatham, Hartnett, Johnston, Lee, Wake
District I	Bladen, Cumberland, Hoke, Robeson, Sampson, Scotland
District J	Forsyth, Guilford, Rockingham, Stokes
District K	Anson, Davidson, Montgomery, Moore, Randolph, Richmond
District L	Cabarrus, Mecklenburg, Rowan, Stanly, Union
District M	Alexander, Alleghany, Ashe, Davie, Iredell, Surry, Wilkes, Yadkin
District N	Avery, Burke, Caldwell, McDowell, Mitchell, Watauga, Yancey
District O	Catawba, Cleveland, Gaston, Lincoln, Polk, Rutherford
District P	Buncombe, Haywood, Henderson, Madison, Transylvania
District Q	Cherokee, Clay, Graham, Jackson, Macon, Swain
