= Roaring Gap, North Carolina =

Coordinates: 36°24′10″N 80°59′07″W

- Census-designated place
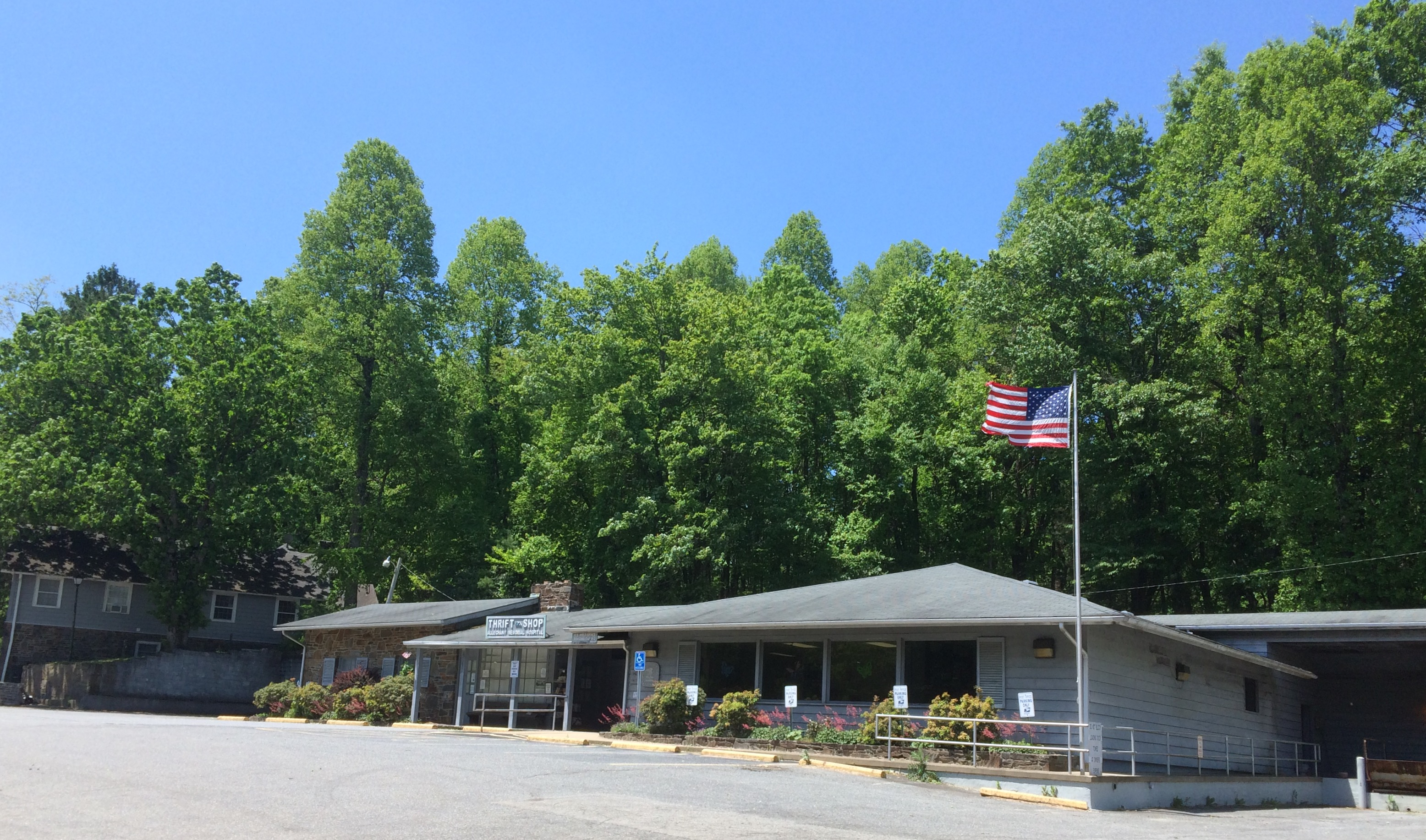
- Post office in Roaring Gap
- Interactive map of Roaring Gap, North Carolina
- Country: United States
- State: North Carolina
- County: Alleghany
- Elevation: 2,877 ft (877 m)
- Time zone: Eastern (EST)
  - Summer (DST): EDT
- ZIP codes: 28668
- GNIS feature ID: 1022313

Roaring Gap is an unincorporated community in the Cherry Lane Township of Alleghany County, North Carolina, United States, situated near the border with Wilkes County. Home to three private golf communities, Roaring Gap is a popular summer colony.

== History ==
Roaring Gap was established in 1890 as a summer resort by Elkin, North Carolina industrialist Alexander Chatham, one of the founders of the Chatham Manufacturing Company. The community derives its name from the noise the wind makes when rushing through the mountains located there. Roaring Gap has 3 Golf and Country Clubs in its area; High Meadows Country Club, Roaring Gap Club and Olde Beau Golf Club. A 54-acre reservoir, Lake Louise, is situated within the Roaring Gap Club.

YMCA Camp Cheerio, which is owned by the YMCA in High Point, is also in Roaring Gap.

The Rock House and William T. Vogler Cottage are listed on the National Register of Historic Places.

Roaring Gap is home to Antioch United Methodist Church, a historic United Methodist country chapel located across from High Meadows Country Club. The church grounds include a cemetery, with graves from the 19th century up to the 21st century.

== Demographics ==
Roaring Gap's Zip Code Tabulation Area (Zip Code 28668) has a population of 142 as of the 2000 census. The population is 52.1% male and 47.9% female. About 98.6% of the population is white and 1.4% is Hispanic.

The median household income is $61,154 with 0% of the population living below the poverty line.

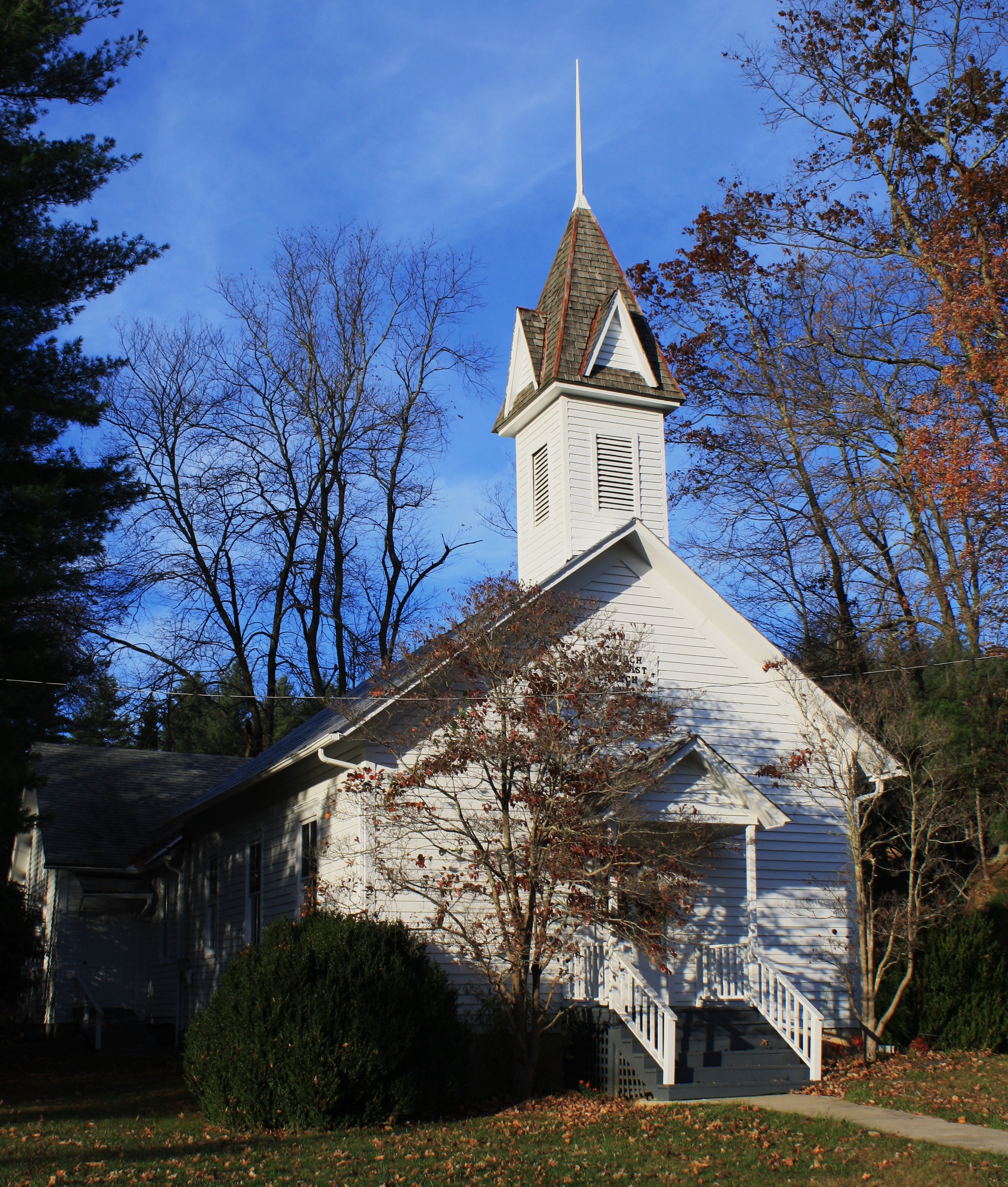
Antioch United Methodist Church

== See also ==
- Stone Mountain State Park
