= Cranberry Township, Alleghany County, North Carolina =

Township in Alleghany County, North Carolina, U.S.

Coordinates: 36.426°N 81.219°W

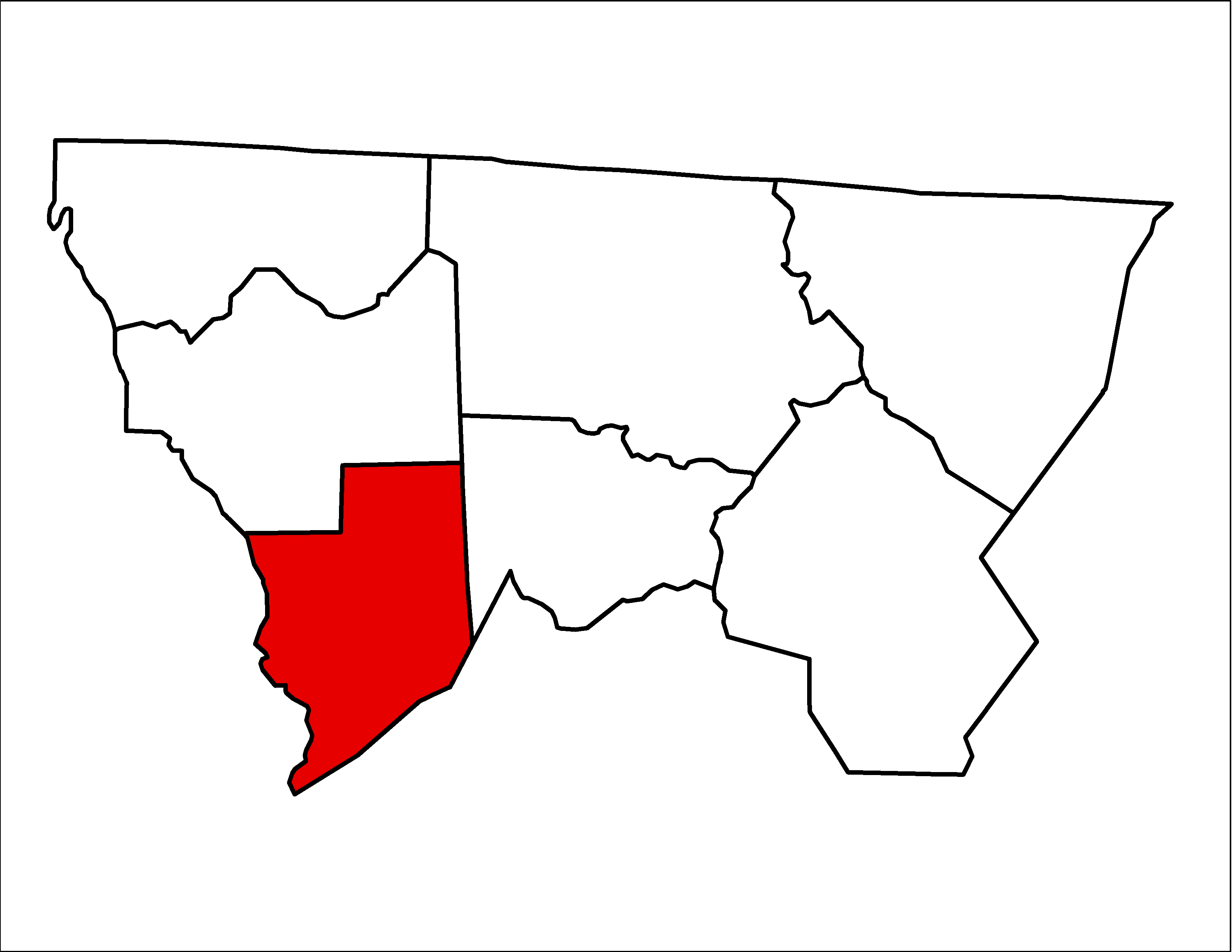
Location of Cranberry Township in Alleghany County, North Carolina

Cranberry Township is one of seven townships in Alleghany County, North Carolina, United States. The township had a population of 375, according to the 2010 census. Before 1880, it was included in Prathers Creek Township.

Cranberry Township occupies 23.9 square miles (62.0 km^{2}) in southwestern Alleghany County. The township's western border is with Ashe County, and the southern border is shared with Wilkes County.
