= Laurel Springs, North Carolina =

- Unincorporated community
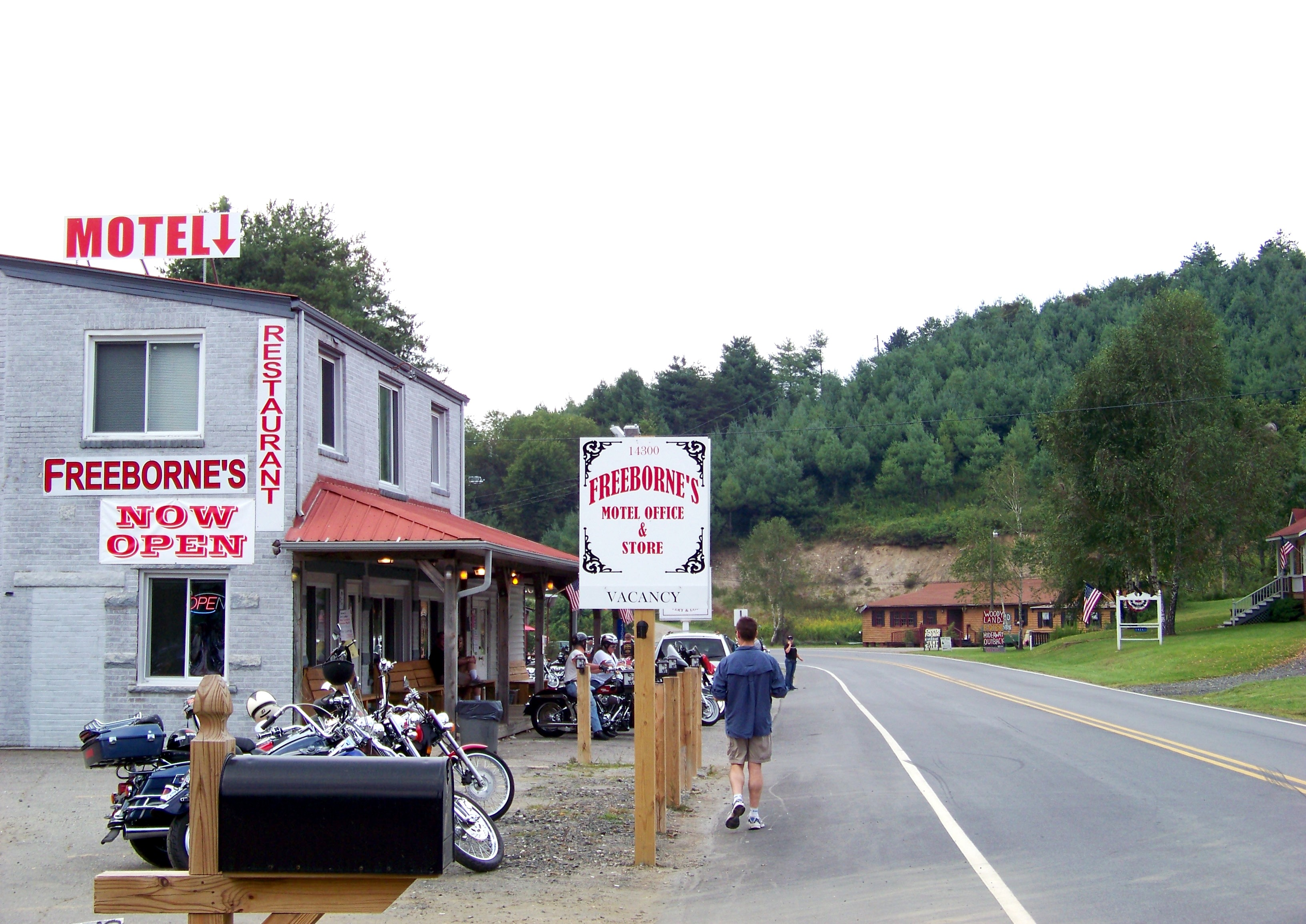
- Entering Laurel Springs

- Location within North Carolina Location within the United States
- Coordinates: 36°24′41″N 81°15′46″W
- Country: United States
- State: North Carolina
- County: Alleghany
- Elevation: 2,749 ft (838 m)
- Time zone: UTC-5 (Eastern (EST))
  - Summer (DST): UTC-4 (EDT)
- ZIP code: 28644
- Area code: 336
- GNIS feature ID: 1021119

Laurel Springs is an unincorporated community in Alleghany County, North Carolina, United States. Laurel Springs is located at the junction of North Carolina Highway 18 and North Carolina Highway 88 near the Ashe County line, 10.2 miles (16.4 km) southwest of Sparta. The Blue Ridge Parkway also crosses the center of the community. Laurel Springs has a post office with ZIP code 28644.

The Robert L. Doughton House was listed on the National Register of Historic Places in 1979.
