= High Meadows Country Club =

Country club and neighborhood in Roaring Gap, North Carolina

Coordinates: 36°24′19″N 80°59′51″W

High Meadows Golf and Country Club
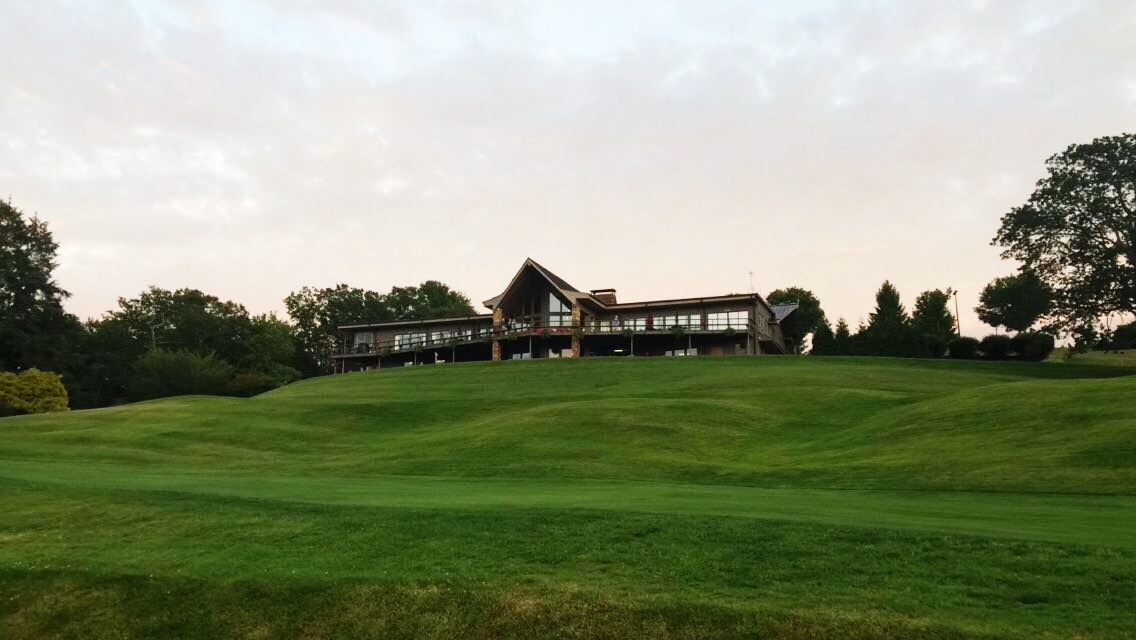
- Interactive map of High Meadows Golf and Country Club

Club information
- Location: 1288 Country Club Road; Roaring Gap, North Carolina; United States
- Established: 1964
- Type: Private/Residential
- Operator: Robin O'Neil
- Tota holes: 18
- Website: highmeadowscountryclub.com
- Designed by: George Cobb

High Meadows Golf and Country Club is a private golf club and residential neighborhood in Roaring Gap, North Carolina. The club is located in the Blue Ridge Mountains near the North Carolina and Virginia state borders, along U.S. Route 21.

== History ==
In 1770, the Smith family of Norfolk, Virginia settled in Roaring Gap on land that is now part of High Meadows. The land had been a hunting ground for the Cherokee. Daniel Boone once camped near the homestead's stream, which still flows through the golf course. The chimney of the original Smith house has been preserved and can be seen from the golf course. Several moonshine stills existed on the Smith's property.

In 1963, Robert Glenn Davis scoped out the area for land to build a summer resort and golf course, which would be named Alleghany Heights. The name was later decided as High Meadows, and the golf club was incorporated on July 1, 1964. In 1965, Davis worked with Jim Massey, a general contractor and civil engineer, to design the first homes in High Meadows. The first house, built for the Rhodes family, was completed in 1965. The second home, for the Fox family, was completed in 1966. As of 2016, there are over 300 private homes in High Meadows.

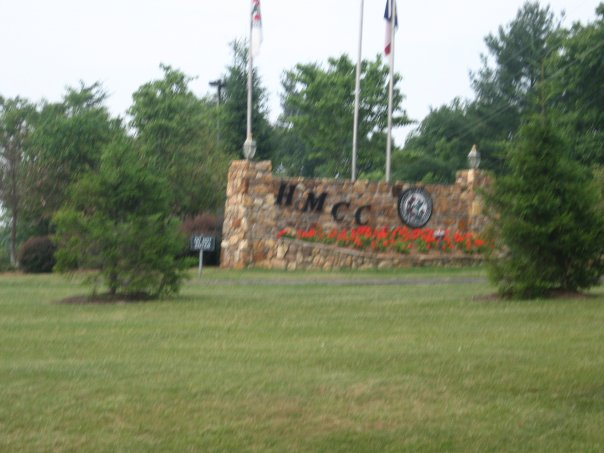
entrance to the club

The clubhouse, located over the 18th green with a view of the lake, was built in 1966 by architect Claus R. Moberg. The golf course was designed by George Cobb.

A ski slope was built in 1966, but was later closed and became part of the golf course. The swimming pool and tennis courts were built in the 1970s.
