= Cherry Lane, North Carolina =

Coordinates: 36°26′31″N 81°01′05″W

- Census-designated place
- Interactive map of Cherry Lane, North Carolina
- Country: United States
- State: North Carolina
- County: Alleghany
- Established: 1838
- Elevation: 2,854 ft (870 m)
- Time zone: Eastern (EST)
  - Summer (DST): EDT
- ZIP codes: 28668
- GNIS feature ID: 983084

Cherry Lane is an unincorporated community located in the Cherry Lane Township of Alleghany County, North Carolina, United States. The community was settled circa 1838 and was named for the cherry tree-bordered lane that led to the home of local resident Frank Bryan. The community is located along U.S. Highway 21, near its junction with the Blue Ridge Parkway in southeastern Alleghany County.

== See also ==
- Cherry Lane Township

== Works cited ==
- Powell, William S. (1968). The North Carolina Gazetteer: A Dictionary of Tar Heel Places. Chapel Hill: University of North Carolina Press. ISBN 0-8078-1247-1.
