= Piney Creek, North Carolina =

Unincorporated community in North Carolina, US

Coordinates: 36°33′01″N 81°17′19″W

Piney Creek is an unincorporated community located in Piney Creek Township, Alleghany County, North Carolina, United States. (Powell 1968, p. 384)

== History ==
The William Weaver House was listed on the National Register of Historic Places in 1976.

== Demographics ==
Piney Creek's Zip Code Tabulation Area (Zip Code 28663) has a population of 580 as of the 2000 census. The population is 51.2% male and 48.8% female. About 98.8% of the population is white, 0.7% African-American, 3.8% Hispanic, and 0.5% of people are two or more races.

The median household income is $34,405 with 18.4% of the population living below the poverty line.

== See also ==
- Piney Creek Township
