= Sparta, North Carolina =

- Town
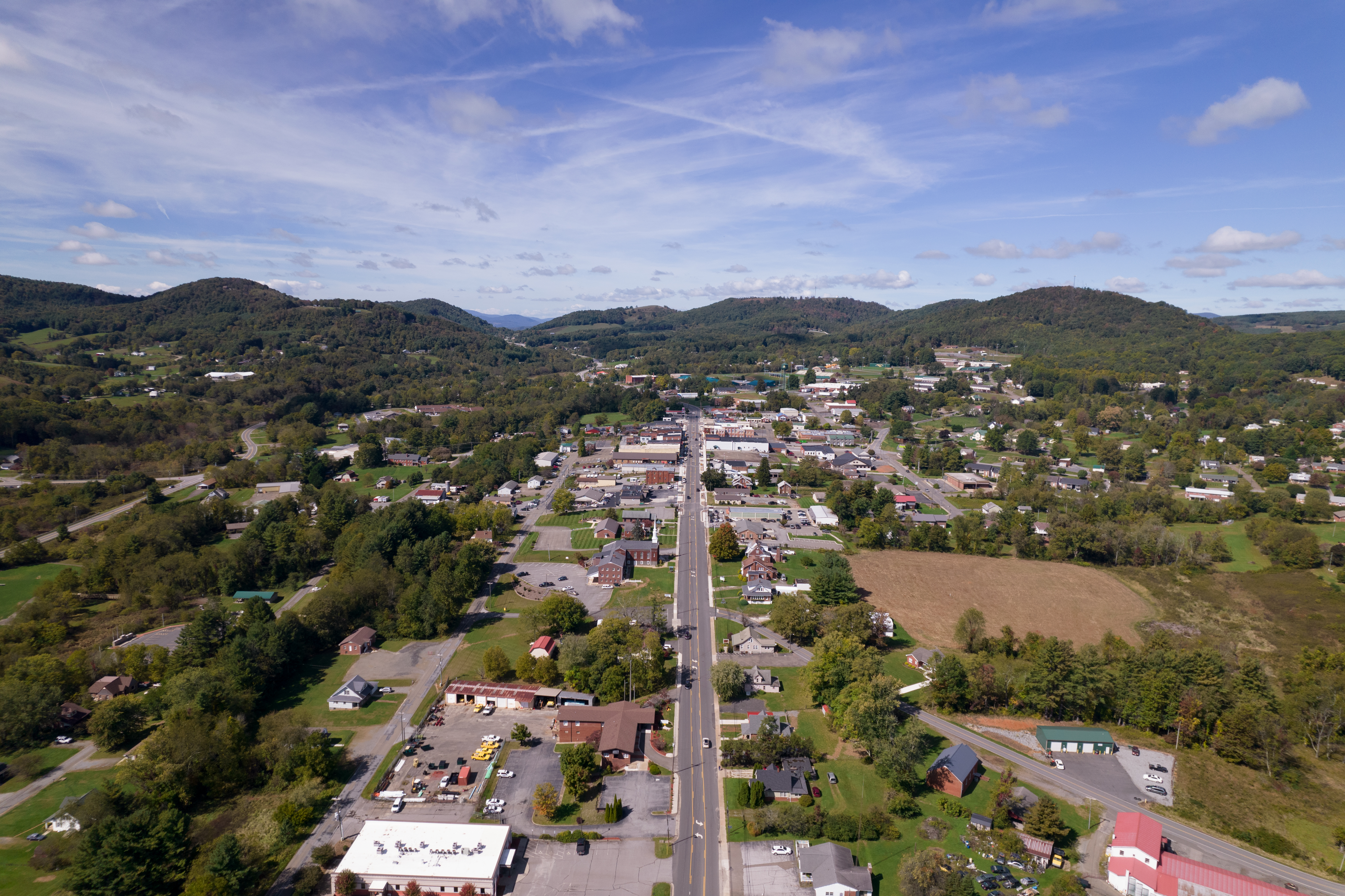
- Aerial view of Sparta

- Seal

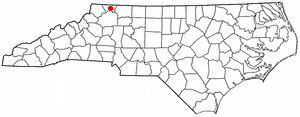
- Coordinates: 36°30′12″N 81°07′18″W
- Country: United States
- State: North Carolina
- County: Alleghany
- Named for: Sparta, the Greek city-state

Government
  - Mayor: Wes Brinegar

Area
  - Total: 2.36 sq mi (6.11 km^{2})
  - Land: 2.35 sq mi (6.08 km^{2})
  - Water: 0.0077 sq mi (0.02 km^{2})
- Elevation: 2,861 ft (872 m)

Population (2020)
  - Total: 1,834
  - Density: 780.8/sq mi (301.47/km^{2})
- Time zone: UTC-5 (Eastern (EST))
  - Summer (DST): UTC-4 (EDT)
- ZIP code: 28675
- Area code: 336
- FIPS code: 37-63680
- GNIS feature ID: 2407378
- Website: www.townofsparta.org

Sparta is a town and the county seat of Alleghany County, North Carolina, United States. As of the 2020 census, the population of the town was 1,834.

== History ==
James H. Parks, an early businessman whose store stood near the present location of the ABC store, was one of three men who donated land for the county seat in 1866. Parks is credited with suggesting the name "Sparta", after the Greek city-state.

Noteworthy businesses established in Sparta included The Alleghany News (1889), the Bank of Sparta (1902), and the second store purchased by home improvement giant Lowe's (1949). Sparta's first shopping center, Trojan Village, opened in 1977, followed by Sparta Plaza in 1986.

The Alleghany County Courthouse and Jarvis House are listed on the National Register of Historic Places.

On August 9, 2020, the town was the epicenter of a moderate earthquake that was felt as far as Georgia. The earthquake, which registered as a 5.1 on the Richter magnitude scale, was the largest earthquake to occur in North Carolina in over 100 years.

== Geography ==
According to the United States Census Bureau, the town has a total area of 2.4 square miles (6.2 km^{2}), of which 0.0077 square miles (0.02 km^{2}), or 0.32%, is water.

== Climate ==
Climate data for SPARTA 3.5 SSW, NC, 1991-2020 normals
Month	Jan	Feb	Mar	Apr	May	Jun	Jul	Aug	Sep	Oct	Nov	Dec	Year
Mean daily maximum °F (°C)	44.5 (6.9)	46.4 (8.0)	52.8 (11.6)	63.4 (17.4)	70.6 (21.4)	79.8 (26.6)	83.6 (28.7)	82.1 (27.8)	75.0 (23.9)	65.8 (18.8)	54.8 (12.7)	46.2 (7.9)	63.8 (17.7)
Daily mean °F (°C)	33.4 (0.8)	35.4 (1.9)	42.1 (5.6)	51.6 (10.9)	59.9 (15.5)	68.5 (20.3)	72.7 (22.6)	70.9 (21.6)	63.9 (17.7)	53.5 (11.9)	43.4 (6.3)	36.0 (2.2)	52.6 (11.4)
Mean daily minimum °F (°C)	22.3 (−5.4)	24.4 (−4.2)	31.3 (−0.4)	39.8 (4.3)	49.2 (9.6)	57.1 (13.9)	61.7 (16.5)	59.6 (15.3)	52.7 (11.5)	41.2 (5.1)	31.9 (−0.1)	25.8 (−3.4)	41.4 (5.2)
Average precipitation inches (mm)	4.46 (113)	3.15 (80)	4.91 (125)	5.36 (136)	5.48 (139)	4.87 (124)	5.23 (133)	4.93 (125)	5.13 (130)	4.52 (115)	4.54 (115)	4.51 (115)	57.09 (1,450)
Average snowfall inches (cm)	5.3 (13)	4.2 (11)	3.1 (7.9)	1.0 (2.5)	0.0 (0.0)	0.0 (0.0)	0.0 (0.0)	0.0 (0.0)	0.0 (0.0)	0.0 (0.0)	0.3 (0.76)	4.7 (12)	18.6 (47)
Average precipitation days (≥ 0.01 in)	6.2	7.2	7.8	7.8	10.2	11.0	11.3	11.1	8.1	6.9	6.6	6.9	101.1
Average snowy days (≥ 0.1 in)	1.5	2.2	0.8	0.3	0.0	0.0	0.0	0.0	0.0	0.0	0.3	1.6	6.7
Source: NOAA

== Demographics ==
Historical population
Census	Pop.	Note	%±
1890	95		—
1900	501		427.4%
1910	199		−60.3%
1920	159		−20.1%
1930	466		193.1%
1940	648		39.1%
1950	620		−4.3%
1960	1,047		68.9%
1970	1,304		24.5%
1980	1,687		29.4%
1990	1,957		16.0%
2000	1,817		−7.2%
2010	1,770		−2.6%
2020	1,834		3.6%
U.S. Decennial Census

=== 2020 census ===
Sparta racial composition
Race	Number	Percentage
White (non-Hispanic)	1,329	72.46%
Black or African American (non-Hispanic)	35	1.91%
Native American	6	0.33%
Asian	10	0.55%
Pacific Islander	1	0.05%
Other/Mixed	59	3.22%
Hispanic or Latino	394	21.48%

As of the 2020 United States census, there were 1,834 people, 732 households, and 409 families residing in the town.

=== 2000 census ===
As of the census of 2000, there were 1,817 people, 825 households, and 441 families residing in the town. The population density was 765.2 inhabitants per square mile (295.4/km^{2}). There were 922 housing units at an average density of 388.3 units per square mile (149.9 units/km^{2}). The racial makeup of the town was 94.06% White, 1.98% African American, 0.17% Native American, 0.55% Asian, 0.06% Pacific Islander, 2.20% from other races, and 0.99% from two or more races. Hispanic or Latino of any race were 7.71% of the population.

There were 825 households, out of which 22.5% had children under the age of 18 living with them, 39.0% were married couples living together, 12.0% had a female householder with no husband present, and 46.5% were non-families. 41.9% of all households were made up of individuals, and 22.5% had someone living alone who was 65 years of age or older. The average household size was 2.01 and the average family size was 2.71.

In the town, the population was spread out, with 18.1% under the age of 18, 8.3% from 18 to 24, 24.3% from 25 to 44, 25.3% from 45 to 64, and 24.1% who were 65 years of age or older. The median age was 44 years. For every 100 females, there were 85.0 males. For every 100 females age 18 and over, there were 80.1 males.

The median income for a household in the town was $22,474, and the median income for a family was $37,596. Males had a median income of $23,304 versus $18,281 for females. The per capita income for the town was $14,237. About 10.6% of families and 18.3% of the population were below the poverty line, including 17.0% of those under age 18 and 33.0% of those age 65 or over.

== Notable locations ==
- The Sparta Teapot Museum (now permanently closed).
- The Dr. Grabow American pipe smoking manufacture, has been based in Sparta since 1943.

== Notable people ==
- Boyden Carpenter (1909–1995), bluegrass artist
- Zach Galifianakis (born 1969), American actor, comedian, musician and writer
- Del Reeves (1932–2007), country singer
