= Mid-Atlantic Championship =

Professional golf tournament

Tournament information
- Location: Potomac, Maryland
- Established: 2007
- Course: TPC Potomac at Avenel Farm
- Par: 70
- Length: 7,160 yards (6,550 m)
- Tour: Web.com Tour
- Format: Stroke play
- Prize fund: US$600,000
- Month played: May/June
- Final year: 2013

Tournament record score
- Aggregate: 255 Steve Wheatcroft (2011)
- To par: −29 as above

Final champion
- (United States) Michael Putnam
- Location in the United States Location in Maryland

The Mid-Atlantic Championship was a professional golf tournament on the Web.com Tour played at TPC Potomac at Avenel Farm. Proceeds from the Mid-Atlantic Championship benefited the Salute Military Golf Association.

== History ==
From 2007 to 2011, it was played as the Melwood Prince George's County Open. It was renamed the Neediest Kids Championship in 2012, and benefited Neediest Kids

In 2010 and 2011, it was played on the University of Maryland Golf Course in College Park, Maryland. From 2007 to 2009, it was played at the Country Club at Woodmore in Mitchellville, Maryland. Since 2012, it has been played at TPC Potomac at Avenel Farm in Potomac, Maryland. The 2013 purse was $600,000, with $108,000 going to the winner.

In 2013, Mid-Atlantic Championship organizer IGP Sports & Entertainment Group was acquired by IMG.

== Winners ==
Year	Winner	Score	To par	Margin of victory	Runner(s)-up	Venue
Mid-Atlantic Championship
2013	(United States) Michael Putnam	273	−7	2 strokes	(United States) Chesson Hadley	TPC Potomac
Neediest Kids Championship
2012	(Sweden) David Lingmerth	272	−8	1 stroke	(United States) Casey Wittenberg	TPC Potomac
Melwood Prince George's County Open
2011	(United States) Steve Wheatcroft	255	−29	12 strokes	(United States) Ryan Armour (Canada) Jon Mills	University of Maryland GC
2010	(United States) Tommy Gainey	267	−17	1 stroke	(United States) Frank Lickliter (South Korea) Jin Park	University of Maryland GC
2009	(Sweden) Mathias Grönberg	269	−19	6 strokes	(United States) Justin Bolli (United States) Robert Damron	CC at Woodmore
2008	(United States) Jeff Klauk	276	−12	1 stroke	(United States) Jeff Brehaut (United States) David Mathis	CC at Woodmore
2007	(United States) Paul Claxton	270	−18	1 stroke	(United States) James Driscoll (South Africa) Jaco van Zyl	CC at Woodmore
