= Country Club at Woodmore =

Private country club in Maryland, US

Coordinates: 38°56′4″N 76°47′55″W

The Country Club at Woodmore is a private country club, golf course, and gated community in Mitchellville, an unincorporated and affluent predominantly African-American community in Prince George's County, Maryland, United States. The nearby gated community, Woodmore, is also unincorporated.

Founded as the Beaver Dam Golf and Country Club in 1923, it was renamed the Prince George's Golf and Country Club in 1941. In 1979 its golf course, designed by Donald Ross, was purchased by the Maryland National Capitol Park and Planning Commission, precipitating the move to its present location.

The golf course was designed by Arnold Palmer, Ed Seay, and Algie Pulley, and opened in 1981.

The first black member was admitted in 1992. In 1994–1995, fourteen female members sued Woodmore Country Club in a discrimination case, winning full membership rights. They were represented by one of the members, Linda Hitt Thatcher of Mitchellville.

Championship events hosted by Woodmore include the 2002 U.S. Senior Open qualifier and the Nationwide Tour's Melwood Prince George's County Open from 2007 to 2009.

Famous members include convicted lobbyist Jack Abramoff.

== In the popular culture ==
The soap opera Beyond the Gates happens within Woodmore and its country club.
