= Leonid Teyf =

Russian-Israeli white collar criminal

- לאוניד טייף
- Born: Byelorussian Soviet Socialist Republic
- Occupation: business executive
- Known for: white-collar crime
- Spouse: Tatyana Anatolyevna Teyf (2005-17; divorced)
- Children: 3

Leonid Isaakovich Teyf (Russian: Леонид Исаакович Тейф, Hebrew: לאוניד טייף) is a Russian-Israeli businessman and white-collar criminal. He served as the deputy director of Voentorg, a company that contracted with the Russian Ministry of Defense to provide goods and services to the Russian Military.

In December 2018 Teyf and his wife were arrested by FBI agents and his mansion in Raleigh, North Carolina was raided as part of an investigation into a money laundering and murder-for-hire scheme. Teyf was alleged to have profited $150 million in a kickback scheme involving the Russian Government. On March 19, 2021, the United States Government dropped 47 counts out of a 50-count indictment against Teyf, including the charges of money laundering and murder-for-hire. Teyf pled guilty to bribing a federal agent $10,000 to deport the son of his housekeeper, with whom he suspected his wife was having an affair; to lying on his visa application about his anticipated yearly salary; and to omitting his financial holdings in a foreign bank account in his 2012 tax returns. Teyf agreed to forfeit $5.9 million, and agreed to be deported upon conclusion of his 5-year prison sentence.

== Personal life ==
Leonid Teyf was born in the Byelorussian Soviet Socialist Republic (modern-day Belarus). Teyf is a dual citizen of Israel and Russia and has traveling visas from Belarus, Serbia, and the United States. In 2005 Teyf married Tatyana Anatolyevna Teyf in Russia. They have three children. He and his family immigrated from Russia to the United States in 2010 and took up residence in Raleigh, North Carolina. Teyf purchased the Painter House, a mansion in North Ridge Country Club, in 2014. The couple filed for divorce in 2017. Tatyana later told authorities that she was a victim of domestic violence, stating that Teyf beat her and, in one incident, lit her clothes that she was wearing on fire.

== Criminal investigation ==
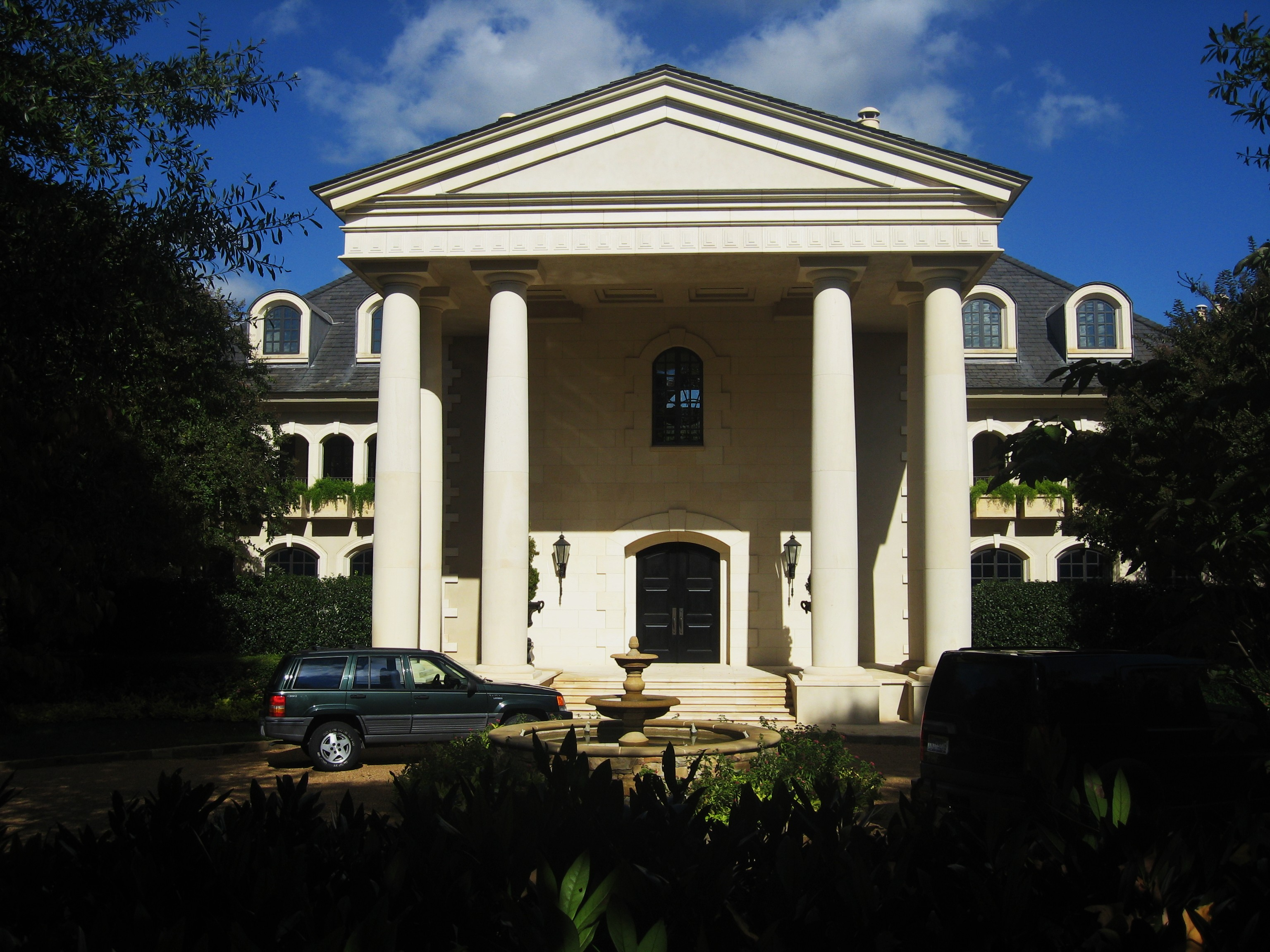
The Teyf's 17,000 square foot home in North Ridge Country Club, which was raided by FBI agents in December 2018.

The allegations in the Indictment against Mr. Teyf were as follows: In February 2018 Teyf told a confidential source who, unknown to Teyf, was working undercover for the Federal Bureau of Investigation, that he believed his wife was having an affair with their live-in housekeeper's son. Teyf expressed wanting to pay someone to get the son to confess to the affair and then overdose him on drugs. Teyf devised a plan to plant $15,000 worth of narcotics in the housekeeper's son's car so that he would arrested and deported back to Russia. Teyf fired his housekeeper, whose husband and son also lived in the Teyf's mansion, and had them removed from the residence. According to an FBI affidavit, the housekeeper's son was no longer in the U.S. legally. The confidential source told authorities that Teyf planned to have the son kidnapped, taken into the woods, forced to admit on video to having a sexual relationship with Tatyana Teyf, and then killed. In March 2017, and again in April 2018, Teyf paid John Patrick Cotter, a lifelong friend and business associate, to meet with agents from the U.S. Department of Homeland Security and persuade to investigate the housekeeper's son for either a fraudulent marriage or firearms possession. On May 23, 2018 Teyf and Cotter met with a Department of Homeland Security special agent at a restaurant in Raleigh where Cotter suggested that Teyf could provide a boat, vehicle or cash as an incentive for the special agent to investigate. Teyf and Cotter agreed to pay the special agent $25,000 for an "investigation that would result in the arrest and deportation" of the son. Cotter helped Teyf provide $10,000 for a down payment to the special agent, and promised the additional $15,000 once the son had been deported. They met with the agent again in July and August 2018 and each meeting was recorded on audio and video. During that time, Teyf also hired a private investigator, Stephen Myers, to follow the son and to install GPS tracking devices in the cars of Teyf's wife, eldest daughter, and the housekeeper's son. Myers was arrested and charged with cyber stalking and felony possession of a controlled substance.

In December 2018 Teyf and his wife were arrested after FBI agents raided their $5 million mansion in North Ridge Country Club. They were detained by the Wake County Sheriff's Office. The couple were indicted on 29 combined charges including money laundering, conspiracy in a series of money laundering, aiding and abetting in money laundering, bribery of a public official, murder for hire, and possession of a firearm with an obliterated serial number.

The FBI later raided a $500,000 condominium on Glenwood Avenue in downtown Raleigh that is owned by the Teyfs, who used it as a safe house. Federal agents found money and weapons, including AK-47s, an SKS, and a Soviet semi-automatic rifle, in the property. They also raided a building on East Hargett Street owned by the Teyfs.

According to a U.S. Homeland Security report, one of the U.S. government's key sources in their case against Teyf worked security for him in Russia. The informant told federal agents that he had hand delivered three large shipments of cash to a Russian defense minister. The payments were part of a kickback scheme involving the Russian Military and a company owned by Teyf. The source also told agents that Teyf had ordered him to offer $400,000 to Russian agents once the Russian government opened an investigation into Teyf's financial scheme. Teyf profited off of the $150 million kickback scheme, using offshore bank accounts and foreign shell companies to launder funds into his American bank accounts.

Since December 2010 Teyf had opened over 70 financial accounts at four separate banks and wired money into these accounts from Belize, Panama, Seychelles, and the British Virgin Islands.

Teyf purchased over $400,000 worth of Mercedes-Benz luxury cars and more than $2.5 million worth of art.

Teyf reportedly provided Russian army catering contracts to a company owned by Yevgeny Prigozhin, who was indicted by Robert Mueller following his investigation into the 2016 United States presidential election.

In January 2019 new documents from the investigation charged Alexey Vladimirovich Timofeev and Olesya Yuryevna Timofeeva in the case. Timofeeva was charged with one count of conspiracy to harbor aliens. Timofeev, who worked for Teyf as the president of CTK Transportation Inc., one of the businesses used in the money laundering scheme, was charged with seven counts of money laundering and spending laundered money and one count of conspiracy to harbor illegal aliens. Later that month Teyf's son, Grigory, admitted to having $15 million in three bank accounts that Teyf had opened for him prior to being arrested. Grigory, at the time a student at the University of North Carolina at Greensboro, was asked by federal prosecutor Jason Kellhofer if he was being groomed to take over his father's business affairs.

A trial was proposed for April 2019 by District Judge Louise Flanagan.

In October 2019 Teyf was indicted by a federal grand jury in Utah after court documents revealed that he was involved in a trucking company scheme, paying more than one million dollars in bribes to the Utah FedEx ground hub manager.

Teyf pleaded guilty to the felonies of bribery of a public official, visa fraud, and making false statements on his tax returns, all felonies. He was released after serving five years in local and federal custody, and was to be deported. Tatiana Teyf pleaded guilty to the felony of making false statements in her naturalization process, and sentenced to time served. The Teyfs agreed to forfeit $5.9 million they had in banks, as well as various amounts of seized cash, and Leonid Teyf agreed to pay a $99,000 penalty for the tax violation.
