= Finley Golf Course =

Golf course in Chapel Hill, North Carolina

UNC Finley Golf Course
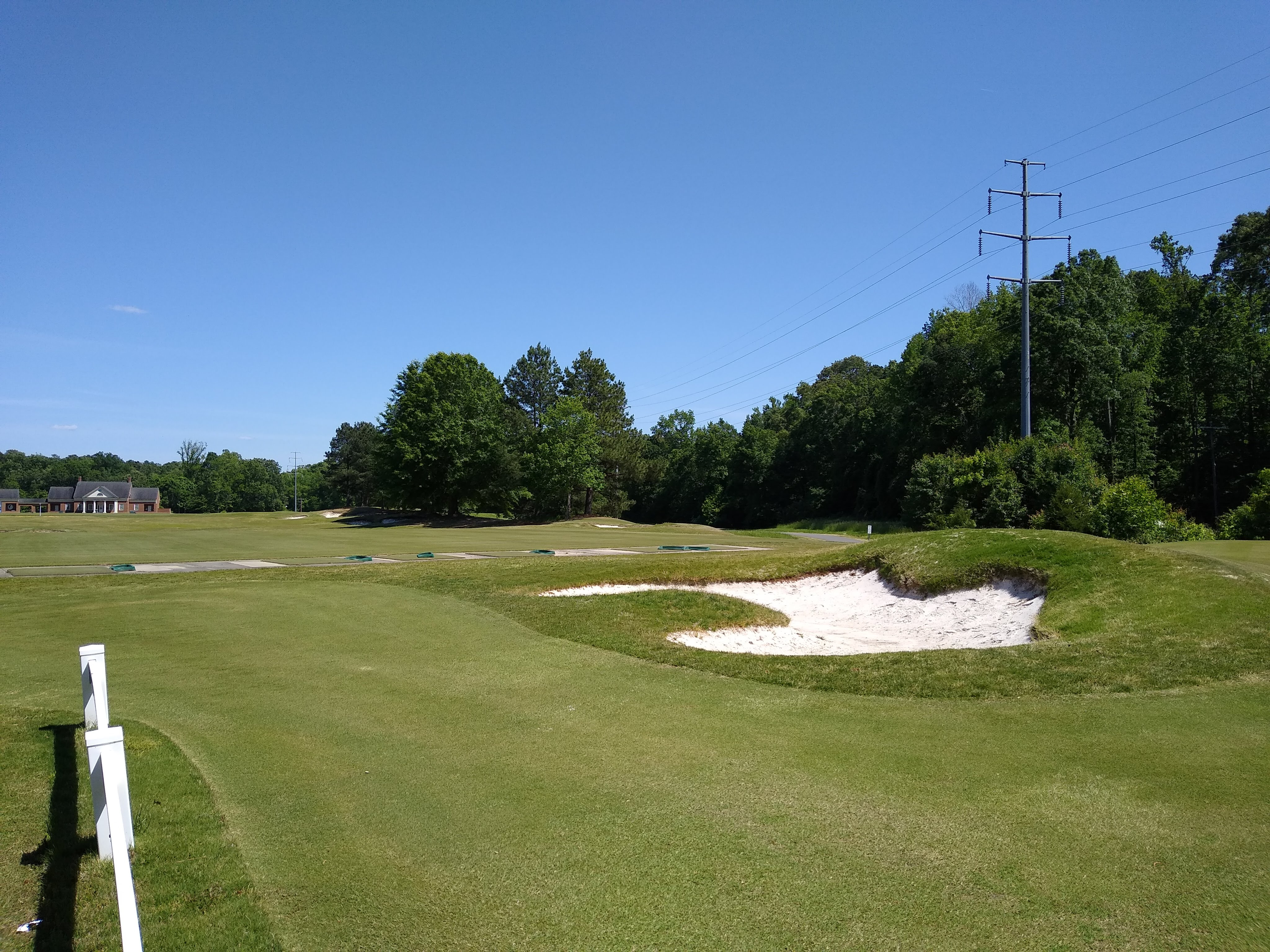
- Interactive map of UNC Finley Golf Course
- 35.90°N 79.02°W

Club information
- Location: Chapel Hill, NC, USA
- Established: 1949
- Type: Public / University
- Owner: University of North Carolina at Chapel Hill
- Operator: University of North Carolina at Chapel Hill
- Tota holes: 18
- Tournaments: A. E. Finley Executive Cup
- Website: uncfinley.com
- Designed by: George Cobb; Tom Fazio; Davis Love III
- Par: 70
- Length: 7,084 yds
- Course rating: 74.6/141
- Course record: Grant Roscich 61

UNC Finley Golf Course in Chapel Hill, North Carolina, is the home of the North Carolina Tar Heels Men's and Women's golf teams. It was originally built by Raleigh businessman A. E. Finley in 1949 to a design by George Cobb. Further holes were added in the 1980s along with renovation of the clubhouse. In 1999, designer Tom Fazio remodeled the course into a par 72 layout with five sets of tees ranging from 4,981 to 7,220 yards in length. Most recently, Carolina Golf Legend, Davis Love III renovated the course in 2023, transforming it into a par 70 layout, creating a unique challenge for the Men's and Women's golf teams. The course notably hosts the annual Ruth's Chris Tarheel Invitational and has been a host site for NCAA and USGA Regional tournaments. The current course record is 62 and held by PGA TOUR player and Tarheel alumni, David Ford.

== Scorecard ==
#	1	2	3	4	5	6	7	8	9	Out
Par	3	4	3	4	4	3	4	5	4	34
Yds	210	468	159	331	508	185	467	519	489	3,336
SI	12	6	18	16	2	8	10	14	4	

#	10	11	12	13	14	15	16	17	18	In
Par	4	4	5	4	3	5	4	3	4	36
Yds	499	329	554	482	224	567	437	169	487	3748
SI	5	17	11	7	15	1	9	13	3	
