= Painter House =

Mansion in Raleigh, North Carolina, US

Coordinates: 35°52′22″N 78°37′10″W

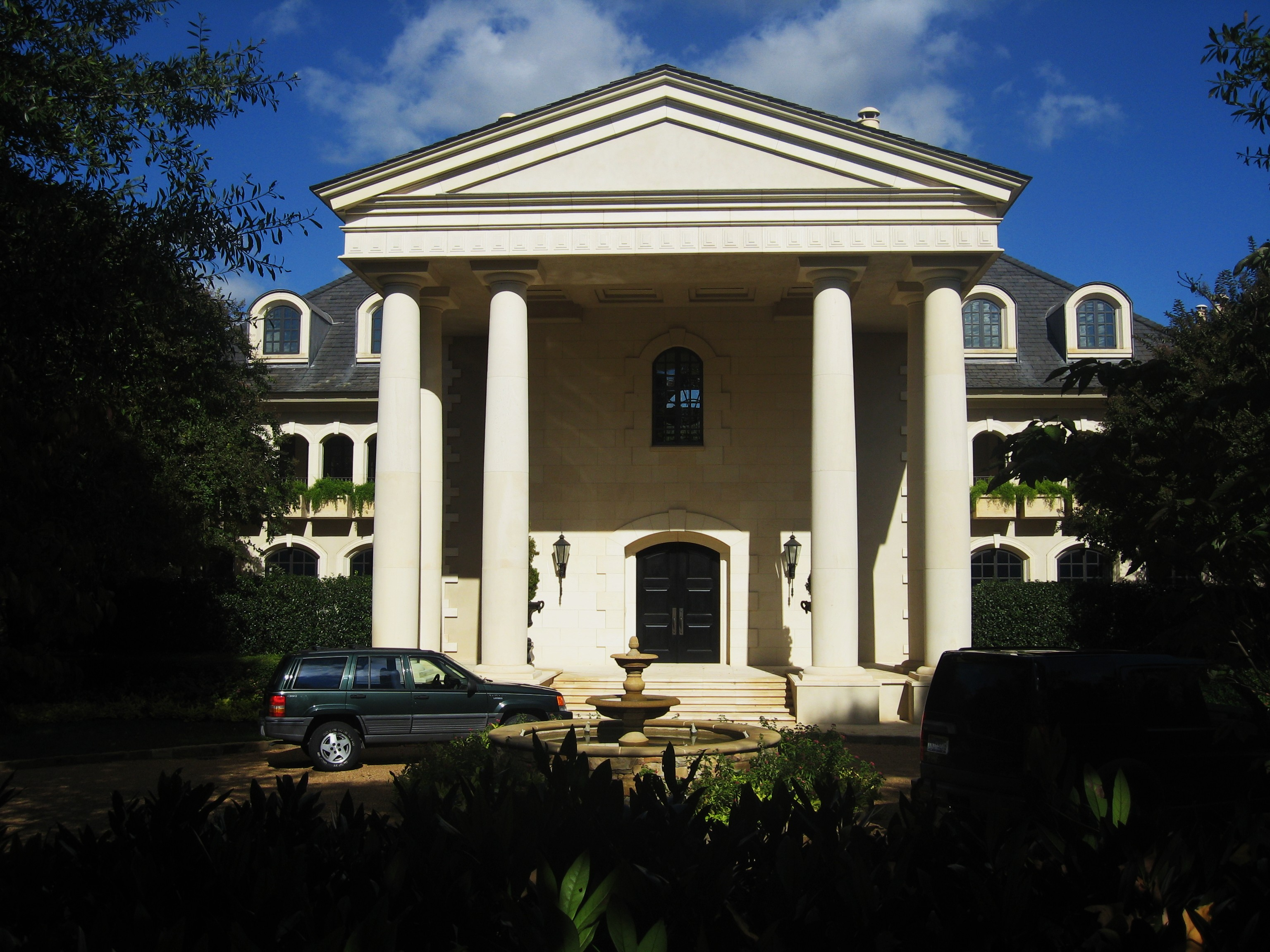
- The house in 2010

General information
- Status: active
- Type: private residence
- Architectural style: Greek Revival
- Location: 6510 New Market Way; Raleigh, North Carolina 27615
- Completed: 1998
- Owner: Dean Painter Jr.(previous); Wendy Petchul Painter (previous); Leonid Teyf (previous); Tatyana Teyf (current)

The Painter House is a mansion in Raleigh, North Carolina. Located in the North Ridge Estates neighborhood, adjacent to North Ridge Country Club, the home was originally owned by Dean Painter Jr. and Wendy Painter. It was later purchased by Russian-Israeli businessman Leonid Teyf. On December 5, 2018, the house was raided by the Federal Bureau of Investigation as part of a criminal investigation into Teyf's businesses.

== History ==
The house was built between 1998 and 2000 for Dean Painter Jr., a businessman, and his wife, the investor and socialite Wendy Petchul Painter. Following their divorce, the house was acquired solely by Wendy Painter. She was known to host lavish fundraisers and social events at the home. The house was sold following Wendy Painter's death in 2010.

The 16,856-square-foot house, located along the 18th green in North Ridge Country Club, sits on 1.8 acres. The house includes a 5,000-square-foot living room, a 1,000-square-foot foyer, nine fireplaces, eight bedrooms, eight bathrooms, six half-bathrooms, two elevators, a heated four-car garage, a catering kitchen, an imperial staircase, hydronic heated limestone floors, two laundry rooms, a safe room, a gym, a wine cellar and tasting room, and a sauna. The exterior of Painter House includes a 2,900-square-feet of covered porches and verandas. The estate includes two outdoor bars, a fire pit, an outdoor spa, and a saltwater pool.

In 2014, the home was purchased by Russian-Israeli businessman Leonid Teyf. On December 5, 2018, the home was raided by the Federal Bureau of Investigation as part of an investigation into Teyf's criminal activity. Federal agents seized cash, diamond jewelry, art, and luxury cars from the property as part of the investigation into the Teyf family's involvement in multimillion-dollar businesses, murder-for-hire, money laundering, and a $150 million kickback scheme with the Russian military. Leonid Teyf pleaded guilty to money laundering, visa fraud, making false statements on tax returns, and bribery of a public official and was imprisoned. Teyf surrendered $6 million in assets but kept the mansion, now owned solely by his wife, Tatyana Teyf.

In 2019, the house was listed as the fifth-most expensive house in Wake County.

In August 2024, the house was withdrawn from a luxury auction. It was previously listed on the market for $10 million. It sold in July 2025 for $4.4 million.
