= Woodmore, Maryland =

- Census-designated place
- Nickname: Mitchellville Area
- Location of Woodmore, Maryland (2000 map)
- Coordinates: 38°56′5″N 76°46′42″W
- Country: United States
- State: Maryland
- County: Prince George's

Area
  - Total: 6.61 sq mi (17.12 km^{2})
  - Land: 6.54 sq mi (16.95 km^{2})
  - Water: 0.062 sq mi (0.16 km^{2})
- Elevation: 160 ft (50 m)

Population (2020)
  - Total: 4,513
  - Density: 689.4/sq mi (266.18/km^{2})
- Time zone: UTC−5 (Eastern (EST))
  - Summer (DST): UTC−4 (EDT)
- Postal code: 20721
- FIPS code: 24-86710
- GNIS feature ID: 0598278

Woodmore is an unincorporated area and census-designated place (CDP 86710) in Prince George's County, Maryland, United States. Per the 2020 census, the population was 4,513. The CDP is located within the boundaries of Route 193 (Enterprise Road) to the west, Church Road to the east, Route 214 (Central Avenue) to the south and Route 50 to the north. Woodmore Road runs east and west through the center. It contains a large gated community and country club, developments of Woodmore Meadows, and Woodmore South on the south side, as well as various other custom built homes and farmland.

Off Enterprise Road sits the development of Kingsford. It is contiguous with Mitchellville, Maryland CDP, and historically had a Mitchellville mailing address, for many years served by the South Bowie/Mitchellville Post Office with zip code 20721 and has been considered part of Mitchellville. The Woodmore and Mitchellville community is notable as one of the most affluent predominantly African-American communities in the United States.

The gated community "Woodmore" is centered on the Country Club at Woodmore. The community is planned to consist of 398 single-family homes on 799 acres (3.2 km^{2}). From 1974 to 2025, the Six Flags America amusement park was located within the boundaries of the CDP before it permanently closed.

== History ==
The first colonial owner of the Woodmore site was Thomas Spriggs, who in 1698 acquired 500 acres (2.0 km^{2}) of what was then known as the forest of Prince George's County in the Crown Colony of Maryland.

The first house in the area was a two-story brick house named Pleasant Prospect (still standing at 12806 Woodmore Road)., built c. 1798 by Dr. Isaac Ducket, the husband of Spriggs' granddaughter. He also doubled the size of the estate to over 1,000 acres.

Pleasant Prospect was inherited by Ducket's son-in-law, John Contee, and then by his son, also John Contee, who became indebted and sold the estate to the Bowies, then the Washington D.C. lumber magnates the Walkers. Although the Walker family sold the house in 1982, Walker descendants also continued to own land and farm on the south side of Woodmore Road, part of which farmland was sold to create Woodmore Meadows.

Much of the land in Woodmore prior to the 1980s was owned by various farming families, the most prominent of which being the Walker family and the Shatenstein family, the latter of which owned large tracts of land along the northern and southern boundaries of Woodmore Road.

In 1977 a portion of the Shatenstein property located along the northern boundary of Woodmore Road, was purchased by the county to replace the former Prince George's Golf and Country Club, formerly located in Cheverly. The Country Club at Woodmore was designed and the gated community planned through a joint venture between the County and GolfAmerica, a process which took 15 years as the seven area homeowner associations eventually merged. In 1995, the residue of the Shatenstein estate on the southern boundary was sold to Winchester Homes, who developed the Woodmore South community. In 2010 the U.S. Census Bureau redefined northern parts of the Woodmore CDP as the new Fairwood CDP.

== Geography ==
Woodmore is located at 38°56′5″N 76°46′42″W (38.934861, −76.778202).

According to the United States Census Bureau, the CDP has a total area of 6.6 square miles (17.1 km^{2}), of which 6.6 square miles (17.0 km^{2}) is land and 0.08 square miles (0.2 km^{2}), or 0.96%, is water.

=== Gated community ===
The Woodmore gated community has about 400 houses, including single family and townhouses. About 33% of the residents of the gated community are members of the Country Club at Woodmore; the two are, as described by Keisha Stewart of The Washington Post, "intertwined". Stewart described the Woodmore gated community as "one of Prince George's County's premier subdivisions" that "represents prestige and accomplishment for some, while for others it is a serene haven."

In 2005 the range of residences was from $400,000 to $2 million, with townhouses cheaper than single family houses. According to Stewart, in 2005, "$1 million houses [were] not uncommon in Woodmore."

== Demographics ==
Historical population
Census	Pop.	Note	%±
1990	2,874		—
2000	6,077		111.4%
2010	3,936		−35.2%
2020	4,513		14.7%
U.S. Decennial Census; 2010 2020

=== Racial and ethnic composition ===
Woodmore CDP, Maryland – Racial and ethnic composition Note: the US Census treats Hispanic/Latino as an ethnic category. This table excludes Latinos from the racial categories and assigns them to a separate category. Hispanics/Latinos may be of any race.
Race / Ethnicity (NH = Non-Hispanic)	Pop 2000	Pop 2010	Pop 2020	% 2000	% 2010	% 2020
White alone (NH)	1,706	378	350	28.07%	9.60%	7.76%
Black or African American alone (NH)	3,918	3,216	3,606	64.47%	81.71%	79.90%
Native American or Alaska Native alone (NH)	7	11	6	0.12%	0.28%	0.13%
Asian alone (NH)	178	78	91	2.93%	1.98%	2.02%
Native Hawaiian or Pacific Islander alone (NH)	1	0	0	0.02%	0.00%	0.00%
Other race alone (NH)	17	8	44	0.28%	0.20%	0.97%
Mixed race or Multiracial (NH)	127	107	205	2.09%	2.72%	4.54%
Hispanic or Latino (any race)	123	138	211	2.02%	3.51%	4.68%
Total	6,077	3,936	4,513	100.00%	100.00%	100.00%

=== 2020 census ===
As of the 2020 census, Woodmore had a population of 4,513. The median age was 47.7 years. 20.1% of residents were under the age of 18 and 21.1% of residents were 65 years of age or older. For every 100 females there were 87.8 males, and for every 100 females age 18 and over there were 83.1 males age 18 and over.

100.0% of residents lived in urban areas, while 0.0% lived in rural areas.

There were 1,517 households in Woodmore, of which 30.1% had children under the age of 18 living in them. Of all households, 58.2% were married-couple households, 10.8% were households with a male householder and no spouse or partner present, and 28.7% were households with a female householder and no spouse or partner present. About 18.8% of all households were made up of individuals and 7.8% had someone living alone who was 65 years of age or older.

There were 1,570 housing units, of which 3.4% were vacant. The homeowner vacancy rate was 0.5% and the rental vacancy rate was 8.3%.

=== 2000 census ===
There were 1,977 households, out of which 45.0% had children under the age of 18 living with them, 68.1% were married couples living together, 11.4% had a female householder with no husband present, and 16.7% were non-families.

12.7% of all households were made up of individuals, and 1.2% had someone living alone who was 65 years of age or older. The average household size was 3.07 and the average family size was 3.37.

In the CDP, the population was spread out, with 28.7% under the age of 18, 6.9% from 18 to 24, 29.9% from 25 to 44, 29.9% from 45 to 64, and 4.6% who were 65 years of age or older. The median age was 38 years. For every 100 females, there were 91.3 males. For every 100 females age 18 and over, there were 86.9 males.

The median income for a household in the CDP was $97,270, and the median income for a family was $103,438. Males had a median income of $65,638 versus $55,324 for females, making it one of the highest-income majority black jurisdictions in the country.

The per capita income for the CDP was $37,734. About 2.0% of families and 3.5% of the population were below the poverty line, including 2.6% of those under age 18 and 6.0% of those age 65 or over. By the end of 2020, the CDP ranks # 7 among top 10 richest black communities in US, with an average family income of $103,438. Approximately 34% of households had incomes over $200,000.

=== Ancestry ===
Like most of Prince George's County, there is a significant population of residents with ancestry in Sub-Saharan Africa. 14.4% of the population (607) shares this ancestry with 21% of residents claiming Nigeria as their country of birth. 16.8% of residents claim Sierra Leone as their country of birth. 3.9% of residents claim Ghana as their country of birth.

There is also a significant portion of residents from the West Indies. 16.9% of residents claim Jamaica as their country of birth. 12.7% of residents claim Guyana as their country of birth. 5% of residents claim Trinidad and Tobago as their country of birth.

== Government ==
Prince George's County Police Department District 2 Station in Brock Hall CDP, with a Bowie postal address, serves the community.

== Education ==
Woodmore CDP is zoned to schools in the Prince George's County Public Schools.

The majority Woodmore is zoned to Woodmore Elementary School. Most of the CDP is zoned to Ernest Everett Just Middle School and Benjamin Tasker Middle School. Most of the CDP is zoned to Charles Herbert Flowers High School, with portions zoned to Bowie High School.
