= University of Maryland Golf Course =

Home of the Maryland Terrapins men's and women's golf teams

- Interactive map of University of Maryland Golf Course
- 38.991°N 76.954°W

Club information
- Location: College Park, Maryland, US
- Established: 1955
- Type: Public / University
- Owner: University of Maryland, College Park
- Operator: University of Maryland, College Park
- Tota holes: 18
- Tournaments: multiple
- Website: golf.umd.edu
- Designed by: George Cobb, Bill Love, Brian Kington
- Par: 71
- Length: Terps tee: 7,007 yds Black tee: 6,672 yds White tee: 6,094 yds Red tee: 5,742 yds
- Course rating: 73.7/137

University of Maryland, College Park campus

The University of Maryland Golf Course in College Park, Maryland, is the home of the Maryland Terrapins men's and women's golf teams. The semi-private championship course was designed in 1955 by George Cobb, the course has been a longtime host of state and regional tournaments and hosts over 50,000 rounds of golf annually. The course is located in the northern perimeter of the University of Maryland, College Park's campus, and is home to a 45-station driving range and a 5,000-square-foot (460 m^{2}) putting green.

A 35,000-square-foot (3,300 m^{2}), plantation-style clubhouse, named Mulligan's Grill and Pub, is located on the course. Completed in 1999 for $3 million, Mulligan's houses a full-service bar, banquet facility, and pro shop. The golf course underwent a series of renovations from 2008 to 2009.

The Melwood Prince George's County Open, a Nationwide Tour event, was held at the golf course in 2010 and 2011. The 2016 Maryland Public Secondary Schools Athletic Association High school 4A/3A and 2A/1A state championships were also held here.
