= USS Aquamarine =

Yacht

History

United States
- Name: Siele (1926-1940); Sea Wolf (1940—1941); Aquamarine (1941—1947); Sea Wolf (1947—1954); Miss Ann (1954—)
- Builder: Pusey and Jones Corporation, Wilmington, Delaware
- Laid down: 1 December 1925
- Launched: 10 April 1926
- Acquired: delivered by builder: 13 July 1926; by Navy 13 January 1941
- Commissioned: by Navy 9 April 1941
- Decommissioned: by Navy 21 June 1946
- Identification: U.S. Official Number: 225735; Signal: MGDK (1926—1935); KMLS (1935—1941)
- Status: Charter Service on the Potomac River (2008)

General characteristics
- Type: Yacht
- Tonnage: 183 GRT, 124 Net tons
- Displacement: 220 long tons (224 t)
- Length: 124 ft (38 m) (overall); 113.4 ft (34.6 m) (registry)
- Beam: 20.6 ft (6.3 m) (Note: DANFS uses 20' 6" while the registry is clear at 20.6 (measurements given in feet and fractions of feet). Other references also give 20' 6", a difference of 1 inch, so the variance may be caused by measurement method.)
- Draft: 7 ft (2.1 m)
- Depth: 9.6 ft (2.9 m)
- Depth of hold: 9 ft 7 in (2.92 m)
- Propulsion: 2 x 300 hp Winton diesel engines, 2 shafts, 600 bhp (447 kW)
- Speed: 12 knots (22 km/h; 14 mph)
- Complement: 12 (yacht, registry); 36 (Navy)
- Armament: 2 × .30 caliber guns
- Siele (motor yacht)
- U.S. National Register of Historic Places
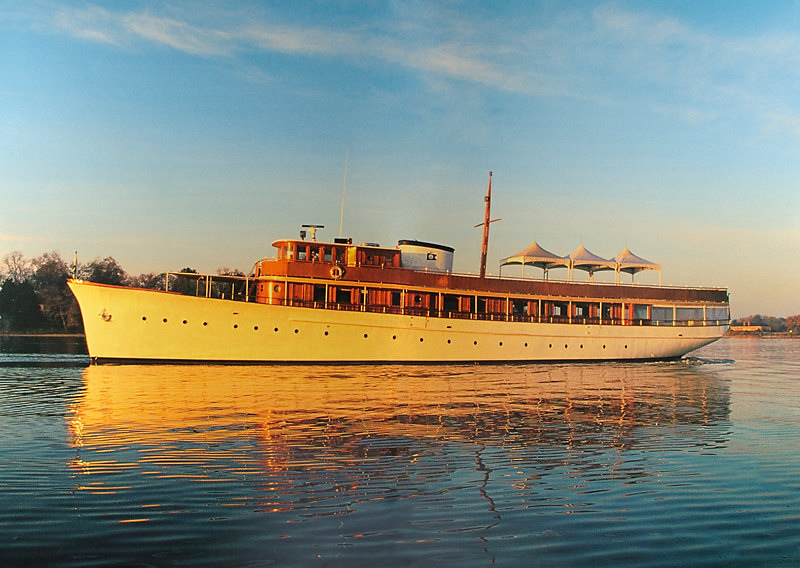
- Miss Ann in 2010

- Location within Virginia Location within the United States
- Location: Tides Inn, Carter Creek, Irvington, Virginia
- Coordinates: 37°39′48″N 76°26′1″W
- Built: 1926
- Architect: B. T. Dobson; Pusey & Jones Shipyard
- NRHP reference No.: 98001310
- Added to NRHP: 12 November 1998

USS Aquamarine (PYc-7) was the former yacht Siele launched in April 1926 by Pusey and Jones Corporation, Wilmington, Delaware. In 1940 Siele was sold and renamed Sea Wolf which was purchased by the Navy in January 1941 and commissioned Aquamarine in April. Though given a "patrol yacht, coastal" designation the yacht was assigned to the Naval Research Laboratory for acoustical research during World War II. After naval service the yacht was again under the name Sea Wolf until sold in 1954 and renamed Miss Ann, listed on the U.S. National Register of Historic Places in 1998.

== Construction ==
Siele was built to a design by Benjamin T. Dobson (Note: Usually seen in his advertisements and credits as B. T. Dobson (1890-1959) the marine architect was based in New Bedford specializing in designing diesel yachts. A collection of his designs is at the New Bedford Whaling Museum.) by Pusey and Jones Corporation, Wilmington, Delaware as yard hull 396, contract 1032 for John H. French, a Detroit banker. The keel was laid 1 December 1925. The yacht was christened by Mrs. French and launched 10 April 1926. Siele was delivered to the owner 13 July 1926.

Construction was steel with decks overlain by teak. The hull was divided into seven watertight compartments. The main deck superstructure was teak with a teak pilot house above. The deck house contained a dining room forward with galley, pantry, radio room and living room aft. Below were three double and three single staterooms with four baths. Dining and living room were walnut paneled with ivory Vehisote (Note: The material is described in Autobody News, "In Reverse: 120 Years of Body-Building Changes" with respect to use in automobile use as "Vehisote was lighter weight and more versatile for the growing size of vehicle and light truck bodies. The Agasote Millboard Company was founded in England in 1909, producing a sort of fiberboard made from recycled paper and glue formed into 4 × 8 foot sheets under extreme heat and pressure. (This sounds a lot like today’s plywood.) The process was brought to the U.S., and in 1915 various car companies began using the large sheets to create roofs on cars made of both wood and steel. The sheets were also known as "Vehisote", part of the "Homosote" (sic—see Homasote) family of products. Vehisote was a favorite material for building truck bodies in the 1920s.") trim and plate glass windows. Staterooms were similarly finished with all furnishings specifically designed to match and for their locations. Crew quarters were forward of the owner and guest quarters. The yacht was powered by two six cylinder, 300 horsepower (600 total) Winton diesel engines driving twin bronze screws.

== Private yacht ==
Siele was registered with U.S. Official Number 225735, signal MGDK with home port of Detroit, Michigan. Registry data shows a crew of twelve, 183 GRT, 124 Net tons, 113.4 ft (34.6 m) registry length, beam of 20.6 ft (6.3 m) and depth of 9.6 ft (2.9 m). The call sign was changed in 1935 to KMLS with the yacht shown in the register of 1939 as being owned by John H. French. (Note: Merchant Vessels of the United States, Year ended 30 June 1939 shows Siele (225735/KMLS) on page 481 being registered with French as the owner. On the previous page, 480, another yacht, named Sea Wolf (225364/WTSQ), a gasoline powered twin engine vessel, is shown as registered with Robert H. Wolfe as owner. The National Register of Historic Places nomination form is erroneous with respect of the sale taking place in 1936 as registers of the years to 1940 show otherwise.)

In 1940 Siele was sold to Robert H. Wolfe, of Columbus, Ohio, publisher of the Columbus Dispatch. Wolfe renamed and registered the yacht as Sea Wolf, the name of his previous and smaller yacht (225364/WTSQ).

== Naval service ==
Sea Wolf was bought by the Navy on 13 January 1941, and commissioned Aquamarine on 9 April 1941. She was named for the gemstone aquamarine.

Assigned to the Naval Research Laboratory (NRL), Washington, D.C., Aquamarine assisted in experimental work, chiefly underwater sound. (Note: Despite the PYc designation the vessel was not equipped for patrol duty nor did it function in any role other than research and as a Presidential yacht tender.) Although most of her experiments were conducted on the Potomac River and Chesapeake Bay, she also operated off New London, Connecticut, from 16 October to 4 November 1943, and off the Florida coast and in the Bahamas from 24 January 1944 to 18 April 1945. Most work was in acoustics with limited work with radar, mines, and underwater communications. During 1945 and 1946 Aquamarine had additional duty as special tender to the presidential yachts Potomac and Williamsburg.

Among the experiments was use of Aquamarine and Accentor for shallow water sound propagation research in the Potomac using frequencies of 70–400 Hz and sampling bottom sediment characteristics. NRL's Sound Division developed a ship quieting technique using bubbles produced at the bow using the yacht for experiments. The experiment used a pipe and fire hose with holes to produce the bubble cloud. The technique was found to reduce sound in the 20–30 kHz range by 20 db and was implemented on operational ships.

Aquamarine was decommissioned on 21 June 1946 and transferred to the Maritime Commission on 31 January 1947 for disposal.

== Return to private owners & abandonment ==
The Navy had made extensive modifications both to accommodate a Navy crew and for the NRL experiments. Registry information shows the vessel returned to the previous owner and continues showing Wolfe as owner into 1950. Other information shows the vessel was sold shortly after to Colonel E. M. Grimm of Columbus, Ohio, who had served in the Philippines during the war and was managing a company there and involved in Philippine politics. Though exact ownership is not clear from registry and the other information the heavily modified vessel, unsuitable for use as a luxury yacht was essentially abandoned until sold to She was sold in 1954 to Ennolls A. Stephens of Irvington, Virginia, owner of The Tides Inn, Irvington, and renamed Miss Ann.

== Miss Ann ==
Stephens had to essentially rebuild major portions of the vessel and had an arrangement with Grimm regarding the Winton diesels and Navy installed gyrocompass. In removing those for shipment to Grimm in the Philippines portions of the vessel had to be removed. Stephens, with naval architect John H. Wells, worked to restore the vessel as much as possible for private use at considerable expense. Among the changes were a new bow and stern adding 3 ft (0.9 m) to overall length, removing a rub rail added by the Navy and cutting down to the steel deck restoring the gunwales. Navy modifications to the living and other spaces were extensive and removed preserving much of the original woodwork. One of the Navy modifications Stephens notes were "two cylinders, approximately three feet in diameter each, through the deck and all the way through the ship" which were possibly part of the research in generating a bubble cloud to reduce noise as they somewhat fit the NRL description of pipes near the bow through which perforated fire hoses were passed. (Note: One thing is clear. The vessel lay abandoned as it was during Navy operation for about eight years and deteriorated badly.)

After the Coast Guard found the vessel in violation of rules regarding carrying passengers Stephens spent about a million dollars undertaking repairs below the water line to come into compliance. In those changes it was necessary to remove the original cabin work and fittings. The portions that could be saved were stored ashore.

In 2008, Miss Ann was sold to private interests who placed her in Charter Service on the Potomac River. Starting in 2019, she is docked at Evans Island in Monroe Bay, Colonial Beach, Virginia.

== See also ==
- United States Naval Research Laboratory
- Underwater Sound Laboratory at New London
