= Essington Hall =

Plantation and historic house in Mitchellville, Maryland, USA

Coordinates: 38°55′31″N 76°45′33″W

Essington Hall was a plantation and historic house on Old Mount Oak Road in Mitchellville, Maryland that encompassed much of the area. It was owned by John Mitchell, for whom the locality of Mitchellville was named.

The house was destroyed by 1974 but the cemetery remains and is maintained by the city of Bowie, Maryland.
