= North Ridge Country Club =

Country club and neighborhood in Raleigh, North Carolina

Coordinates: 35.8824163°N 78.6136282°W

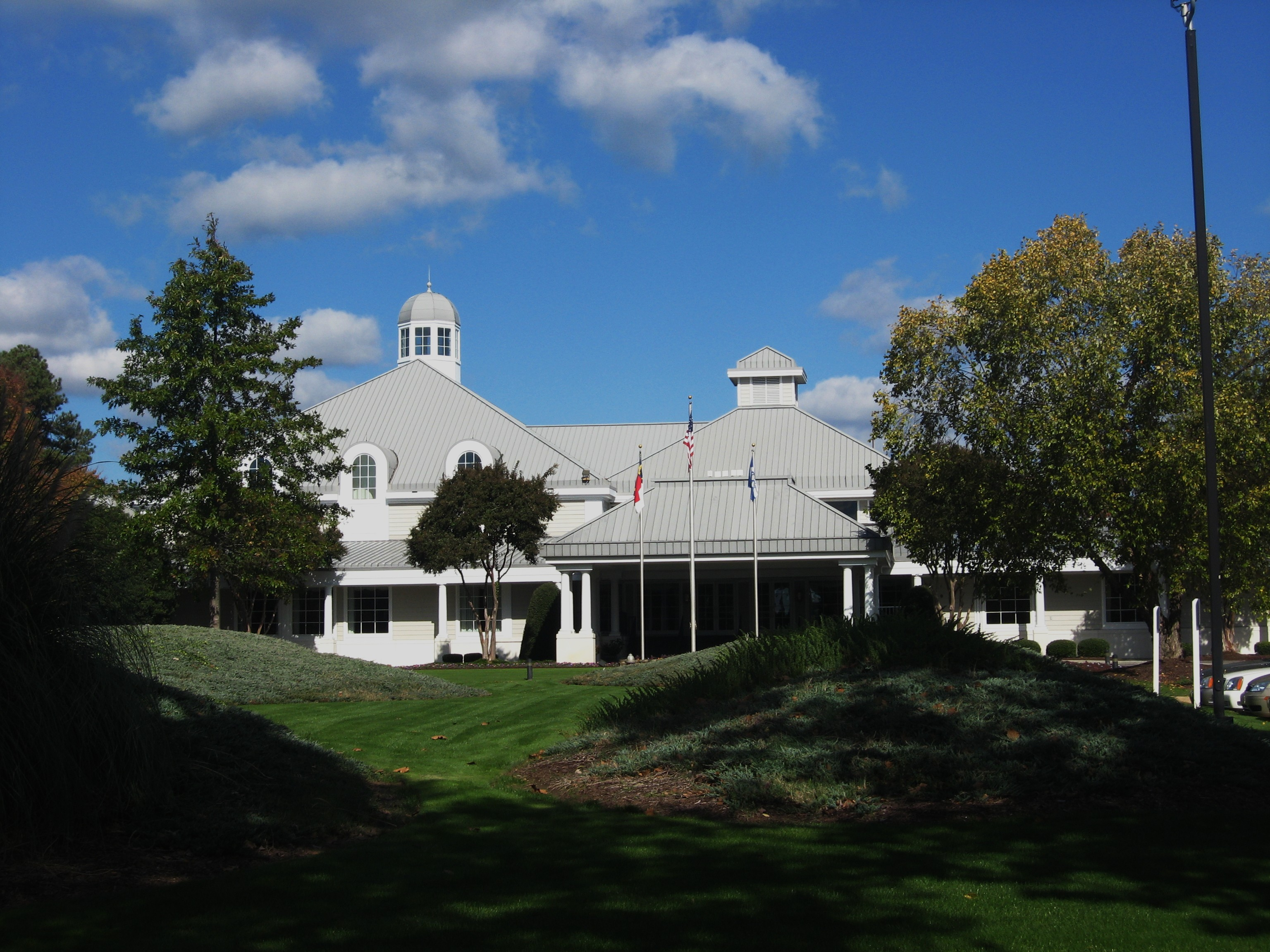
- Interactive map of North Ridge Country Club

Club information
- Location: Raleigh, North Carolina, United States
- Type: Private/Residential
- Total holes: 36
- Tournaments: North Ridge Cup

The Lakes
- Designed by: George Cobb; Gene Hamm

The Oaks
- Designed by: George Cobb; Gene Hamm

North Ridge Country Club is a member-owned country club located in northern Raleigh, North Carolina, along the North Ridge Estates neighborhood.

== Golfing and events ==
North Ridge has two 18-hole golf courses, The Lakes and The Oaks. The Lakes was built in 1967 and The Oaks was built in 1972. The courses were designed by Gene Hamm and George Cobb, and later updated by John LaFoy and Kris Spence The club hosts numerous charity events, golf tournaments, holiday parties, and other social events. The Club also hosts annual Fourth of July Fireworks, a pig pickin', and a garden club. North Ridge hosted the American Defender Classic from 1975 until 1981.

Along with the two golf courses, North Ridge Country Club has a pool and swim clubhouse, a 70,000-square-foot (6,500 m^{2}) club house, tennis courts, restaurant, tennis club house, and a fitness center.

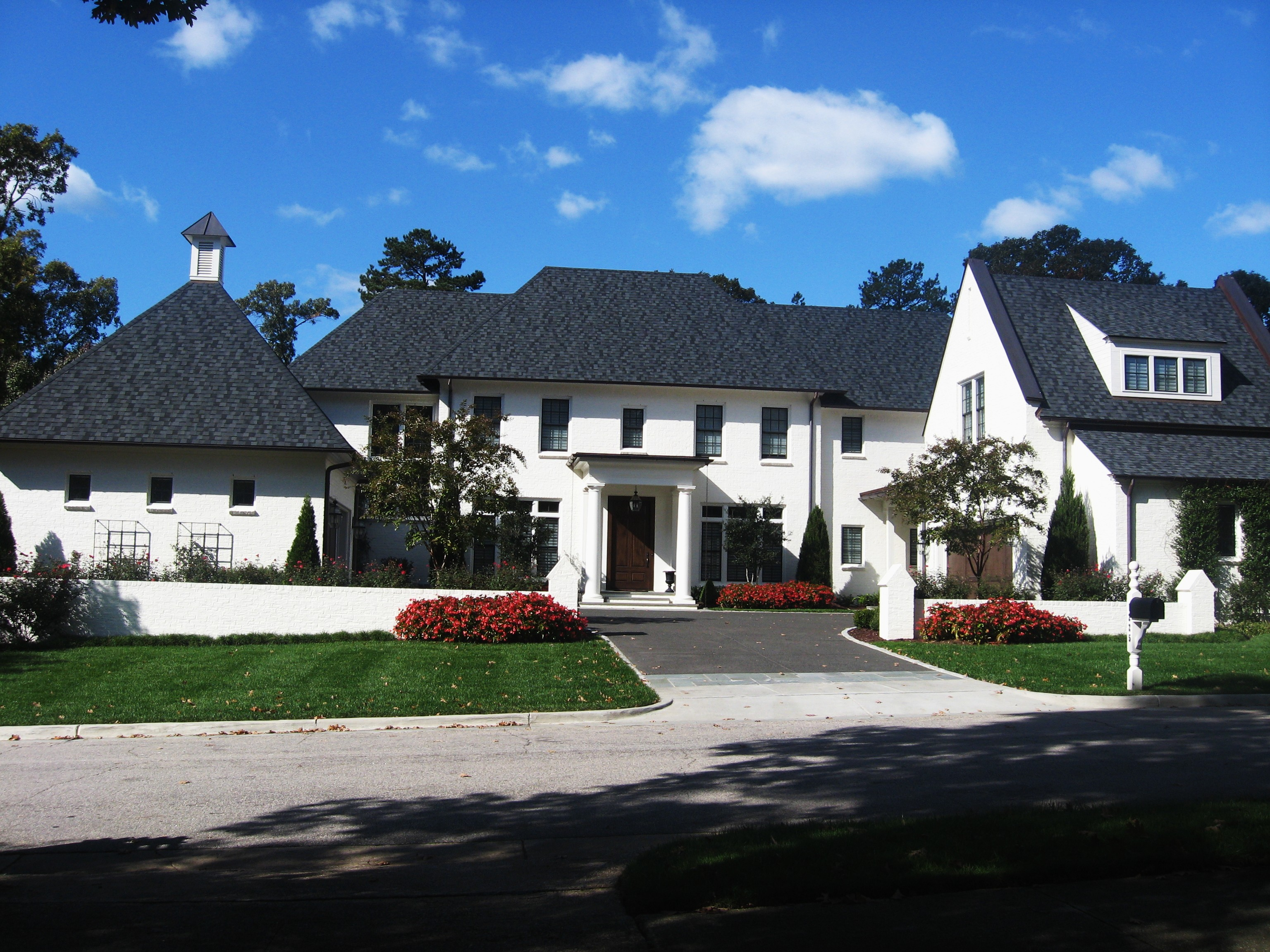
Former home of Bill Cowher.

== Neighborhood ==
The houses in North Ridge Estates are located along the golf courses, woods, and lakes. Many homes are priced in the millions of dollars.

== Controversies ==
In July 2001 the U.S. Department of Agriculture granted the country club permission to euthanize 150 Canada geese that lived on the golf courses. The decision was protested by animal rights activists.

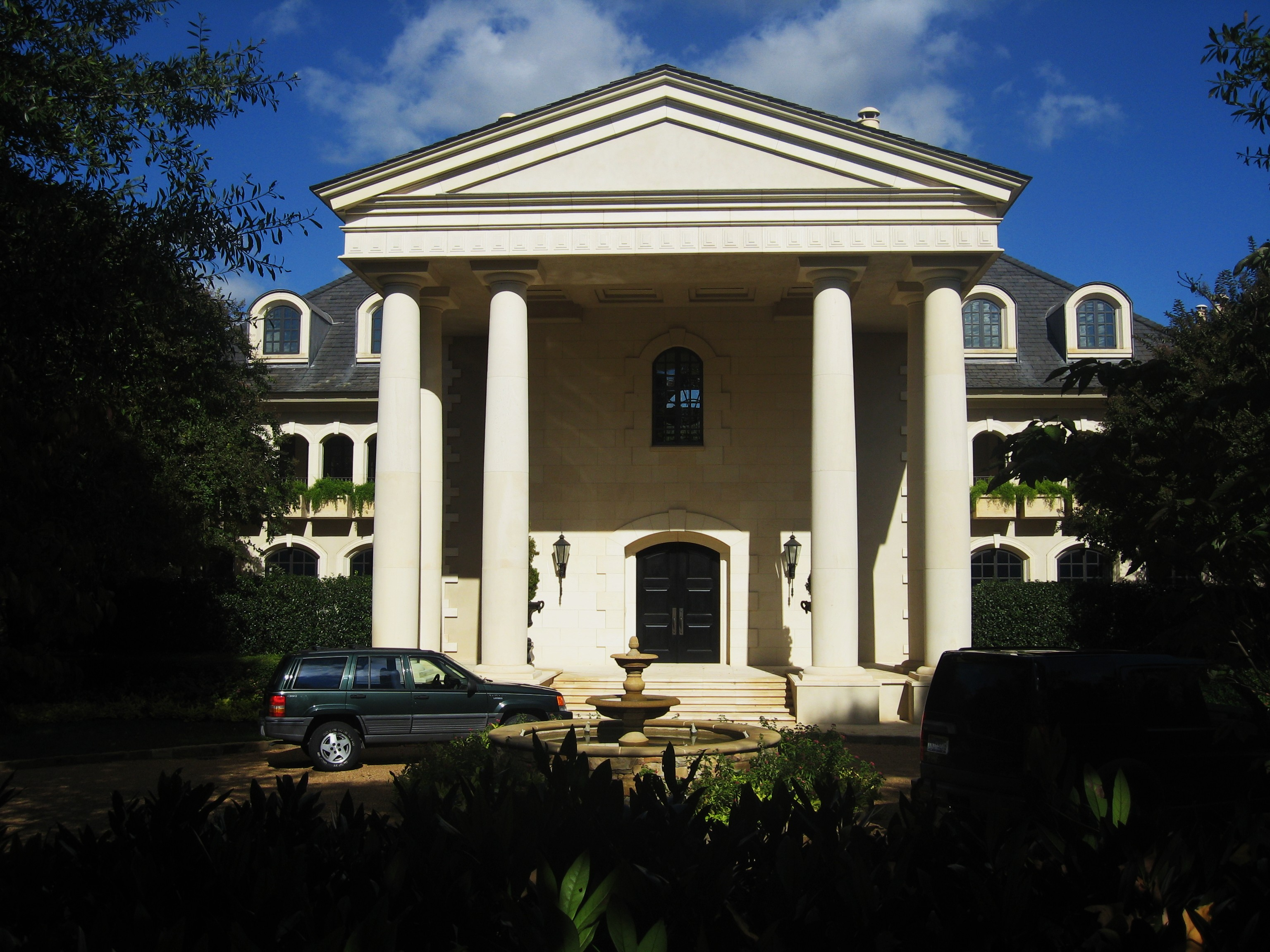
The Teyf's home, Painter House, which was raided by FBI agents in December 2018.

In April 2009 a Raleigh police officer employed by the country club as security was part of an investigation into how Raleigh Police Department employees are paid for off-duty jobs.

In 2013 North Ridge Country Club was named in an investigation regarding private North Carolinian country clubs that claimed non-profit status. That year the club took in $9 million in total revenue.

In December 2018 Leonid and Tatyana Teyf's $5 million mansion in North Ridge was raided by FBI agents. Agents seized over $1 million worth of property from the residence, including diamonds and cars. The Teyfs, who immigrated to the United States from Russia in 2010, had been charged with money laundering and defrauding the Russian government out of $150 million. Leonid Teyf was additionally charged with planning a murder-for-hire and bribing a federal agent to have his wife's lover, who was the son of their live-in housekeeper, deported back to Russia and killed. The Teyf's home was pulled from an auction with Platinum Luxury Auctions in August 2024.

== Notable residences ==
- Painter House

== Notable residents and members ==
Notable past and present residents and/or members of North Ridge include:

- Mandy Cohen, physician and Director of the U.S. Centers for Disease Control and Prevention
- Bill Cowher, NFL player and coach
- Mark A. Davis, justice of the North Carolina Supreme Court
- Elliot Engel, author and scholar
- Chesson Hadley, professional golfer
- John Replogle, former CEO of Burt's Bees
- Leonid Teyf, businessman and white-collar criminal

== Gallery ==
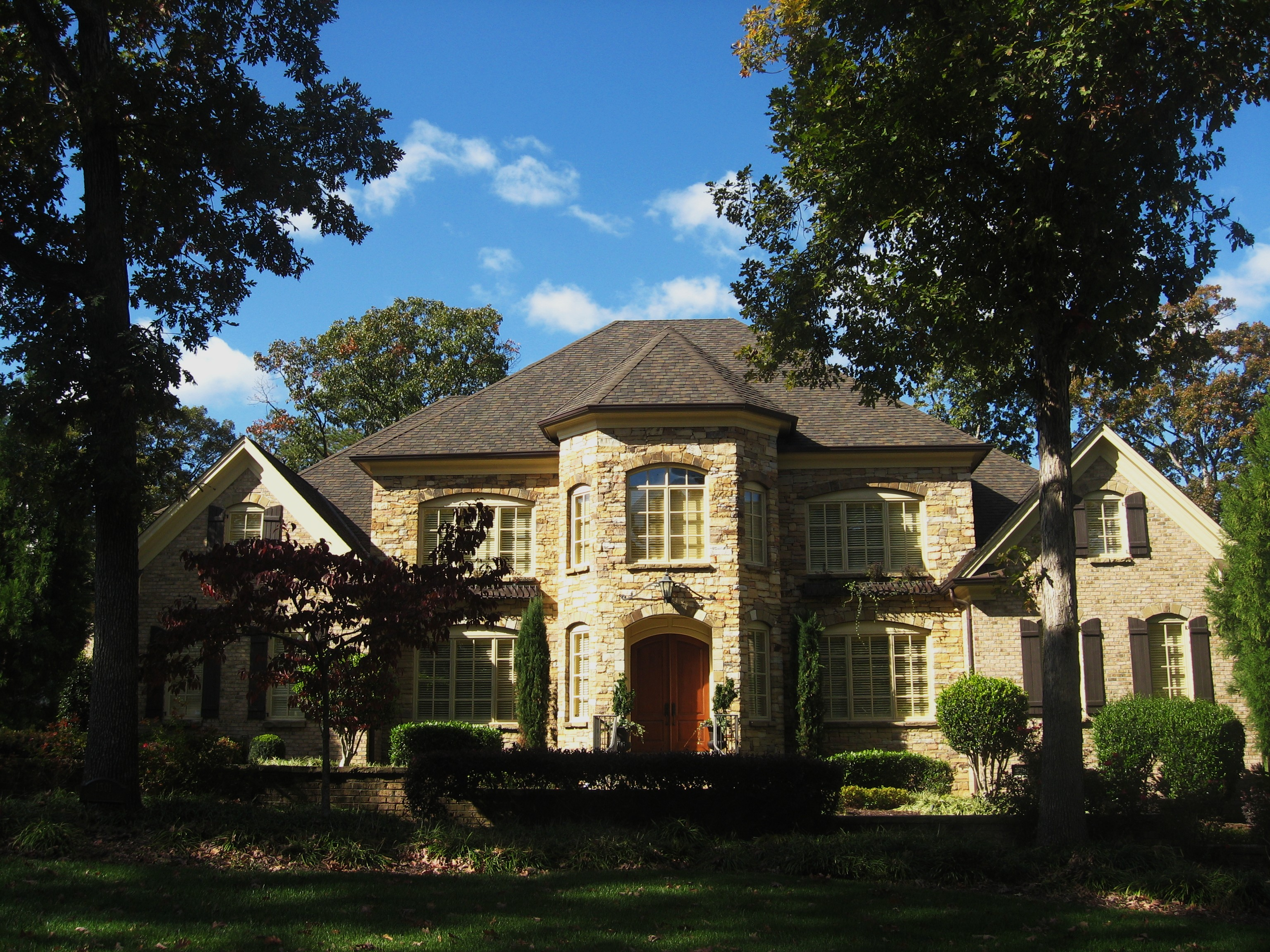

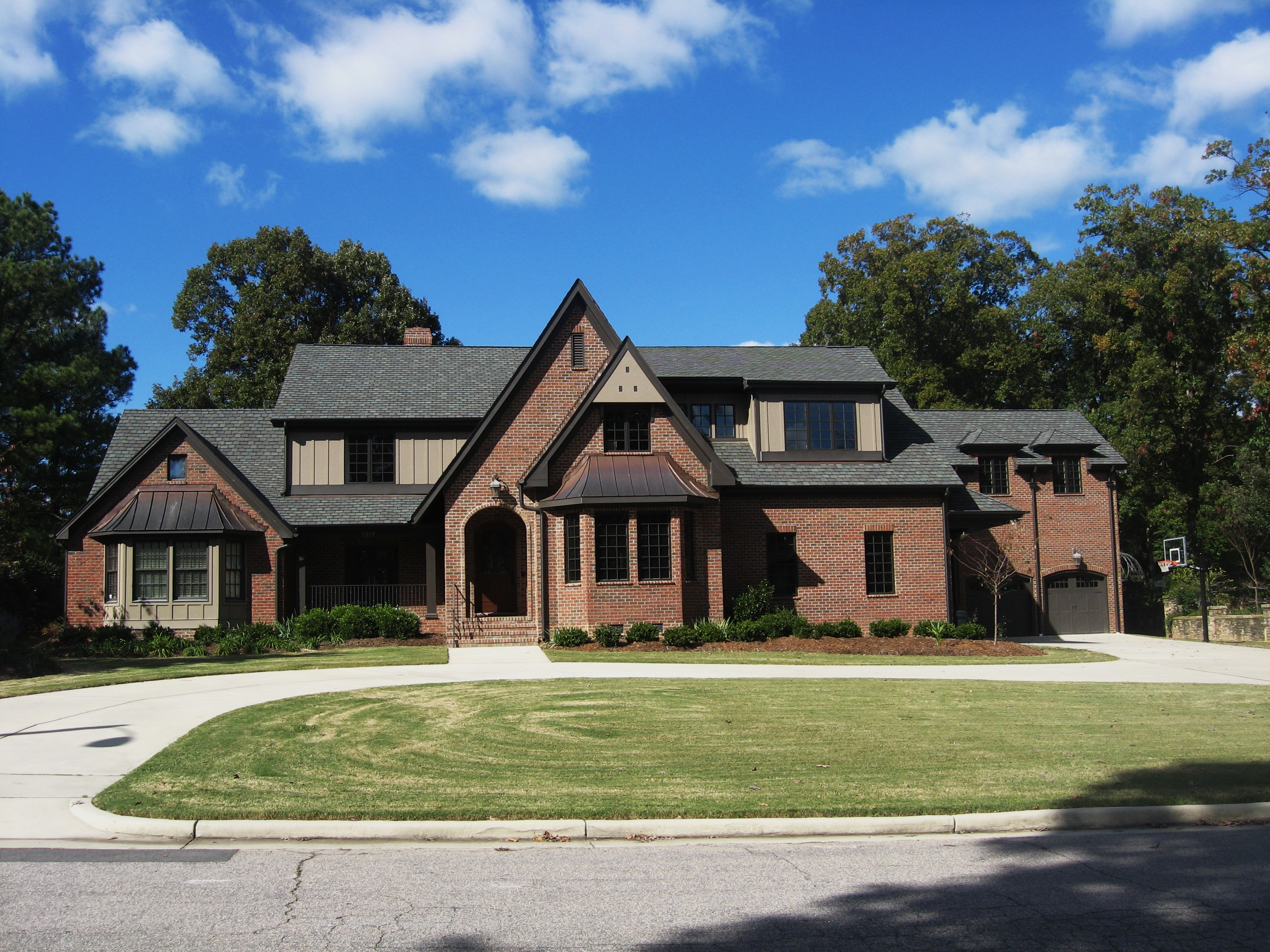

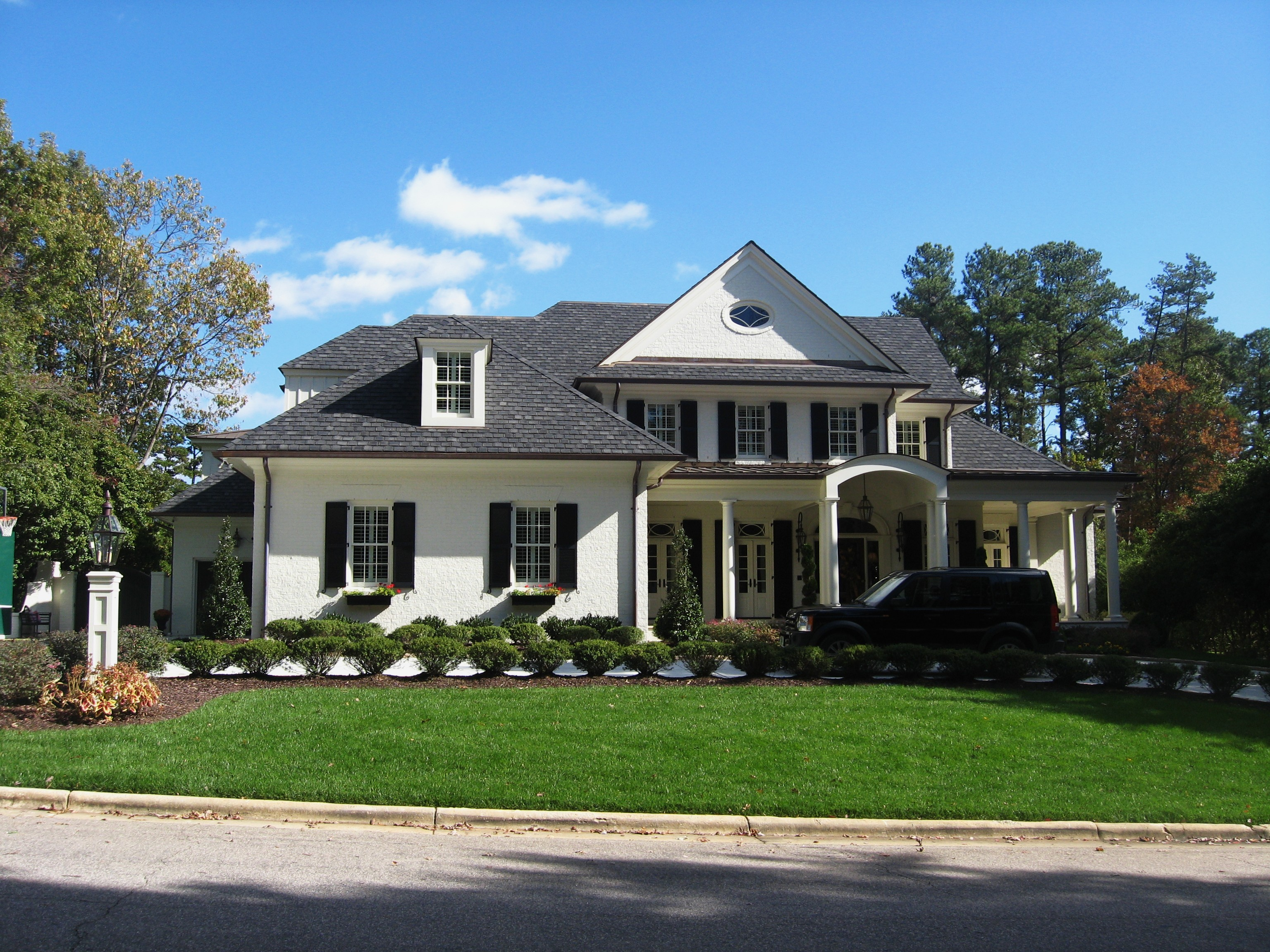

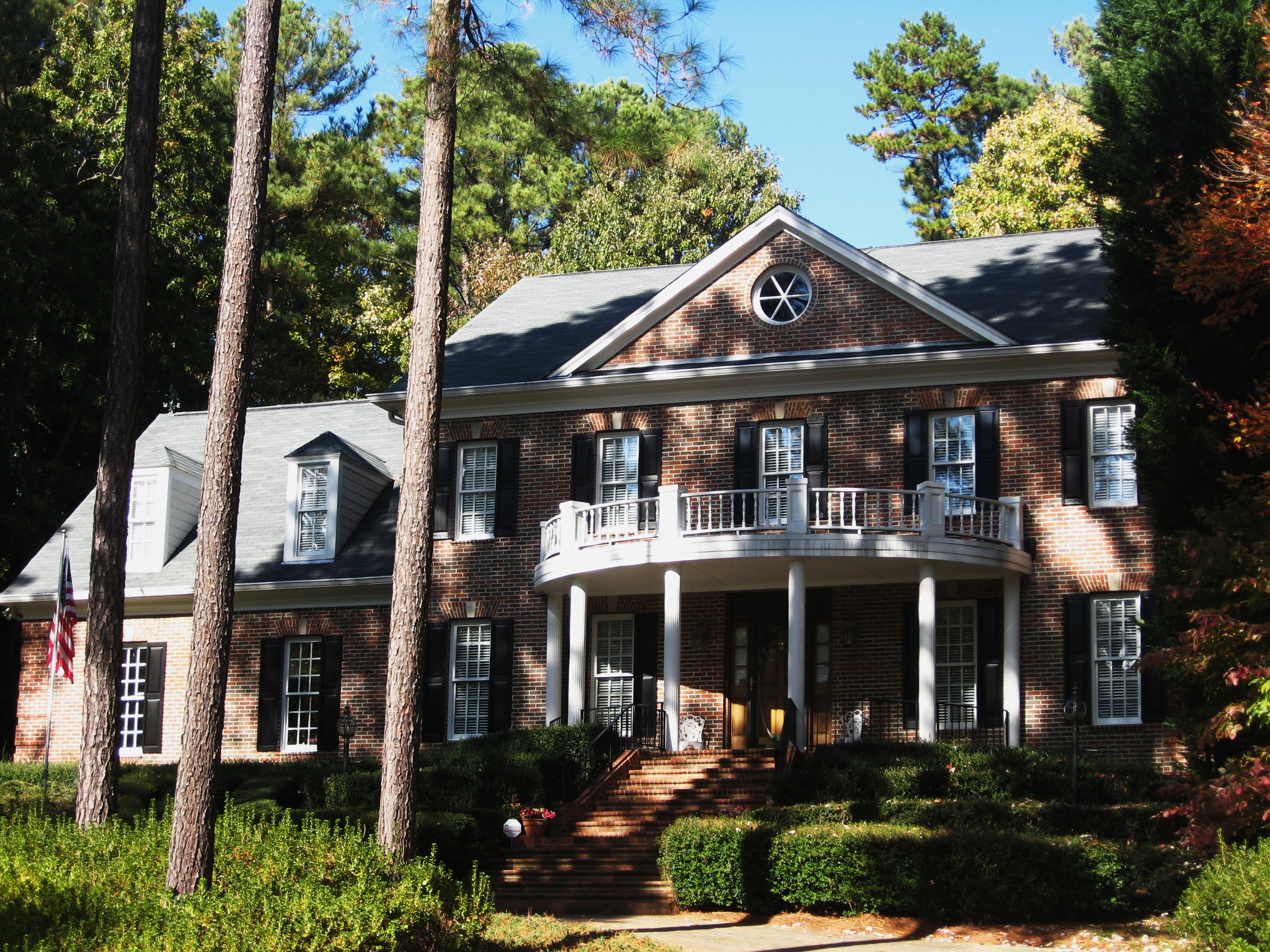

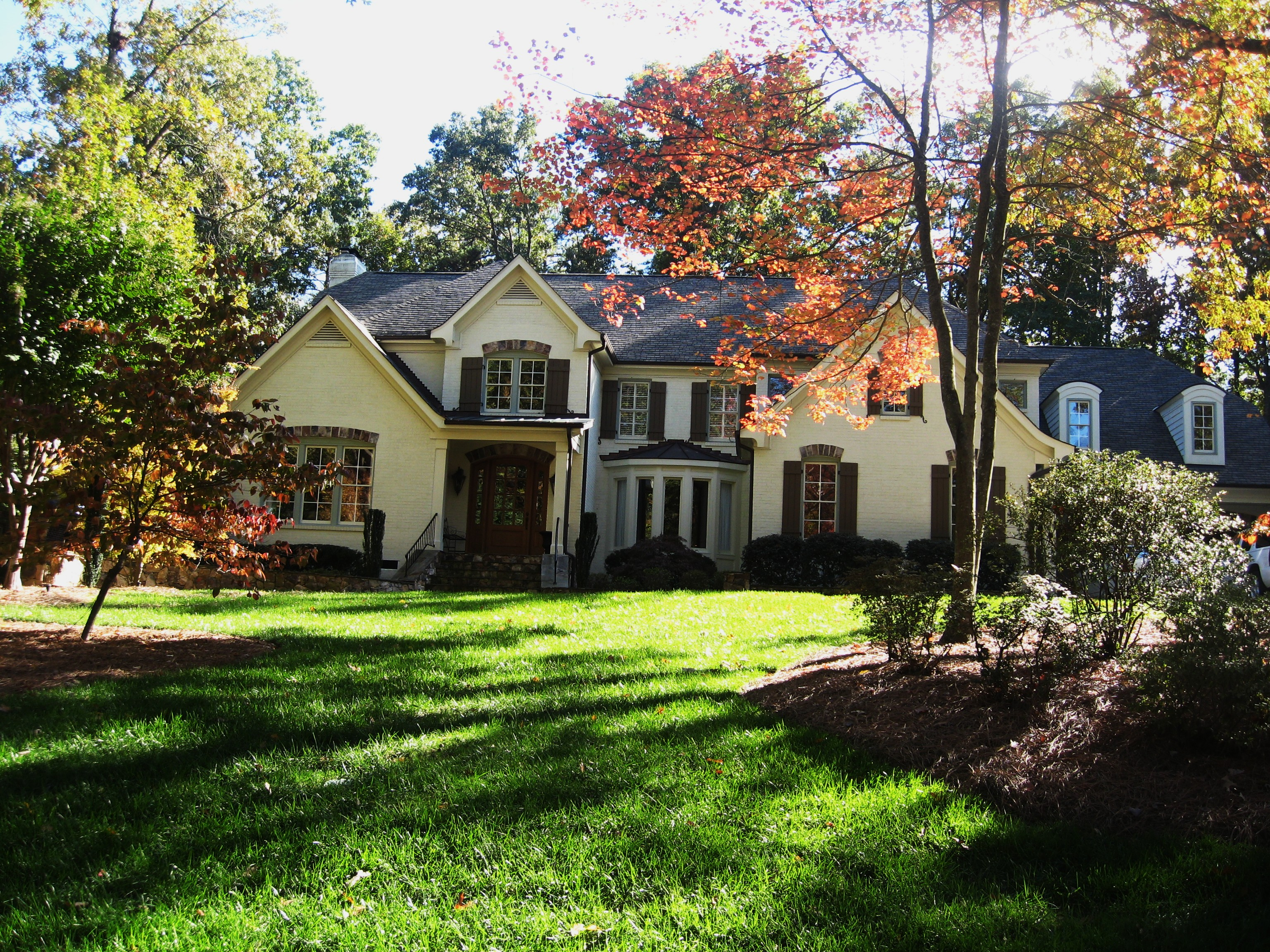
