= The Tides Inn =

- Interactive map of the The Tides Inn area

General information
- Location: Irvington, Virginia, USA, 22480
- Coordinates: 37°39′51″N 76°25′57″W
- Opening: 1947
- Owner: Tanzerra Resorts

Other information
- Number of rooms: 70

Website
- tidesinn.com

The Tides Inn is a waterfront resort just off the Rappahannock River in Irvington, Virginia, United States, and located within the Irvington National Register District. Opened in 1947 by entrepreneur E.A. Stephens, it is now owned and operated by Enchantment Group. The East Coast resort on Virginia's Northern Neck, was known for its regional cooking and amenities such as golf and boating; the Tides Inn slogan "Quiet Quality" appeared in advertisements in The New Yorker.

== History ==
E.A Stephens and his wife would purchase a 25-acre farm in 1945 for $5,000. The high land, water views, and clearing of the fields near the farm would influence their idea of opening up a hotel in the area.

In the fall of 1946, the two decided to create and eventually open an Inn, stating that it would be "the finest thing that could be developed and still keep the rural atmosphere.” The inn would open on July 15, 1947.

In 1956, Stephens purchased and restored the decommissioned USS Aquamarine to be the star attraction at the resort, renaming it Miss Ann after his wife.

Andrew Hepburn, in his 1965 book Great Resorts of North America, says that the resort was built on a site called the old Ashburn Farm. Stephens used local timber, including walnut paneling from trees on the farm and cypress paneling from a nearby swamp, hauled to Irvington by oxcart. In the beginning, there were only 47 rooms. From the start, Stephens sought the best antiques for furnishing. Hepburn writes that one of the best early recipes at the resort was the breakfast dish Hangtown fry, made of local oysters and scrambled eggs. The resort had a number of yearly traditions including a Frostbite Regatta and Fourth of July fireworks. The poolside restaurant was known as the Bubble Club. The resort had an eagle theme; not only was an eagle on the Tides Inn logo but the hotel's 1976 golf course, designed by George Cobb and John LaFoy, was named the Golden Eagle. The golf course is surrounded by a 50 acre lake and is considered the only operational golf course in Lancaster County.

In the early days, due to local liquor laws the restaurant and hotel were not able to sell alcohol to guests. However, because private clubs were not bound by the same constraints Stephens formed the Chesapeake Club, a name still used by the hotel. Yachtsmen and local patrons were invited to join and paid a nominal yearly due. Transient guests could join during their stay for $1 extra per day.

After acquisition by Tanzerra Resorts (previously known as Enchantment Group) in 2001, the property underwent an $18 million renovation, reopening in 2002. In 2008, Miss Ann was sold. The resort has a total of 70 guest rooms (including suites), a full-service spa, along with a 60-slip marina and a par-72 championship golf course, the Golden Eagle.
