= George Cobb (golf) =

Golf course architect (1914–1986)

- Born: July 2, 1914; Savannah, Georgia, U.S.
- Died: January 15, 1986 (aged 71); Greenville, South Carolina, U.S.
- Education: University of Georgia
- Occupation: Golf course designer
- Notable work: Tournament Players Clubs; Mark Bostick Golf Course; Slammer and Squire at World Golf Village
- Children: 2
- Awards: 2014 South Carolina Golf Hall of Fame; 2019 Carolinas Golf Association Hall of Fame

George William Cobb, ASGCA (July 2, 1914 – January 15, 1986) was a notable and prolific golf course designer who created the Par-3 course at Augusta National Golf Club among more than one hundred courses and renovated many, including his own early work. He strove to create attractive layouts that the average golfer would find enjoyable, not frustrating.

== Biography ==
=== Early life ===
Cobb was born into a family of golfers in Savannah, Georgia, learned to play as a child and was a scratch golfer. He had an older brother, W.E. and a younger sister, Mary A. Cobb attended the University of Georgia, where he played on the college golf team. He studied landscape architecture and graduated in 1937. He was hired by the National Park Service and worked as a landscape architect until 1941.

=== Military ===
During World War II, Cobb was a Marine Corps engineering officer at Camp Lejeune in North Carolina. Because he was an avid golfer and landscape architect, he was assigned the task of constructing a golf course for use in physical rehabilitation of injured GIs, but he had no experience in course design. Cobb was permitted to hire experienced course architect Fred Findlay to provide design assistance. Cobb handled the construction superintendent responsibilities on this and a subsequent course at Lejeune. In 1946, Cobb designed and built the course at the Marine Corps Air Station Cherry Point on his own, then was discharged from the Marines during 1947.

=== Vocation ===
After the experience provided by the military, Cobb decided that he enjoyed building golf courses. He started his own golf design business and created six courses, but when the Korean War escalated, he was recalled to active duty in 1951. Released from service, Cobb initially moved to Chapel Hill, North Carolina and was working on the Country Club of Sapphire Valley when he was hired to build the Green Valley Country Club. While working on Green Valley in the spring of 1956, he was offered and accepted a position as a director of Hollyridge Corporation, the developer. He and his family settled in Greenville, South Carolina, where they remained. In 1958 he was named general manager of the club, but resigned when his design business proliferated during 1960, when he had eight South Carolina courses under construction or being designed.

=== Augusta ===
Cobb's shortest course may actually be his most prominent creation. Cobb was design consultant at Augusta National Golf Club from the mid-1950s and became good friends with Bobby Jones and Clifford Roberts, chairman of Augusta National. The club decided to add a par 3, nine-hole course in 1958, which Alister MacKenzie had suggested in the 1930s. Cobb was asked to design it with input from Roberts, and the 1,060 yard "little course" opened in 1959. The Par-3 Contest has been held on Wednesday of Masters week since 1960. In fifty years of Masters play, no one has ever won the Par-3 and the main tournament in the same week. Cobb added a fresh touch to the "big course" in 1967 and 1977. The only other Par 3 course Cobb ever designed was at Vestavia Country Club in Birmingham, Alabama.

== Associate ==
John LaFoy grew up in Greenville, and was close friends with Cobb's son, George, Jr. LaFoy studied architecture and graduated from Clemson University in 1968. He apprenticed with George Cobb before the Vietnam War forced him into the service. Like Cobb, LaFoy chose the Marine Corps. After his discharge, LaFoy returned to work with Cobb, and in 1971, he became Cobb's partner. They collaborated on every subsequent course the firm built, and when Cobb's health began to fail in the early 1980s, he ran the company. After Cobb's death in 1986, LaFoy continued designing and remodeling courses, and in 1999, he served as president of the American Society of Golf Course Architects.

== Personal ==
While he was stationed at Camp LeJeune, Cobb married and had a son, George, Jr. and a daughter, Virginia.

== Courses designed ==
The following table is a (partial) list of courses that George Cobb either designed alone (prior to 1971) or co-designed with John LaFoy.

Click arrow box in column heading to sort by that attribute.

Facility Name	Access	City	State	Built
East Lake Golf Club	Private	Atlanta	GA	1963
Coosa Country Club	Private	Rome	GA	1961
Cane Creek Golf Course	Public	Fort McClellan	AL	1942
Gold at Paradise Point Golf Course	Military	Camp Lejeune	NC	1945
Paradise Point Golf Club (Gold course)	Military	Camp Lejeune	NC	1945
Cherry Point Golf Club	Private	Cherry Point	NC	1946
Green Valley Country Club	Private	Greenville	SC	1955
Fort Mill Golf Club	Semi-Private	Fort Mill	SC	1948
Fort Jackson Golf Course	Military	Columbia	SC	1949
Wildcat at Fort Jackson Golf Club	Military	Fort Jackson	SC	1949
Carmel Country Club (North course)	Private	Charlotte	NC	1950
Lake/Cedar at Greenwood Country Club	Private	Greenwood	SC	1950
University of North Carolina Finley Golf Course	Semi-Private	Chapel Hill	NC	1951
Jacksonville Country Club	Private	Jacksonville	NC	1951
High Hampton Inn & Country Club	Resort	Cashiers	NC	1956
University of Maryland Golf Course	Semi-Private	College Park	MD	1956
Fort Eustis Golf Club	Military	Fort Eustis	VA	1956
Parks at Courses at Fort Meade	Military	Fort Meade	MD	1956
Glenn Dale Country Club	Semi-Private	Glenn Dale	MD	1956
Laurel Pines Country Club	Public	Laurel	MD	1956
Laurel Country Club	Public	Laurel	MD	1957
JC Long Estate Golf Club	Semi-Private	Mount Pleasant	SC	1957
Vestavia Country Club	Private	Birmingham	AL	1958
Willowhaven Country Club	Semi-Private	Durham	NC	1958
Raleigh Golf Association (9)	Public	Raleigh	NC	1958
Country Club of Sapphire Valley	Private	Cashiers	NC	1956
Lakeside Golf Club	Public	Atlanta	GA	1960
The Nine Hole at Augusta National Golf Club	Private	Augusta	GA	1960
Green Island Country Club	Private	Columbus	GA	1960
Surf Golf & Beach Club	Private	North Myrtle Beach	SC	1960
Vestavia Country Club-Par 3 Course	Private	Birmingham	AL	1960
Quail Hollow Club	Private	Charlotte	NC	1961
Spring Valley Country Club	Private	Columbia	SC	1961
Sea Pines Resort (Sea Marsh course, renamed Heron Point)	Resort	Hilton Head Island	SC	1961
Deerwood Club	Private	Jacksonville	FL	1961
Berkeley Country Club	Semi-Private	Moncks Corner	SC	1961
Mountain Valley Golf Course	Semi-Private	Waynesville	NC	1961
Oak Island Golf Club	Semi-Private	Caswell Beach	NC	1962
Wildcat Cliffs Country Club	Private	Highlands	NC	1962
Windsor Forest Country Club	Private	Savannah	GA	1962
Hound Ears Club	Resort	Boone	NC	1963
Dublin Country Club	Private	Dublin	GA	1963
Gainesville Golf & Country Club	Private	Gainesville	FL	1963
Botany Woods Golf Club	Private	Greenville	SC	1963
Timuquana Country Club	Private	Jacksonville	FL	1963
Milledgeville Country Club	Public	Milledgeville	GA	1963
Mountain Glen Golf Course	Semi-Private	Newland	NC	1963
Waynesboro Country Club	Private	Waynesboro	GA	1963
Doublegate Country Club	Private	Albany	GA	1964
Ocean Point at Fripp Island Resort	Resort	Fripp Island	SC	1964
Barony at Port Royal Golf Club	Private	Hilton Head Island	SC	1964
Eighteen Hole at Indian Lake Estates Golf & Country Club	Semi-Private	Indian Lake Estates	FL	1964
Rolling Hills Country Club	Private	Monroe	NC	1964
High Meadows Golf & Country Club	Private	Roaring Gap	NC	1964
Croasdaile Country Club	Private	Durham	NC	1965
Adventure Inn Golf Club	Resort	Hilton Head Island	SC	1965
Robber's Row at Port Royal Golf Club	Private	Hilton Head Island	SC	1967
Sharon Golf Club	Private	Sharon Center	OH	1965
Wrenwoods Golf Club at Charleston Air Force Base	Military	Charleston	SC	1966
Clarksville Country Club	Private	Clarksville	TN	1966
Cabarrus Country Club	Private	Concord	NC	1966
Burningtree Country Club	Private	Decatur	AL	1966
Myrtlewood Golf Club (Pines Course)	Private	Myrtle Beach	SC	1966
Forest Heights Country Club	Private	Statesboro	GA	1966
Sea Pines Resort (Ocean course)	Resort	Hilton Head Island	SC	1967
North Ridge Country Club (Lakes course)	Private	Raleigh	NC	1967
Sea Palms Golf & Tennis Resort (Tall Pines course)	Resort	Saint Simons Island	GA	1967
Sea Palms Golf & Tennis Resort (Great Oaks course)	Resort	Saint Simons Island	GA	1967
Hunter Golf Club	Military	Savannah	GA	1967
Mary Calder Golf Club	Public	Savannah	GA	1967
Twin Falls Resort State Park	Resort	Mullens	WV	1968
Santee Cooper Country Club	Semi-Private	Santee	SC	1968
Pine Tree Country Club	Private	Birmingham	AL	1969
Country Club of Charleston	Private	Charleston	WV	1969
Star Fort National Golf Course	Private	Ninety Six	SC	1969
Edgewood Country Club	Private	Sissonville	WV	1969
Browns Mill Golf Course	Municipal	Atlanta	GA	1970
Pope AFB Golf Course	Military	Fayetteville	NC	1970
Clipper/Galleon at Shipyard Golf Club	Resort	Hilton Head Island	SC	1970
Brigantine/Clipper at Shipyard Golf Club	Resort	Hilton Head Island	SC	1970
Galleon/Brigantine at Shipyard Golf Club	Resort	Hilton Head Island	SC	1970
Spanish Wells Club	Private	Hilton Head Island	SC	1970
Warrior's Path State Park Golf Course	Public	Kingsport	TN	1970
Snee Farm Country Club	Private	Mount Pleasant	SC	1970
Fort McClellan Golf Club	Military	Fort McClellan	AL	1971
Goose Pond Colony Golf Course	Public	Scottsboro	AL	1971
Red Wing Lake Golf Course	Public	Virginia Beach	VA	1971
Brookfield West Golf & Country Club	Private	Atlanta	GA	1972
Connestee Falls Golf Course	Semi-Private	Brevard	NC	1972
The Resort at Glade Springs	Resort	Daniels	WV	1972
Stonebridge Golf Course	Public	Lakeland	TN	1972
Cleghorn Plantation Golf & Country Club	Public	Rutherfordton	NC	1972
Eisenhower College Golf Course (9)	Private	Seneca	NY	1972
Bald Head Island Country Club	Semi-Private	Southport	NC	1972
Glade Springs Country Club	Private	Beckley	WV	1973
Inverness Country Club	Private	Birmingham	AL	1973
StillWaters Golf Club - The Legend Course	Private	Dadeville	AL	1973
Holly Tree Country Club	Private	Greenville	SC	1973
Bryan Park Players Course	Public	Browns Summit	NC	1974
Frank G. Clemment Golf Club	Semi-Private	Dickson	TN	1974
Nine Hole Par 3 at Indian Lake Estates Golf & Country Club	Semi-Private	Indian Lake Estates	FL	1974
Stonebridge Golf Course	Public	Memphis	TN	1974
Cobb's Glen Country Club	Semi-Private	Anderson	SC	1975
Woodlands Golf & Country Club	Private	Columbia	SC	1975
Clemson University Golf Course	Semi-Private	Clemson	SC	1976
The Tides Inn (Golden Eagle course)	Resort	Irvington	VA	1976
Mountwood Park Golf Course	Semi-Private	Waverly	WV	1977
Keowee Key Golf & Country Club	Private	Seneca	SC	1977
New Quarter Park Golf Club	Semi-Private	Williamsburg	VA	1977
Pohick Bay Golf Course	Public	Lorton	VA	1978
Mallard Head Country Club	Semi-Private	Mooresville	NC	1979
Heddle's Hideaway Country Club	Semi-Private	Spartanburg	SC	1979
Linville Ridge Country Club	Private	Linville	NC	1983
North/East at Athens Country Club	Private	Athens	GA	1985
Sanctuary Golf Club	Private	Beaufort	SC	1985
Cat Island Country Club	Private	Beaufort	SC	1985
Tartan Golf Club	Resort	Weems	VA	1958
