= Mitchellville, Maryland =

Census-designated place in Maryland

- Census-designated place
- Location of Mitchellville, Maryland
- Coordinates: 38°56′29″N 76°48′49″W
- Country: United States
- State: Maryland
- County: Prince George's

Area
  - Total: 4.96 sq mi (12.84 km^{2})
  - Land: 4.94 sq mi (12.79 km^{2})
  - Water: 0.019 sq mi (0.05 km^{2})
- Elevation: 105 ft (32 m)

Population (2020)
  - Total: 11,136
  - Density: 2,255.6/sq mi (870.88/km^{2})
- Time zone: UTC−5 (Eastern (EST))
  - Summer (DST): UTC−4 (EDT)
- ZIP codes: 20716, 20717, 20721, 20720
- Area codes: 301, 240
- FIPS code: 24-52975
- GNIS feature ID: 0597758

Mitchellville is a majority African-American unincorporated area and census-designated place (CDP) in Prince George's County, Maryland, United States. Per the 2020 census, the population was 11,136.

== History ==
Mitchellville was named for John Mitchell (1788–1862), who owned Essington Hall, the plantation that encompassed much of the area. He and his wife Mary Lanham are buried in the Mitchell Family Cemetery on Mitchellville and Mount Oak Road. This location is now South Bowie, and the Bowie CDP 08775 An 1878 G.M. Hopkins Atlas shows "Mitchellville P.O." near the same corner of what is today Mitchellville and Mount Oak Road. In its original cataloging the name and place "Mitchellville", the USGS used the railroad guide "Mitchellville (Mulliki'n) G. S. Owensville sheet Mitchellville P. G. 614 Mulliken R.'R. Guide, 314." as a basis in its decision card documentation where a Mullikin/Mitchellville railroad stop served also as the post office. This is also seen in other historic maps

The area was historically occupied by various farming families, who mainly raised tobacco and cattle on homesteads in the area. During the late 70s, the county's desire to increase the desirability of Prince Georges' as a homestead for various professionals led to the rezoning of many tracts of land in the area. Between 1979 and 1995, much of the farmland in the area was redeveloped for residential and commercial use.

As of 2010, the Census designated place ("CDP") Mitchellville is no longer encompassing of the original Mitchellville, location of the old Essington Hall, but is drawn one CDP tract over on the west of the Woodmore CDP.

Also, see "Woodmore" for common historical information

== Geography ==
According to the United States Census Bureau, the CDP has a total area of 5.0 square miles (13 km^{2}), all land.

== Demographics ==
Historical population
Census	Pop.	Note	%±
1990	12,593		—
2000	9,611		−23.7%
2010	10,967		14.1%
2020	11,136		1.5%
U.S. Decennial Census; 2010 2020

=== Racial and ethnic composition ===
Mitchellville CDP, Maryland – Racial and ethnic composition Note: the US Census treats Hispanic/Latino as an ethnic category. This table excludes Latinos from the racial categories and assigns them to a separate category. Hispanics/Latinos may be of any race.
Race / Ethnicity (NH = Non-Hispanic)	Pop 2000	Pop 2010	Pop 2020	% 2000	% 2010	% 2020
White alone (NH)	1,222	635	498	12.71%	5.79%	4.47%
Black or African American alone (NH)	7,501	9,280	9,218	78.05%	84.62%	82.78%
Native American or Alaska Native alone (NH)	24	21	19	0.25%	0.19%	0.17%
Asian alone (NH)	377	350	341	3.92%	3.19%	3.06%
Native Hawaiian or Pacific Islander alone (NH)	6	4	0	0.06%	0.04%	0.00%
Other race alone (NH)	15	13	42	0.16%	0.12%	0.38%
Mixed race or Multiracial (NH)	265	258	388	2.76%	2.35%	3.48%
Hispanic or Latino (any race)	201	406	630	2.09%	3.70%	5.66%
Total	9,611	10,967	11,136	100.00%	100.00%	100.00%

=== 2020 census ===
As of the 2020 census, Mitchellville had a population of 11,136. The median age was 44.6 years. 19.4% of residents were under the age of 18 and 20.6% of residents were 65 years of age or older. For every 100 females there were 85.2 males, and for every 100 females age 18 and over there were 80.3 males age 18 and over.

100.0% of residents lived in urban areas, while 0.0% lived in rural areas.

There were 3,785 households in Mitchellville, of which 32.7% had children under the age of 18 living in them. Of all households, 50.7% were married-couple households, 12.3% were households with a male householder and no spouse or partner present, and 33.8% were households with a female householder and no spouse or partner present. About 20.2% of all households were made up of individuals and 8.2% had someone living alone who was 65 years of age or older.

There were 3,871 housing units, of which 2.2% were vacant. The homeowner vacancy rate was 0.4% and the rental vacancy rate was 8.8%.

=== 2000 census ===
As of the United States Census of 2000, there were 9,611 people, 3,148 households, and 2,556 families residing in the CDP. The population density was 1,930.4 inhabitants per square mile (745.3/km^{2}). There were 3,243 housing units at an average density of 651.4 per square mile (251.5/km^{2}). The racial makeup of the CDP was 13.29% White, 78.50% Black, 0.26% Native American, 3.93% Asian, 0.06% Pacific Islander, 0.80% from other races, and 3.15% from two or more races. 2.09% of the population were Hispanic or Latino of any race.

There were 3,148 households, out of which 41.1% had children under the age of 18 living with them, 61.8% were married couples living together, 15.3% had a female householder with no husband present, and 18.8% were non-families. 15.2% of all households were made up of individuals, and 1.8% had someone living alone who was 65 years of age or older. The average household size was 3.02 and the average family size was 3.34.

In the CDP, the population was spread out, with 27.5% under the age of 18, 7.7% from 18 to 24, 28.5% from 25 to 44, 30.1% from 45 to 64, and 6.3% who were 65 years of age or older. The median age was 38 years. For every 100 females, there were 86.9 males. For every 100 females age 18 and over, there were 82.8 males.

The median income for a household in the CDP was $84,687, and the median income for a family was $118,022, ranking # 4 among the richest black communities in US as end of 2020. Males had a median income of $58,576 versus $66,875 for females. The per capita income for the CDP was $30,801. About 1.9% of families and 2.8% of the population were below the poverty line, including 3.7% of those under age 18 and 7.3% of those age 65 or over.

== Education ==
Prince George's County Public Schools serve Mitchellville.

Kingsford, Ardmore, Woodmore, and Lake Arbor elementary schools serve sections of Mitchellville CDP. Most of Mitchellville CDP is served by Ernest Everett Just Middle School, while a portion is zoned to Thomas Johnson Middle School. Most of Mitchellville CDP is served by Charles Herbert Flowers High School, while a portion is zoned to DuVal High School.

== Infrastructure ==
Prince George's County Police Department District 2 Station in Brock Hall CDP.
