= Economy of North Carolina =

In 2023, the total gross domestic product of the U.S. state of North Carolina was around $559.1 billion.

According to the Bureau of Economic Analysis, the state's 2010 total gross state product was $424.9 billion, making it the ninth-wealthiest state in terms of gross domestic product. Its 2007 per capita personal income was $33,735, placing 36th in the nation.

There has been a distinct difference in the economic growth of North Carolina's urban areas compared to its rural areas. While large cities such as Charlotte, Raleigh, Greensboro, and others have experienced rapid population and economic growth over the last thirty years, many of the state's small towns have suffered from loss of jobs and population. Most of North Carolina's small towns historically developed around textile and furniture factories. However, North Carolina has been affected by offshoring and industrial growth in countries like China; one in five manufacturing jobs in the state has been lost to overseas competition. As these factories closed and moved to low-wage markets in Asia and Latin America, the small towns that depended upon them have suffered.

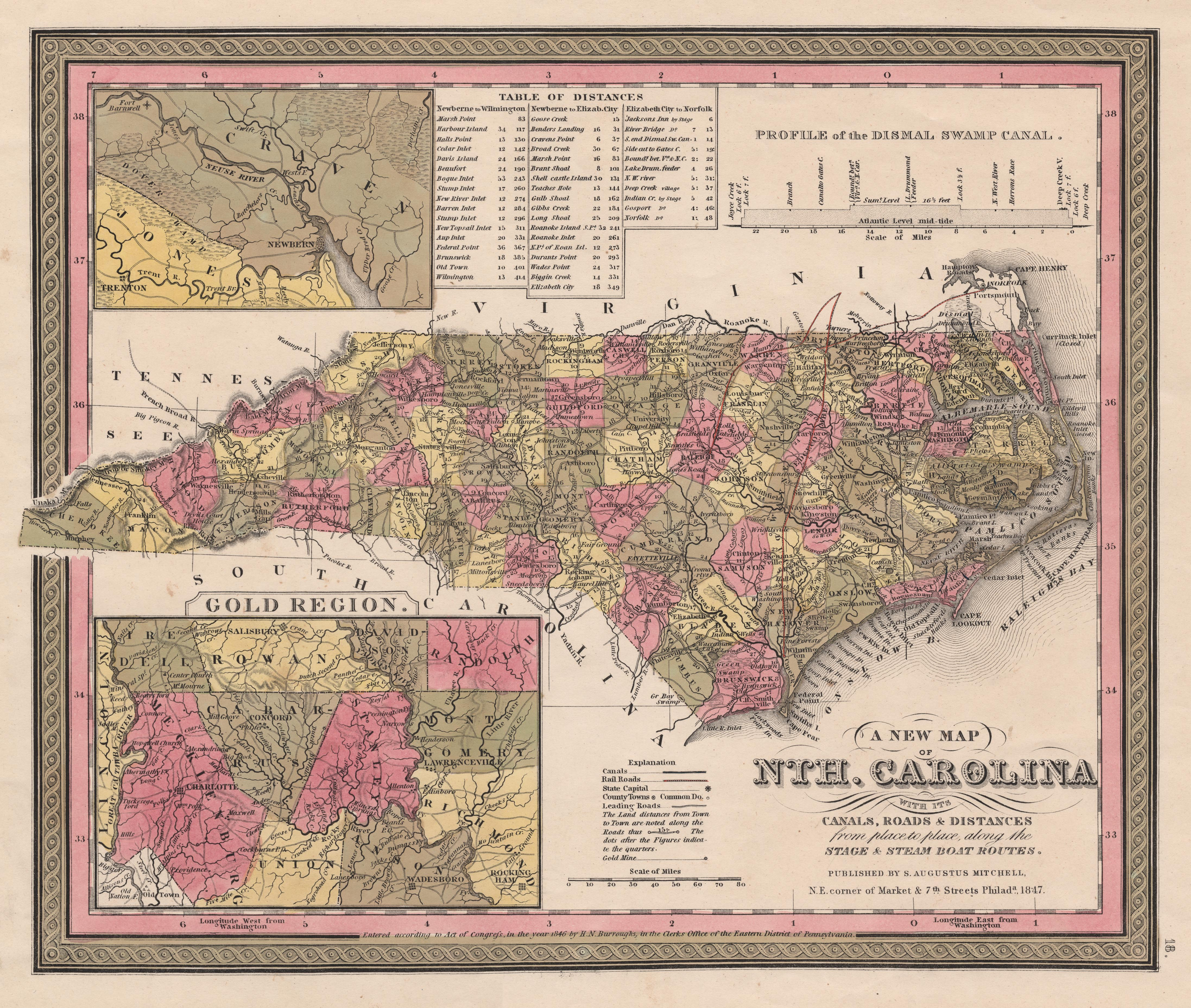
Map of North Carolina showing "The Gold Region." 1847

The first gold nugget found in the U.S. was found in Cabarrus County in 1799. The first gold dollar minted in the U.S. was minted at the Bechtler Mint in Rutherford County.

== Agriculture and manufacturing ==
The responsibilities in regulatory and service areas covering different aspect of agriculture and manufacturing are overseen by the North Carolina Department of Agriculture and Consumer Services. Over the past century, North Carolina has grown to become a national leader in agriculture, financial services, and manufacturing. The state's industrial output—mainly textiles, chemicals, electrical equipment, paper and pulp and paper products—ranked eighth in the nation in the early 1990s. The textile industry, which was once a mainstay of the state's economy, has been steadily losing jobs to producers in Latin America and Asia for the past 25 years, though the state remains the largest textile employer in the United States. In recent years, another important Carolina industry, furniture production, has also been hard hit by jobs moving to Asia (especially China).

North Carolina's agricultural outputs include poultry and eggs, tobacco, hogs, milk, nursery stock, cattle, sweet potatoes, cotton, and soybeans. North Carolina is the leading producer of tobacco in the country. As one of North Carolina's earliest sources of revenue, it remains vital to the local economy.

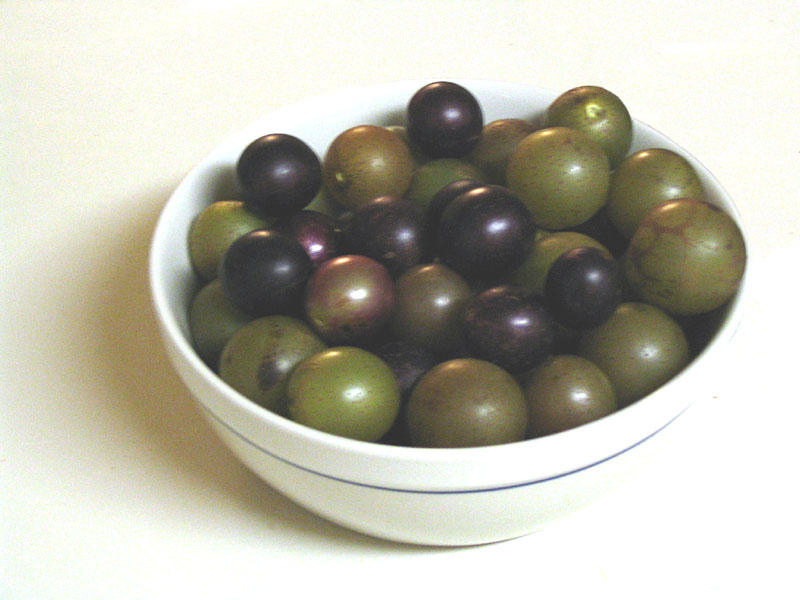
Green scuppernongs and dark muscadines

The cultivated productions of the state's mountainous areas include sweet corn, wheat, oats, barley, hay, tobacco, fruits, and vegetables. Cattle are also reared extensively for market, and large numbers of chickens are raised for market in the northwestern mountains and foothills. A prominent new industry in the mountains is the raising and selling of Christmas trees. In the Piedmont region of central North Carolina are found all the products of the mountains, and in the southern half of the state cotton appears as the staple product. In the deep, loamy soils of the coastal region, cotton, corn, and oats are the staple crops, and truck farming (growing fruits and vegetables for northern markets), constitutes a flourishing industry. Formerly longleaf pine forests produced tar, pitch and turpentine, and more recently lumber. Little old growth longleaf area is left; much has been replanted in loblolly pine, which is used for paper pulp, plywood, and lumber. Four of the grape varieties of America are native to North Carolina: the Catawba, Isabella, Lincoln, and Scuppernong.

== Employment ==
CNBC's list of "Top States for Business for 2010" recognized North Carolina as the fourth-best state in the nation, behind Texas, Virginia, and Colorado.

North Carolina is an at-will employment state, meaning employees in the private sector may be dismissed without prior notice or reason.

In October 2019, the unemployment rate was 4%.

== Energy ==
=== Solar power ===
The economic viability of solar energy is heavily influenced by political and technological factors. Political dynamics play a critical role in shaping renewable energy policy, with barriers such as political polarization and protection of incumbent industries often hindering the adoption of solar power. Long-term analyses of U.S. policies demonstrate how favorable regulations can accelerate solar adoption, a consideration particularly relevant to North Carolina. With its abundant agricultural land, and its relative political power as a swing state, the state has been identified as having significant potential for further solar energy expansion, supported by policy measures and technological advancements .

In addition to federal incentives, the state has a renewable portfolio standard of 12.5% by 2021 and a state renewable energy tax credit, both of which have been credited with boosting solar installations. In June 2023, the Environmental Protection Agency released $7 billion for solar for all notice. This is a program that aims to expand solar to disadvantaged communities.

In North Carolina, the distribution of solar power production is mainly on land that is classified as agricultural land, at 63%. In North Carolina there exists potential growth for solar energy on this agricultural land. Specifically, land that has watersheds adjacent to the land. Furthermore, a 2018 Smithsonian Magazine article described North Carolina as likely being the national leader in the "solar shepherd phenomenon" – combining sheep farming with solar power plants to reduce the high costs of grass trimming. A drawback of distributing solar power on agricultural land is the land that can potentially be lost for crops. There are debates of whether solar will harm agriculture.

Duke Energy is a large energy providing company. They have been playing a role in implementing solar in North Carolina, making it second in the nation for most solar energy usage. In 2017, they helped develop laws that allowed the implementation of solar and made it more affordable.

According to a report from the Solar Energy Industries Association, as of June 2019, North Carolina generates 5.81% of its electricity through solar power, and ranks second (up from third in 2018) in total installed photovoltaics. As of 2023 this number is up to 9.33% being ranked 4th.

=== Wind power ===
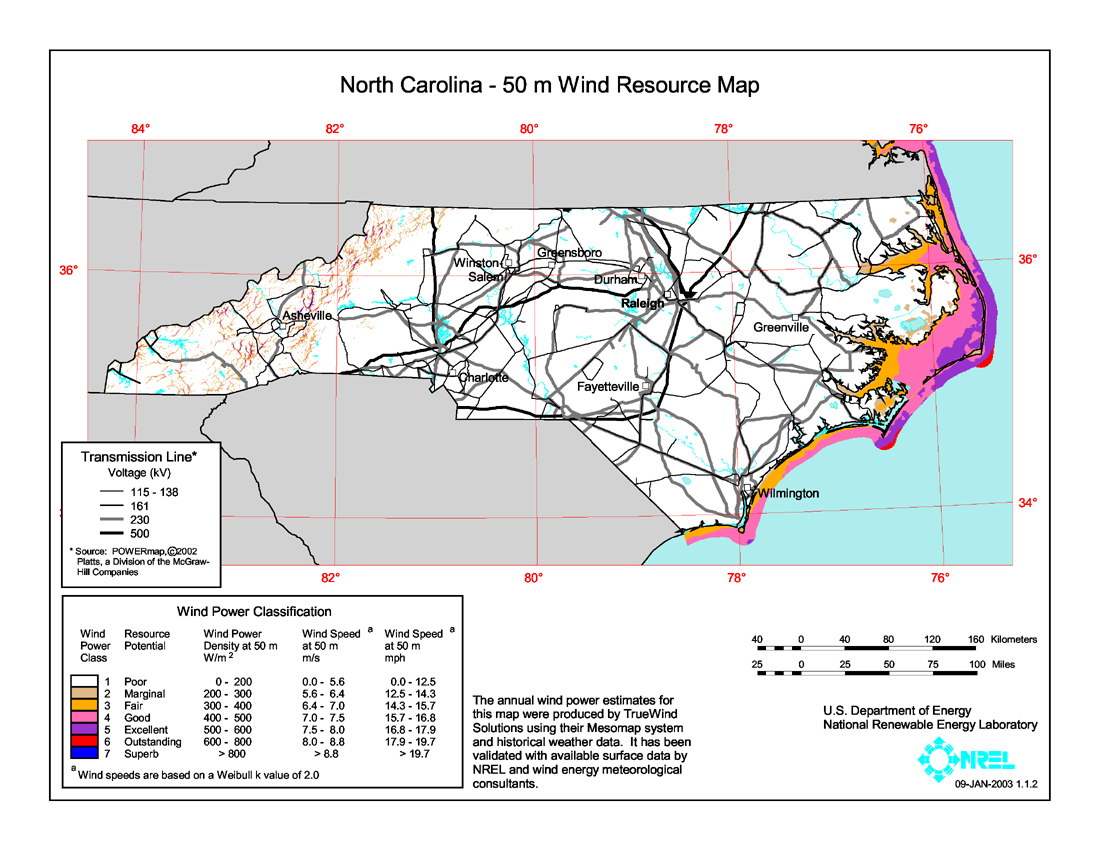
2003 US Department of Energy wind resource map of North Carolina

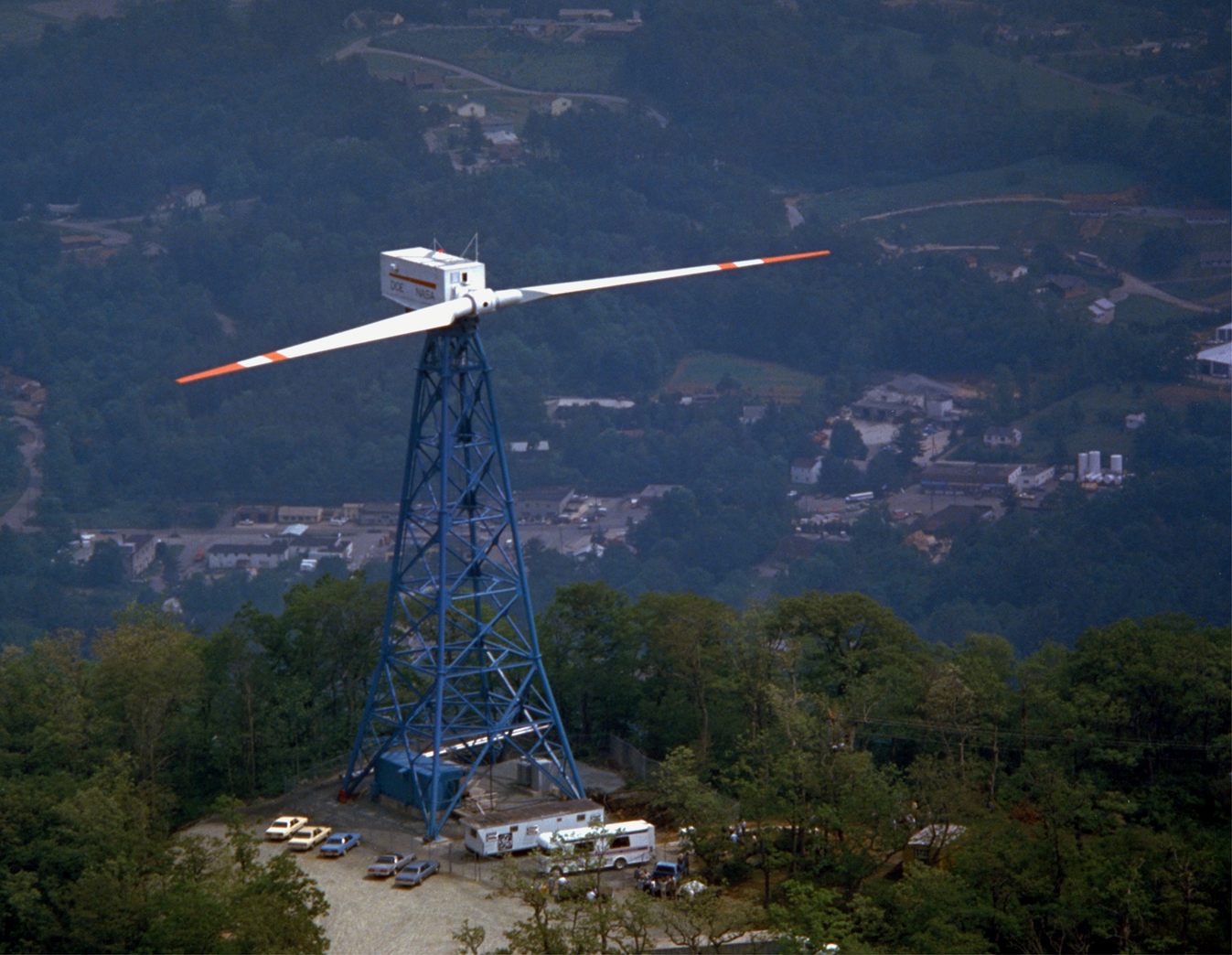
Experimental NASA wind turbine on Howard's Knob in Boone (1978–1983)

Wind power in North Carolina is found along the coastal areas in the east and mountain regions in the western part of the state. The state has significant offshore wind resources. In 2015, small-scale wind turbine projects were found throughout the state. In 2016, North Carolina's first large scale wind project, and the first in the southeastern U.S., was completed near Elizabeth City.

In 2019, North Carolina had an installed wind capacity of 208 MW.

== Finance, technology, and research ==
Charlotte, North Carolina's largest city, continues to experience rapid growth, in large part due to the banking and finance industry. Charlotte is the second-largest banking center in the United States (after New York), and is home to Bank of America and Truist Financial. The Charlotte metro area is also home to 6 other Fortune 500 companies.

The capital city of Raleigh is where SAS Institute, one of the world's largest privately held software companies, and CaptiveAire Systems, the largest privately held kitchen ventilation systems company in the country, were founded.

The information and biotechnology industries have been steadily on the rise since the creation of the Research Triangle Park (RTP) in the 1950s. Located between Raleigh, Durham, and Chapel Hill, it is a globally prominent research center home to over 170 companies and federal agencies and is the largest and oldest continuously operating research and science park in the United States. Anchored by the University of North Carolina in Chapel Hill, Duke University in Durham, and North Carolina State University in Raleigh, the park's proximity to these research universities has no doubt helped to fuel growth.

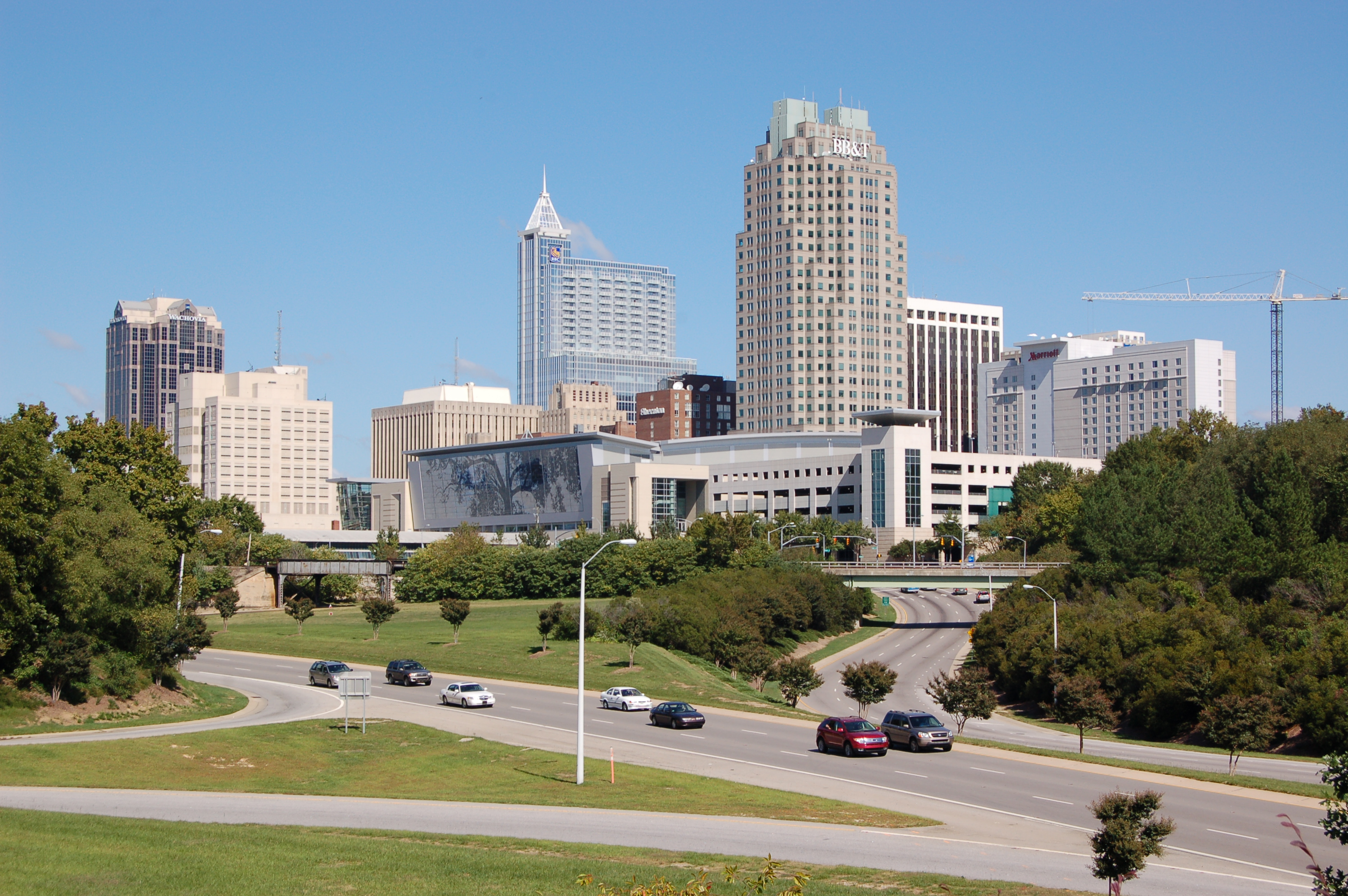
Raleigh, the growing capital of North Carolina

The North Carolina Research Campus underway in Kannapolis (approx. 30 miles (48 km) northeast of Charlotte) aims to enrich and bolster the Charlotte area in the same way that RTP changed the Raleigh-Durham region. Encompassing 5,800,000 square feet (540,000 m^{2}), the complex is a collaborative project involving Duke University, University of North Carolina at Charlotte, University of North Carolina at Chapel Hill, and N.C. State University, along with private and corporate investors and developers. The facility incorporates corporate, academic, commercial and residential space, oriented toward research and development (R&D) and biotechnology.

Similarly, the Wake Forest Innovation Quarter (formerly the Piedmont Triad Research Park) is a multi-university collaboration in Winston-Salem that specializes in digital media, advanced materials, biomedical science and information technology. In 2006, University of North Carolina at Greensboro and North Carolina A&T State University joined forces to create the Gateway Research Park, a technology-based research entity which focuses its efforts on areas such as nanotechnology, biotechnology & biochemistry, environmental sciences, and genetics among other science-based disciplines.

== Film and the arts ==
Film studios are located in Shelby, Raleigh, Durham, Charlotte, Asheville, Wilmington, and Winston-Salem. Wilmington is the home of EUE Screen Gems Studios, the largest domestic television and film production facility outside of California. "Dream Stage 10," the facility's newest sound stage, is the third-largest in the US. It houses the largest special-effects water tank in North America. Since the studio's opening in 1984, Wilmington has become a major center of American film and television production with more than 300 productions under its belt. Some of the best-known films and television series filmed in the state include: Forrest Gump, Bull Durham, Richie Rich, Divine Secrets of the Ya-Ya Sisterhood, All the Real Girls, The Secret Life of Bees, Being There, Blue Velvet, A Walk to Remember, Glory, The Color Purple, Cabin Fever, Super Mario Bros., Cape Fear, Children of the Corn, The Crow, Cyborg, Dawson's Creek, Dirty Dancing, Evil Dead II, The Fugitive, The Green Mile, Hannibal, The Last of the Mohicans, Maximum Overdrive, Nell, One Tree Hill, Patch Adams, Junebug, Shallow Hal, Talladega Nights: The Ballad of Ricky Bobby, Teenage Mutant Ninja Turtles III, Leatherheads, Nights in Rodanthe, The Hunger Games trilogy and 28 Days. Half of Stephen King's films were filmed in North Carolina.

The television show most associated with North Carolina is The Andy Griffith Show, which aired on CBS-TV from 1960 to 1968. The series is set in the fictional small town of Mayberry, North Carolina, and was based on the real-life town of Mount Airy, North Carolina, although it was filmed in California. Mount Airy is the hometown of actor Andy Griffith. The show is still popular in reruns and is frequently shown in syndication around the nation. North Carolina is also home to some of the Southeast's biggest film festivals, including the National Black Theatre Festival, RiverRun International Film Festival in Winston-Salem, Full Frame Documentary Film Festival in Durham, North Carolina, and the BluMoon Film Festival in Greenville, North Carolina.

== Tourism ==
Tourism destinations in the state include amusement parks, golf, wineries, beaches, mountains, and sports venues. The North Carolina tourism industry employs more than 190,000 people. The state is the 6th most visited in the country (preceded by Florida, California, New York, Nevada and Pennsylvania). The North Carolina Department of Commerce maintains a Tourism Services providing matching funds and consultation for development tourism in the state including rural tourism.

== Tax revenue ==
North Carolina personal income tax is flat, with a 4.25% rate. The base state sales tax is 4.25%. Most taxable sales or purchases are subject to the state tax as well as the 2.5% local tax rate levied by all counties, for a combined 6.75%. Mecklenburg County has an additional 0.5% local tax for public transportation, bringing sales taxes there to a total 7.25%. In addition, there is a 30.2¢ tax per gallon of gas, a 45¢ tax per pack of cigarettes, a 79¢ tax on wine, and a 48¢ tax on beer. There are also additional taxes levied against food, normally totaling 2%, and some counties assess a 1% tax on prepared food.

The property tax in North Carolina is locally assessed and collected by the counties. The three main elements of the property tax system in North Carolina are real property, motor vehicles and personal property (inventories and household personal property are exempt). Estimated at 10.5% of income, North Carolina's state and local tax burden percentage ranks 23rd highest nationally (taxpayers pay an average of $3,526 per-capita), just below the national average of 10.6%. North Carolina ranks 10th in the Tax Foundation's State Business Tax Climate Index with neighboring states ranked as follows: Tennessee (14th), Georgia (32nd), South Carolina (31st) and Virginia (26th).
