= Boone, North Carolina =

Town in the United States

Boone
- Town
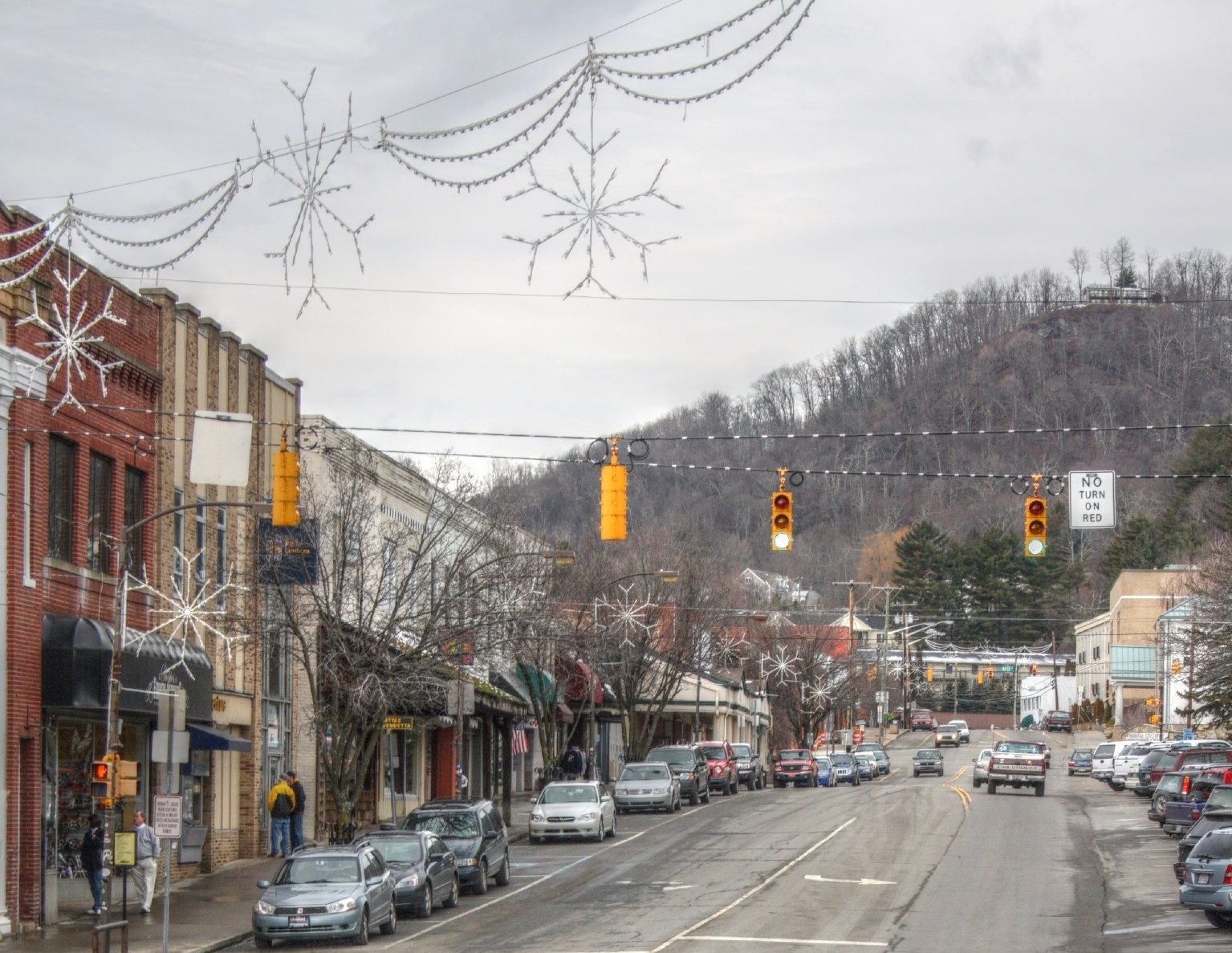
- West King Street

- Flag Seal
- Nickname: The Heart of the High Country
- Location within North Carolina Location within the United States
- Coordinates: 36°12′40″N 81°40′01″W
- Country: United States
- State: North Carolina
- County: Watauga
- Incorporated: 1872
- Named after: Daniel Boone

Government
  - Type: Council–manager
  - Mayor: Dalton George

Area
  - Total: 6.35 sq mi (16.45 km^{2})
  - Land: 6.33 sq mi (16.40 km^{2})
  - Water: 0.019 sq mi (0.05 km^{2})
- Elevation: 3,232 ft (985 m)

Population (2020)
  - Total: 19,092
  - Density: 3,010/sq mi (1,164/km^{2})
- Time zone: UTC−5 (Eastern (EST))
  - Summer (DST): UTC−4 (EDT)
- ZIP codes: 28607-28608
- Area code: 828
- FIPS code: 37-07080
- GNIS feature ID: 2405303
- Website: www.townofboone.net

Boone is a town in and the county seat of Watauga County, North Carolina, United States. Located in the Blue Ridge Mountains of western North Carolina, Boone is the home of Appalachian State University and the headquarters of the disaster and medical relief organization Samaritan's Purse. The population was 19,092 at the 2020 census.

The town is named for famous American pioneer and explorer Daniel Boone, and every summer since 1952 the town has hosted an outdoor amphitheatre drama, Horn in the West, portraying the British settlement of the area during the American Revolutionary War and featuring the contributions of its namesake. It is the largest community and the economic hub of the seven-county region of Western North Carolina known as the High Country.

== History ==
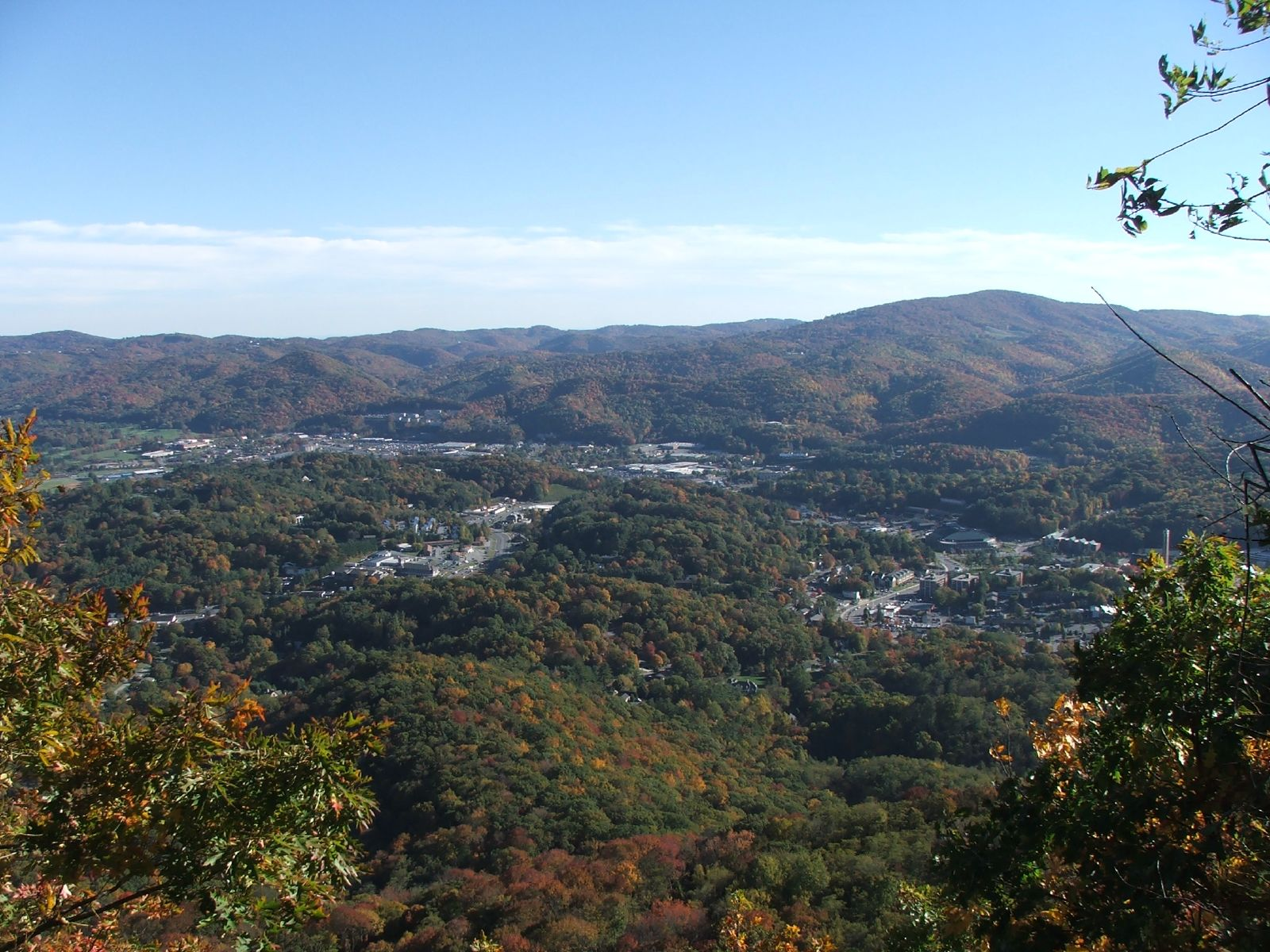
Boone as seen from Howard Knob

Boone took its name from the famous pioneer and explorer Daniel Boone, who on several occasions camped at a site generally agreed to be within the present city limits. Daniel's nephews, Jesse and Jonathan (sons of brother Israel Boone), were members of the town's first church, Three Forks Baptist, still in existence today.

Boone was served by the narrow-gauge East Tennessee and Western North Carolina Railroad (nicknamed "Tweetsie") until the flood of 1940. The flood washed away much of the tracks and it was decided not to replace them.

Boone is notable for being home to the Junaluska community. Located in the hills just north of Downtown Boone, a free black community has existed in the area since before the Civil War. Although integration in the mid-20th century led to many of the businesses in the neighborhood closing in favor of their downtown counterparts, descendants of the original inhabitants still live in the neighborhood. Junaluska is also home to one of the few majority-African American Mennonite Brethren congregations.

== Geography ==
Boone has an elevation of 3,333 feet (1,016 m) above sea level. An earlier survey gave the elevation as 3,332 ft and since then it has been published as 3,333 ft (1,016 m).

=== Climate ===
Boone has the highest elevation of any town of its size (over 10,000 population) east of the Mississippi River. As such, Boone features, depending on the isotherm used, a warm-summer humid continental climate (Köppen Dfb), a rarity for the Southeastern United States, bordering on an oceanic climate (Cfb) and straddles the boundary between USDA Plant Hardiness Zones 6B and 7A; the elevation also results in enhanced precipitation, with 59.13 inches (1,500 mm) of average annual precipitation. Compared to the lower elevations of the Carolinas, winters are long and cold, with frequent sleet and snowfall. The daily average temperature in January is 31.5 °F (−0.3 °C), which gives Boone a winter climate more similar to coastal southern New England rather than the Southeast, where a humid subtropical climate (Cfa) predominates. Blizzard-like conditions are not unusual during winters. Summers are warm, but far cooler and less humid than lower regions to the south and east, with a July daily average temperature of 68.4 °F (20.2 °C). Boone receives on average nearly 25 inches (64 cm) of snowfall annually, far higher than the lowland areas in the rest of North Carolina. On January 21, 1985, the temperature fell to −24 °F (−31 °C).

Climate data for Boone, North Carolina (1991–2020 normals, extremes 1929–present)
Month	Jan	Feb	Mar	Apr	May	Jun	Jul	Aug	Sep	Oct	Nov	Dec	Year
Record high °F (°C)	78 (26)	75 (24)	81 (27)	89 (32)	87 (31)	94 (34)	96 (36)	91 (33)	92 (33)	87 (31)	80 (27)	73 (23)	93 (34)
Mean maximum °F (°C)	60.1 (15.6)	62.5 (16.9)	69.9 (21.1)	76.7 (24.8)	80.2 (26.8)	83.9 (28.8)	85.6 (29.8)	84.5 (29.2)	81.3 (27.4)	75.6 (24.2)	68.1 (20.1)	61.5 (16.4)	86.9 (30.5)
Mean daily maximum °F (°C)	41.4 (5.2)	44.7 (7.1)	51.7 (10.9)	61.7 (16.5)	69.4 (20.8)	75.8 (24.3)	79.0 (26.1)	77.8 (25.4)	72.2 (22.3)	63.0 (17.2)	53.0 (11.7)	45.0 (7.2)	61.2 (16.2)
Daily mean °F (°C)	31.5 (−0.3)	34.2 (1.2)	40.5 (4.7)	49.3 (9.6)	57.6 (14.2)	64.7 (18.2)	68.4 (20.2)	67.1 (19.5)	61.3 (16.3)	51.2 (10.7)	41.3 (5.2)	34.9 (1.6)	50.2 (10.1)
Mean daily minimum °F (°C)	21.6 (−5.8)	23.8 (−4.6)	29.2 (−1.6)	36.9 (2.7)	45.8 (7.7)	53.7 (12.1)	57.7 (14.3)	56.3 (13.5)	50.3 (10.2)	39.3 (4.1)	29.6 (−1.3)	24.7 (−4.1)	39.1 (3.9)
Mean minimum °F (°C)	3.9 (−15.6)	8.8 (−12.9)	14.3 (−9.8)	24.3 (−4.3)	32.6 (0.3)	43.6 (6.4)	49.6 (9.8)	48.5 (9.2)	38.4 (3.6)	26.2 (−3.2)	17.6 (−8.0)	10.2 (−12.1)	1.5 (−16.9)
Record low °F (°C)	−24 (−31)	−8 (−22)	−6 (−21)	13 (−11)	24 (−4)	33 (1)	38 (3)	33 (1)	25 (−4)	14 (−10)	−6 (−21)	−11 (−24)	−24 (−31)
Average precipitation inches (mm)	4.39 (112)	3.64 (92)	4.77 (121)	5.52 (140)	5.46 (139)	5.59 (142)	5.11 (130)	5.56 (141)	5.73 (146)	4.69 (119)	4.44 (113)	4.23 (107)	59.13 (1,502)
Average snowfall inches (cm)	6.6 (17)	6.7 (17)	4.8 (12)	1.0 (2.5)	0.0 (0.0)	0.0 (0.0)	0.0 (0.0)	0.0 (0.0)	0.0 (0.0)	0.3 (0.76)	1.0 (2.5)	5.2 (13)	25.6 (65)
Average extreme snow depth inches (cm)	4.3 (11)	3.9 (9.9)	3.4 (8.6)	0.6 (1.5)	0.0 (0.0)	0.0 (0.0)	0.0 (0.0)	0.0 (0.0)	0.0 (0.0)	0.2 (0.51)	0.7 (1.8)	3.8 (9.7)	8.4 (21)
Average precipitation days (≥ 0.01 in)	11.7	11.5	12.3	12.9	14.0	14.3	14.1	13.3	10.9	9.8	9.2	11.9	145.9
Average snowy days (≥ 0.1 in)	3.7	3.8	2.5	0.7	0.0	0.0	0.0	0.0	0.0	0.2	0.7	2.6	14.6
Source: NOAA

== Demographics ==
Historical population
Census	Pop.	Note	%±
1880	167		—
1890	144		−13.8%
1900	155		7.6%
1910	179		15.5%
1920	374		108.9%
1930	1,295		246.3%
1940	1,788		38.1%
1950	2,973		66.3%
1960	3,686		24.0%
1970	8,754		137.5%
1980	10,191		16.4%
1990	12,915		26.7%
2000	13,472		4.3%
2010	17,122		27.1%
2020	19,092		11.5%
U.S. Decennial Census

=== 2020 census ===
As of the 2020 census, Boone had a population of 19,092. The median age was 21.6 years. 7.1% of residents were under the age of 18 and 6.7% of residents were 65 years of age or older. For every 100 females there were 78.7 males, and for every 100 females age 18 and over there were 77.2 males age 18 and over.

99.5% of residents lived in urban areas, while 0.5% lived in rural areas.

There were 6,251 households in Boone, of which 11.3% had children under the age of 18 living in them. Of all households, 16.8% were married-couple households, 34.8% were households with a male householder and no spouse or partner present, and 42.7% were households with a female householder and no spouse or partner present. About 40.1% of all households were made up of individuals and 7.5% had someone living alone who was 65 years of age or older. There were 1,641 families residing in the town.

There were 7,217 housing units, of which 13.4% were vacant. The homeowner vacancy rate was 1.6% and the rental vacancy rate was 4.6%.

Boone racial composition
Race	Number	Percentage
White (non-Hispanic)	13,701	71.76%
Black or African American (non-Hispanic)	1,783	9.34%
Native American	31	0.16%
Asian	645	3.38%
Pacific Islander	7	0.04%
Other/Mixed	1,154	6.04%
Hispanic or Latino	1,771	9.28%

=== 2000 census ===
As of the census of 2000, there were 13,472 people, 4,374 households, and 1,237 families residing in the town. The population density was 2,307.0 people per square mile (890.7 people/km^{2}). There were 4,748 housing units at an average density of 813.0 per square mile (313.9/km^{2}). The racial makeup of the town was 93.98% White, 3.42% Black or African American, 0.30% Native American, 1.19% Asian, 0.05% Pacific Islander, 0.46% from other races, and 0.60% from two or more races. 1.64% of the population were Hispanic or Latino of any race.

There were 4,374 households, out of which 9.6% had children under the age of 18 living with them, 21.0% were married couples living together, 5.6% had a female householder with no husband present, and 71.7% were non-families. 38.4% of all households were made up of individuals, and 7.3% had someone living alone who was 65 years of age or older. The average household size was 1.97 and the average family size was 2.63.

In the town, the population was spread out, with 5.8% under 18, 65.9% from 18 to 24, 12.1% from 25 to 44, 9.1% from 45 to 64, and 7.1% who were 65 or older. The median age was 21 years. For every 100 females, there are 95.6 males. For every 100 females age 18 and over, there were 94.7 males.

The median income for a household in the town was $20,541, and the median income for a family was $49,762. The per capita income was $12,256. Males had a median income of $28,060 versus $20,000 for females. About 9.2% of families and 37.0% of the population were below the poverty line, including 6.3% of those under the age of 18 and 9.1% of those 65 and older.

== Arts and culture ==
Horn in the West is a dramatization of the life and times of the early settlers of the mountain area. It features Daniel Boone as one of its characters, and has been performed in an outdoor amphitheater near the town every summer since 1952, except for when COVID-19 necessitated canceling the 2020 performances.

The original actor in the role of "Daniel Boone" was Ned Austin. His "Hollywood Star" stands on a pedestal on King Street in downtown Boone. He was followed in the role by Glenn Causey, who portrayed the rugged frontiersman for 41 years, and whose image is still seen in many of the depictions of Boone featured in the area today.

Boone is a center for bluegrass musicians and Appalachian storytellers. Notable artists associated with Boone include the late Grammy Award-winning bluegrass guitar player Doc Watson and the late guitarist Michael Houser, one of the founding members of and the lead guitarist for the band Widespread Panic, as well as Old Crow Medicine Show, The Blue Rags, and Eric Church, all who are Boone natives.

The Blair Farm, Daniel Boone Hotel, Jones House, John Smith Miller House, and US Post Office-Boone are listed on the National Register of Historic Places.

The hellbender is an important cultural symbol of the city and is the namesake of various local establishments and products. In 2024, the Boone Town Council and the Center for Biological Diversity installed a large mural of the hellbender in downtown Boone to raise awareness of the species. In January 2024, Boone passed a resolution supporting the inclusion of the hellbender in the Endangered Species Act of 1973 to better protect its habitat.

=== Points of interest ===
- Appalachian State University
- Blue Ridge Parkway
- Boone Mall
- Daniel Boone Native Gardens
- Elk Knob State Park
- Grandfather Mountain
- Horn in the West
- Howard Knob
- Kidd-Brewer Stadium
- Tweetsie Railroad
- Watauga River

== Sports ==
Boone is home to the Appalachian State Mountaineers, which field varsity teams in 17 sports, 7 for men and 10 for women. Appalachian State's football program has been successful with the Mountaineers winning three straight national championships in 2005, 2006, and 2007, the only team in North Carolina, public or private, to win an NCAA national championship in football.

Aside from college sports, Boone also has local baseball and soccer teams. The Boone Bigfoots were formed in 2021 and compete in the Coastal Plain League, a wood-bat collegiate summer baseball league. The Bigfoots play their home games at Beaver Field at Jim and Bettie Smith Stadium. Boone's entry in the National Premier Soccer League is Appalachian FC, which plays home games at ASU Soccer Stadium in the Ted Mackorell Soccer Complex.

== Government ==
The Boone government was officially chartered in 1872.

Boone operates through a mayor-council government with a city council of five members. The mayor is Dalton George.

Boone’s government runs on several boards and commissions including the Alcoholic Beverage Commission, Board of Adjustment, Cultural Resources Advisory Board, and Downtown Boone Development Association.

=== Development ===
Industrial, commercial, and residential development in Boone is controversial due to its location in the mountains of Appalachia. On October 16, 2009, the town council accepted the "Boone 2030 Land Use Plan." The document is not in any way law, but is used by the town council, board of adjustment, and other committees to guide decision-making as to what types of development are appropriate.

In 2009, the North Carolina Department of Transportation began widening 1.1 miles of U.S. 421 (King Street) to a 4-to-6-lane divided highway with a raised concrete median from U.S. 321 (Hardin Street) to east of N.C. 194 (Jefferson Road), including a new entrance and exit to the new Watauga High School, at a cost of $16.2 million. The widening has displaced 25 businesses and 63 residences south of King Street. The project was slated to be completed by December 31, 2011, but construction continued into 2012.

== Education ==
Boone is the home of Appalachian State University, a constituent member of the University of North Carolina. Appalachian State is the sixth-largest university in the seventeen-campus system. Caldwell Community College & Technical Institute also operates a satellite campus in Boone.

== Media ==
=== Newspaper ===
Boone is mainly served by three local newspapers:

- The Watauga Democrat is published on Wednesdays and Sundays.
- The Mountain Times (free weekly entertainment publication).
- The High Country Press (daily online news publication).

A smaller newspaper, The Appalachian, is Appalachian State University's campus newspaper; it sends out email newsletters twice a week on Tuesdays and Thursdays during the regular academic year and publishes a print publication monthly. In addition to the locally printed papers, a monthly entertainment pamphlet, Kraut Creek Revival, has limited circulation and is funded by a Denver, North Carolina–based newspaper.

=== Radio ===
- WECR 1130 AM is an adult contemporary music radio station ("Star").
- WXIT 1200 AM is a top 40/contemporary hits radio station ("Pulse Boone").
- WATA-AM 1450 AM is a local news talk information radio station.
- WASU 90.5 FM is a college radio station from the Appalachian State University.
- WNCW 92.9 FM is a noncommercial NPR-affiliate public radio station licensed to Isothermal Community College.
- WATA-FM 96.5 FM is an alternate frequency of 1450 AM.
- W261CK 100.1 FM is a local translator for WFDD 88.1 FM, a noncommercial NPR-affiliate public radio station from Wake Forest University.
- WZJS 100.7 FM is a classic hits radio station.
- WWMY 102.3 FM is a country music radio station, broadcasting the same as 106.1 ("Highway 106.1/102.3").
- WMMY 106.1 FM is a country music radio station, broadcasting the same as 102.3 ("Highway 106.1/102.3").

== Notable people ==
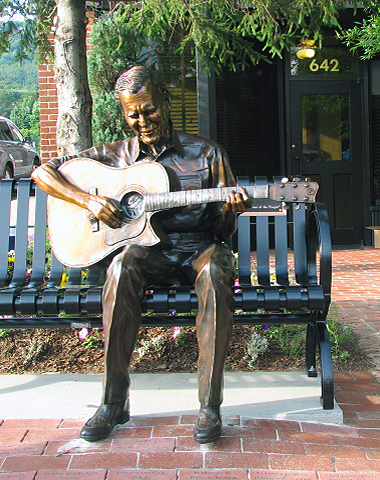
Doc Watson sculpture in downtown Boone

- Sam Adams, professional golfer who played on the PGA Tour
- Chris Austin, country music singer
- Gregory Bovino, U.S. Border Patrol officer
- Eustace Conway, American naturalist
- Bertha Cook, needlework artist (native of nearby Sands)
- Rufus L. Edmisten, former North Carolina Secretary of State and Attorney General
- Steve Goss, former North Carolina Senator and ordained Southern Baptist minister
- Franklin Graham, American evangelist and missionary, president and CEO of Samaritan's Purse
- Tommy Gregg, former MLB player
- Stanley A. Harris, Boy Scouts of America executive
- Doc Hendley, founder of Wine to Water, an American charitable organization
- John Hollar, former NFL player for the Washington Redskins and Detroit Lions
- James Holshouser, served as the 68th Governor of North Carolina
- Michael Houser, founding member and lead guitarist of the band Widespread Panic
- Ryder Jones, MLB player with the San Francisco Giants
- Bob Matheson, former NFL player and two-time Super Bowl champion with the Miami Dolphins
- Abraham Morlu, former CFL player and track Olympian, representing his birth country Liberia
- Stanley South, major proponent of the processual archaeology movement
- Brenda Taylor, Olympic hurdler who represented Team USA at the 2004 Athens Olympics
- Coaker Triplett, former MLB player for the Chicago Cubs, St. Louis Cardinals, and Philadelphia Phillies
- Doc Watson, bluegrass, gospel, blues, folk, and country singer

== Sister city ==
Boone has one sister city, as designated by Sister Cities International:

- Collingwood, Ontario, Canada
