= North Carolina Chamber of Commerce =

The North Carolina Chamber of Commerce is a business network and advocacy organization whose chief mission is to promote business interests in the state of North Carolina. The NC Chamber is an affiliate of the United States Chamber of Commerce. Its headquarters are located in Raleigh, NC.

== Priorities ==
The NC Chamber has identified three priorities, or "pillars of a strong future", that are critical to building a stronger economy in North Carolina:

1. Education and workforce development in public schools, community colleges, and universities.
2. A competitive business climate with business-friendly tax and regulatory systems.
3. Effective economic development strategies and tools, including business tax credits and incentives and infrastructure improvements.

The NC Chamber is active in numerous issues across the political, legislative, and regulatory arenas. These issues include: education & workforce development, energy, environmental & regulatory reform, health care, infrastructure, labor & workplace issues, manufacturing, taxes, tort reform & legal claim, unemployment insurance reform, and workers' compensation.

== Membership ==
The NC Chamber comprises several local chambers of commerce from cities, towns, counties, and regions across North Carolina. Member organizations include: Asheville Area Chamber of Commerce, Chapel Hill-Carrboro Chamber of Commerce, Charlotte Chamber of Commerce, Greensboro Chamber of Commerce, Raleigh Chamber of Commerce, Wilmington Chamber of Commerce, and Winston-Salem Chamber of Commerce.

== Financial Support ==
The NC Chamber receives financial support from numerous North Carolina businesses and corporations. NC Chamber supporters and investors include: AT&T North Carolina, Bank of America, Case Farms, Coastal AgroBusiness, Food Lion, GlaxoSmithKline, Harris Teeter Supermarkets, Hillshire Farms, Hog Slat, Pilgrim's, Reynolds American, Smithfield Foods, Valley Proteins, and Wal-Mart Stores.

== Activities ==
=== Awards ===
The NC Chamber presents annual awards to individuals who have made significant contributions to the economy of North Carolina. In 2013, the NC Chamber presented the Corning Award for Distinguished Citizenship to pork producer Wendell H. Murphy, former chairman and CEO of Murphy Family Farms, an affiliate of Smithfield Foods. The 2013 Award for Distinguished Public Service was presented to The Honorable David Hoyle, former NC Secretary of Revenue and member of the North Carolina State Senate.

=== Conferences ===
The NC Chamber coordinates numerous annual conferences, including the NC Conference on Education, Energy Conference, Environmental Management Summit, Government Affairs Conference, Health Care Summit, Manufacturing Summit, and Tax Conference.

=== Legislation ===
The NC Chamber is a lobbying organization that actively promotes business interests in the North Carolina General Assembly, the state's law-making body.

==== NC Commerce Protection Act of 2013 ====
The NC Chamber, along with the North Carolina Commerce Coalition, was a major supporter of the NC Commerce Protection Act of 2013 (Senate Bill 648). This legislation, commonly referred to as an ag-gag bill, seeks to criminalize undercover investigations by journalists and advocates seeking to document and expose illegal activity on industrial farms and other food production facilities. The NC Chamber supported the NC Commerce Protection Act as a way to strengthen employment fraud prevention and reduce litigation against businesses.

Opponents of the NC Commerce Protection Act expressed concern that the legislation would hinder animal cruelty and human welfare investigations at North Carolina's many agricultural and food production facilities and prevent prosecution of animal abusers. Undercover investigations have been successful in exposing animal cruelty and food safety violations. Several North Carolina newspapers published editorials and opinions opposing the NC Commerce Protection Act, including the Fayetteville Observer, the News & Observer, and the Wilson Times

The NC Commerce Protection Act has been opposed by numerous worker and animal advocacy groups, including the American Civil Liberties Union (ACLU), the American Society for the Prevention of Cruelty to Animals (ASPCA), Amnesty International, the Humane Society of the United States (HSUS), the North Carolina Justice Center, the NC Press Association, and United Farm Workers.

In May 2013, the Humane Society of the United States aired a television commercial criticizing the NC Chamber's support of the NC Commerce Protection Act and the bill's hindrance of animal cruelty investigations The NC Chamber responded in a statement that the bill would strengthen cruelty reporting guidelines.

=== Political Action Committee ===
The NC Chamber has an affiliated NC Chamber PAC (political action committee). The North Carolina Chamber PAC endorses candidates who are committed to promoting a business-friendly agenda in the NC State Senate and NC House of Representatives.

=== Publications ===
The NC Chamber produces a variety of print and on-line publications and newsletters, including the bi-weekly Business Advocate, the Federation Insider, and NCBiz Central.
