= WTW =

WTW may stand for:

- Wakefield Trinity Wildcats, a rugby club based in Wakefield, England
- "Walk This Way", a song by Aerosmith
- Water treatment works
- Well-to-wheel, an analysis of fuel consumption
- Willis Towers Watson, a global multinational risk management, insurance brokerage and advisory company
- Wine to Water, a non-profit organization
- What3words, a geocode system designed to identify locations using words
