= Kidd Brewer Stadium =

Stadium in North Carolina

- "The Rock"
- "The Rock" in 2025

- Location in North Carolina Location in the United States
- Former names: Conrad Stadium (1962–1988)
- Location: 270 Stadium Dr; Boone, North Carolina 28608
- Coordinates: 36°12′42″N 81°41′08″W
- Owner: Appalachian State University
- Operator: Appalachian State University
- Capacity: 40,168 (2022–present); 30,000 (2017–2021); 24,050 (2012–16); 23,150 (2011); 21,650 (2009–2010); 20,150 (2008); 16,650 (1995–2007); 18,000 (1979–1994); 10,000 (1962–1978)
- Executive suites: 18
- Surface: FieldTurf (2003–present); Astroturf (1970–2002); Grass (1962–1969)
- Record attendance: 40,168
- Public transit: AppalCart

Construction
- Groundbreaking: 1960
- Opened: September 15, 1962
- Renovated: 1999, 2001, 2003, 2008, 2011, 2013, 2016, 2017
- Expanded: 1978, 1995, 2006, 2008, 2009, 2011-12, 2016, 2019-20
- Cost: $32 million (2008 expansion)
- Architects: Walter Robbs Callahan and Pierce (expansions)

Tenants
- Appalachian State Mountaineers (NCAA); Football (1962–present); Outdoor Track and Field (1962–2018); Field Hockey (1968–2014)

Kidd Brewer Stadium is a 40,168-seat multi-purpose stadium located in Boone, North Carolina. Nicknamed "The Rock," the stadium is the home of the Appalachian State Mountaineers football team. Kidd Brewer stands 3,333 feet (1,016 m) above sea level. The Mountaineers boast a 277–81–5 (.770) home record at the stadium.

== History ==
=== College Field ===
College Field, an earlier venue for the college team

College Field was Appalachian State University's college football stadium in Boone, North Carolina (36°12′52″N 81°40′55″W). The Mountaineers played at College Field from 1928 to 1961. The Mountaineers moved across campus to the Conrad Stadium in 1962.

=== Conrad Stadium ===
Officially opened on September 15, 1962, as Conrad Stadium, in honor of former university trustee and R. J. Reynolds executive William J. Conrad, the stadium was originally constructed with 10,000 permanent seats. It became the first venue in either North or South Carolina to install artificial turf. The Mountaineers and Elon staged the first game on artificial turf in the Carolinas on October 3, 1970. Seating capacity was expanded to 18,000 following the 1978 season. The stadium was the backdrop for the second college football game ever televised by ESPN as the Mountaineers played the Western Carolina Catamounts for the Old Mountain Jug in 1979.

Conrad Stadium was renamed on September 3, 1988 in honor of Kidd Brewer, one of the most successful head coaches in Appalachian football history and a colorful part of North Carolina history. Brewer, a Winston-Salem native, served as head football coach of the Mountaineers from 1935 to 1938, compiling a 30–5–3 overall mark in his four seasons at the helm of the Apps. An All-American at Duke, Brewer's 1937 squad was unbeaten and unscored upon in the regular season.

Appalachian carried a 30-game home winning streak, the longest in Division I at the time, before losing to the Georgia Southern Eagles on October 20, 2007. Prior to that game, the Mountaineers' last home loss was in the first round of the playoffs, 13–14, to Maine on November 30, 2002.

=== Renovations ===
Completion of an extensive renovation and restoration project on the original 10,000 seats in 1995 readjusted the seating capacity to 16,650. A then-state-of-the-art "AppVision" video board was added in 1999 and enlarged prior to the 2001 campaign. Appalachian State was also one of the initial collegiate programs in the country to install FieldTurf at its football stadium in 2003.

Following the 2006 season, the press box was removed to make way for a new 100,000-square-foot (9,290 m^{2}) stadium complex. The complex houses state-of-the-art strength and conditioning and athletic training facilities to benefit all 20 of Appalachian's varsity sports, as well as extensive locker rooms, academic, office and meeting space for ASU student-athletes, coaches and administrators. However, the most visible element of the crown jewel of ASU athletics' $50 million facilities enhancement campaign is the addition of premium seating on the stadium's west side, in the way of 18 luxury suites, 500 club seats and spacious Yosef Club and Chancellor's Box areas.

An additional 4,400 seats were added to the east side stands prior to the 2008 season, which brought the total seating capacity to 20,150. The addition of the new seats was completed in time for the home opener against Jacksonville on September 6, 2008. Also new for 2008 was an upgraded AppVision video board which was nearly double the size of the 2001 screen.

== Current ==
In 2009, the Kidd Brewer Stadium complex was completed prior to the home opener against McNeese State. Total seating capacity for 2009 was increased to 21,650 with the opening of the additional premium seating, which includes the 18 luxury suites and 500 club seats in the Yosef Club and Chancellor's Box areas. Prior to the 2011 season, temporary bleachers were installed behind the North Endzone. The additional 1,500 seats brought capacity to 23,150. The temporary section was further expanded prior to the 2012 season, which brought capacity to 24,050. 2013 saw small ribbon boards installed on the stadium's east and west seating areas.

In 2016, 2,500 seats were installed in the North end zone, replacing the previous bleachers, along with additional concession stands. This was done partly in preparation for a home game against the Miami Hurricanes. In 2017, plans were announced for a new video board and ribbon boards to be installed in August. The new board would be around three times as large as the former screen. The work was completed in time for the 2017 season. Along with the north end zone complex, 2020 also saw new FieldTurf installed and the hill behind the north end zone was regraded, bringing it closer to the field, as well as the removal of the track around the field.

=== End zone expansion ===
In 2018, App State approved a new north end zone expansion, replacing Owens Field House. The building adds around 1,000 seats to the stadium. It also accommodates a wide variety of athletics and academic uses. Construction started in 2019 and finished by the Spring of 2021. The North End Zone complex opened for the first home game of the 2021 season against Elon.

=== Largest Attendance ===
Rank	Attendance	Date	Opponent	Result
1	40,168	September 16, 2023	East Carolina	W 43–28
2	40,168	September 3, 2022	North Carolina	L 61–63
3	36,232	August 31, 2024	East Tennessee State	W 38–10
4	36,075	September 2, 2023	Gardner-Webb	W 45–24
5	35,126	September 23, 2017	Wake Forest	L 19–20
6	35,021	October 4, 2025	Oregon State	W 27–23
7	34,954	November 2, 2024	Old Dominion	W 28–20
8	34,921	September 6, 2025	Lindenwood	W 20-13
9	34,658	September 17, 2016	#25 Miami	L 10–45
10	34,406	September 17, 2022	Troy	W 32–28
11	34,252	October 10, 2023	Coastal Carolina	L 24–27
12	34,133	September 19, 2024	South Alabama	L 14–48

== Concerts ==
Kidd Brewer Stadium has hosted concerts by Appalachian State alumnus Luke Combs as well as Kenny Rogers, Kacey Musgraves, Jason Isbell, Darius Rucker, Lee Brice, and Little Big Town.

== Gallery ==
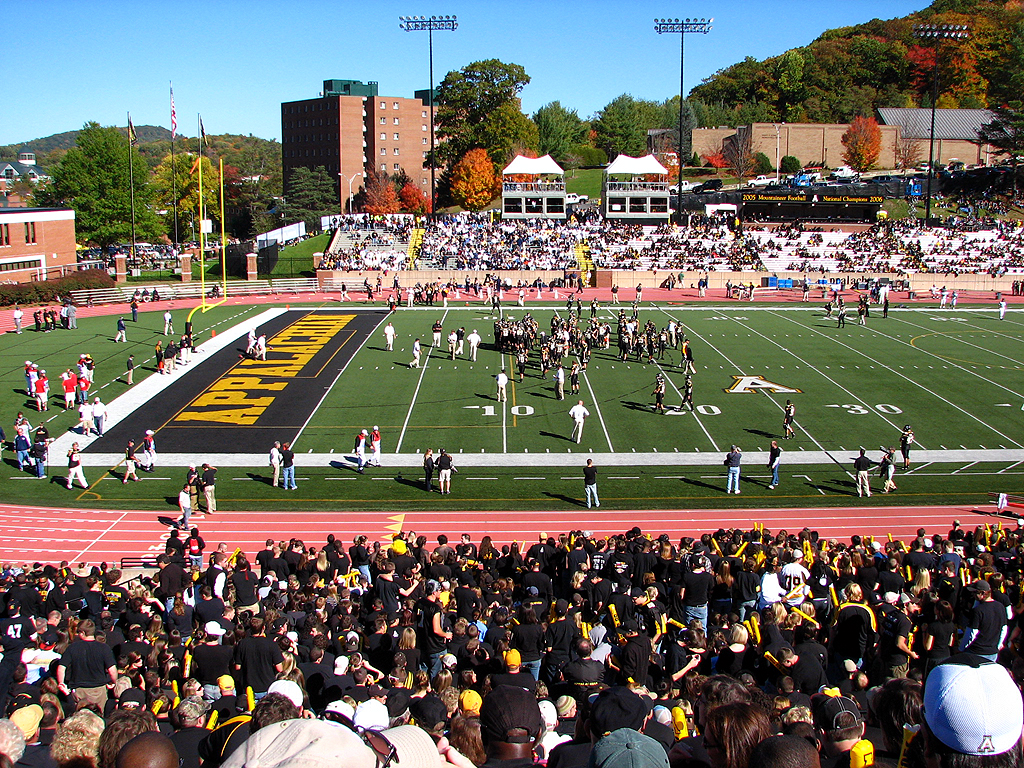
East stands in 2007

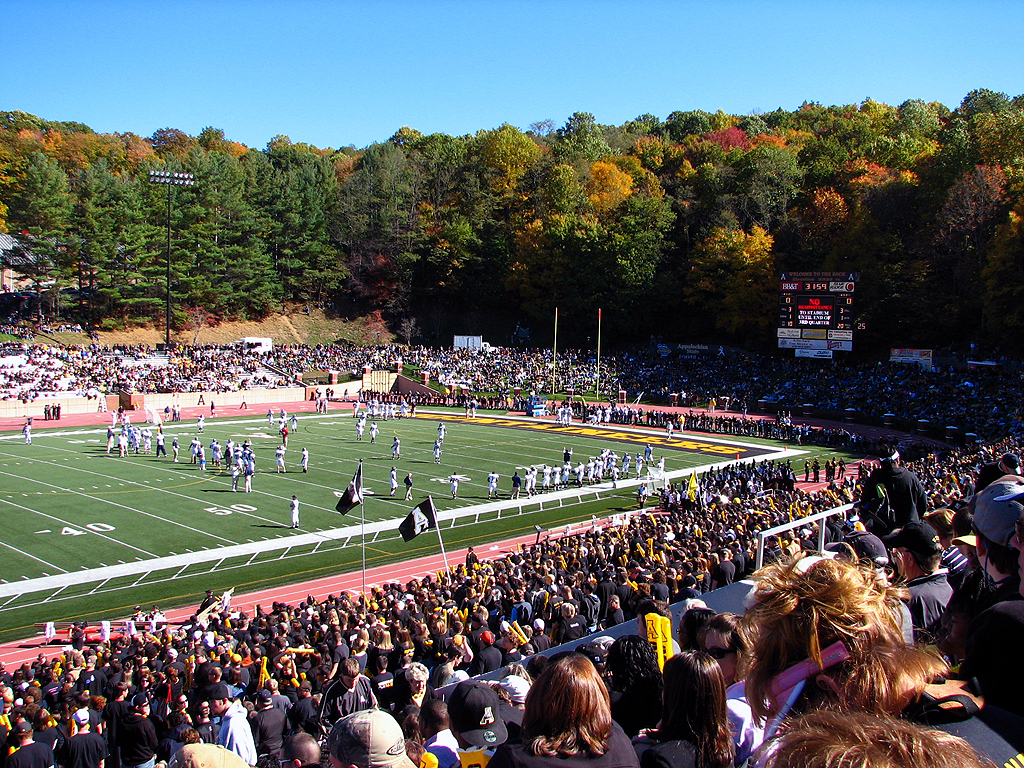
Stadium attendance routinely tops 20,000 with grass seating and standing room crowds

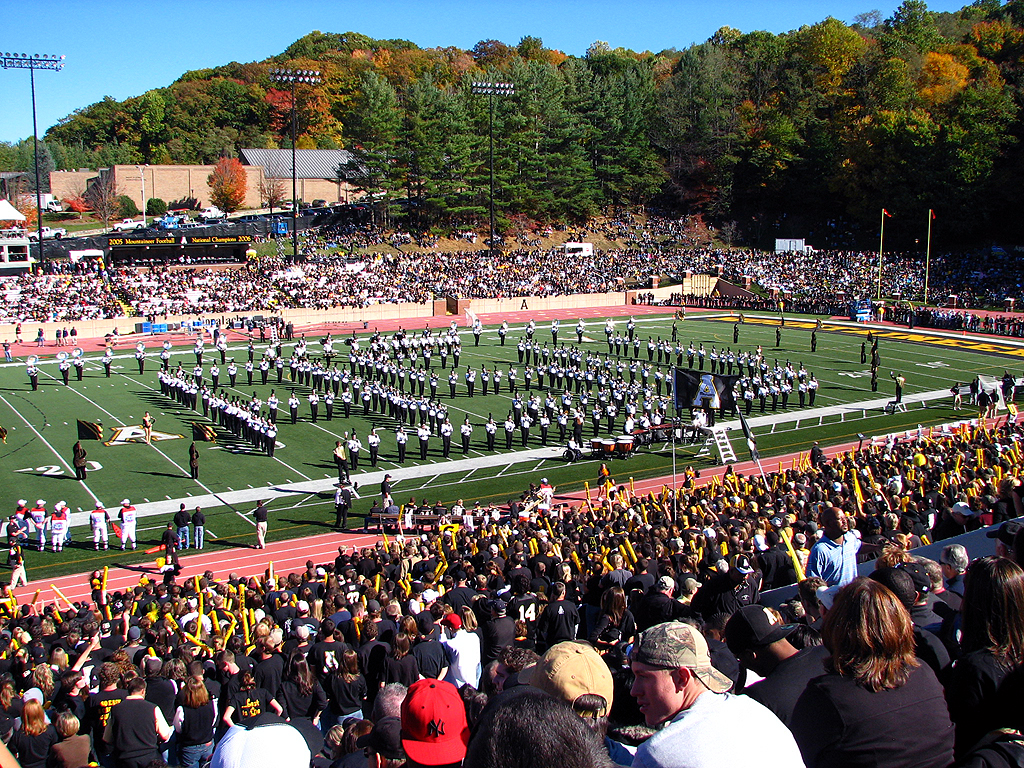
Marching Mountaineers performing prior to kick off in 2007

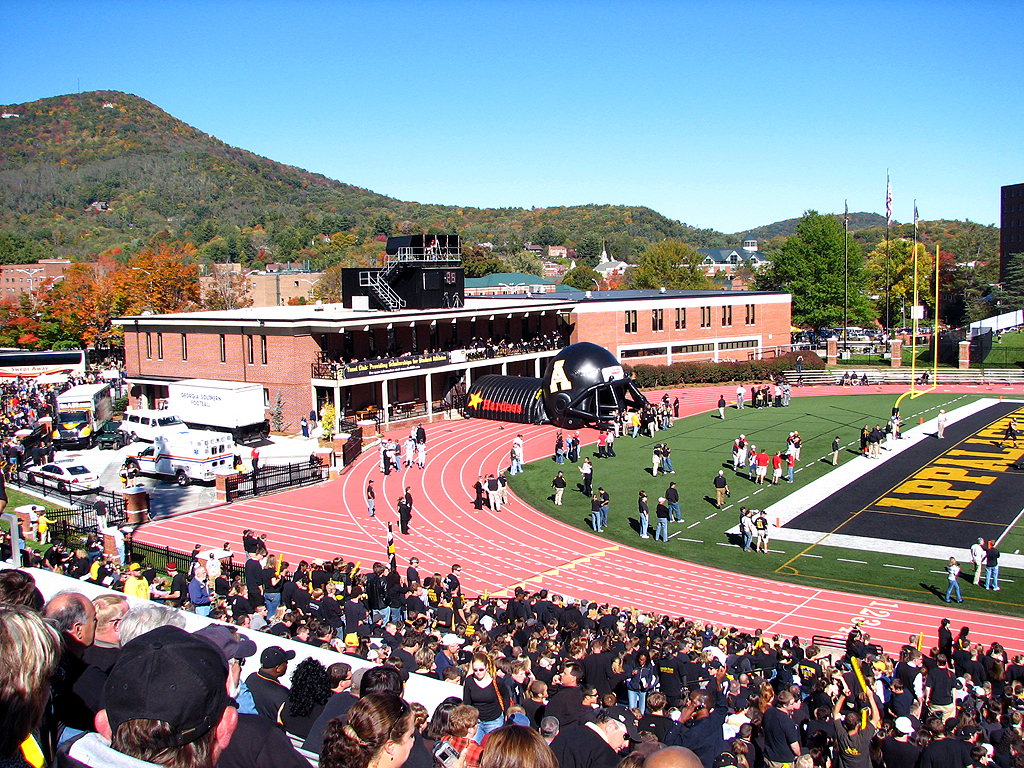
Owens Field House with Howard's Knob and Carol Grotnes Belk Library in the background in 2007

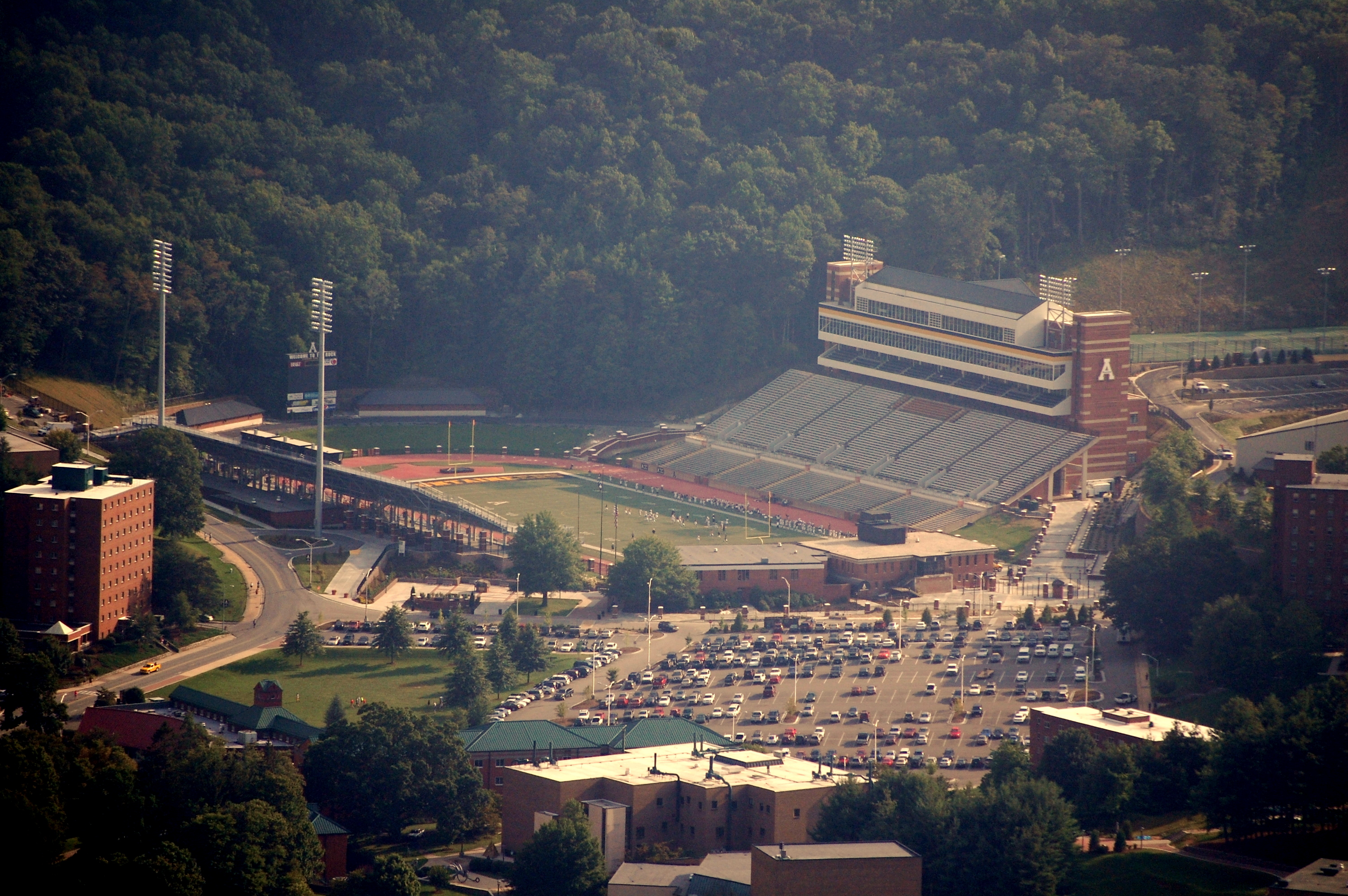
A shot from Howard's Knob of Kidd-Brewer Stadium in 2009

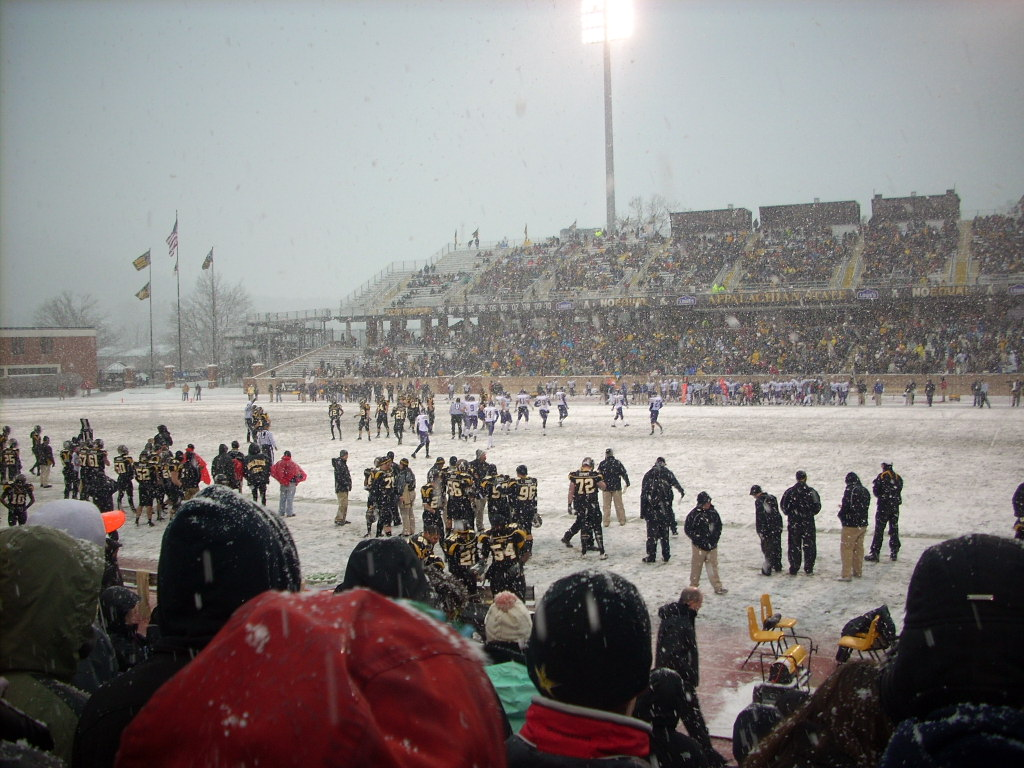
A snowy Kidd-Brewer Stadium played host to an NCAA Division I Football Championship playoff game between Appalachian State and Western Illinois on December 4, 2010

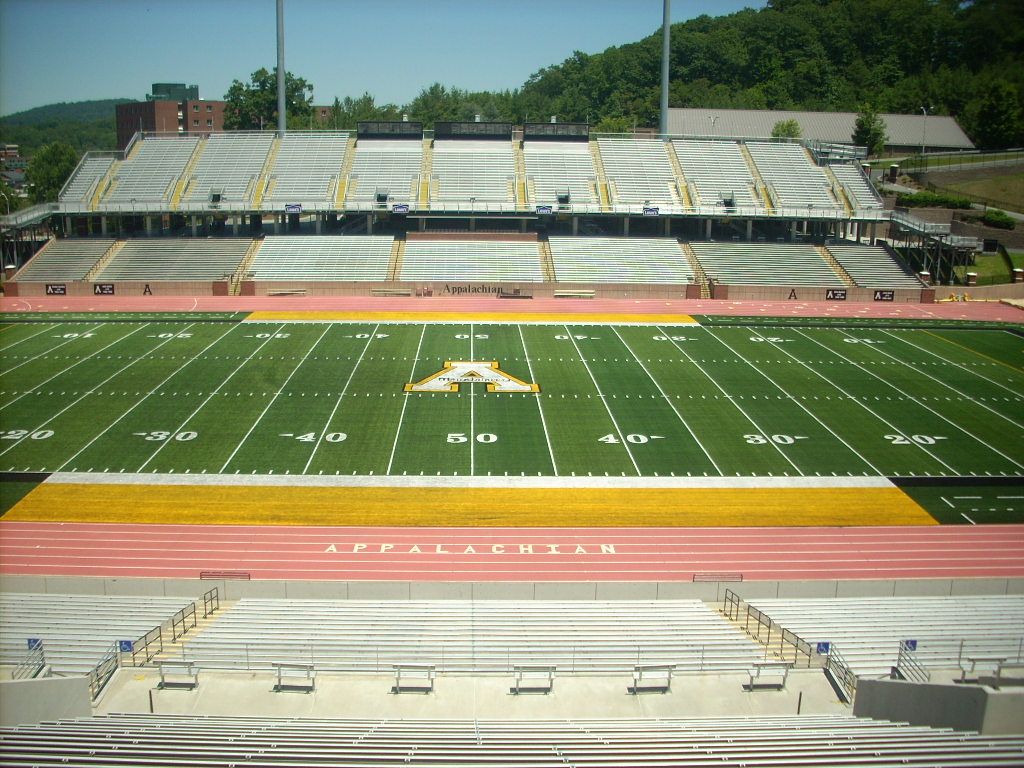
View of the East stands in 2011

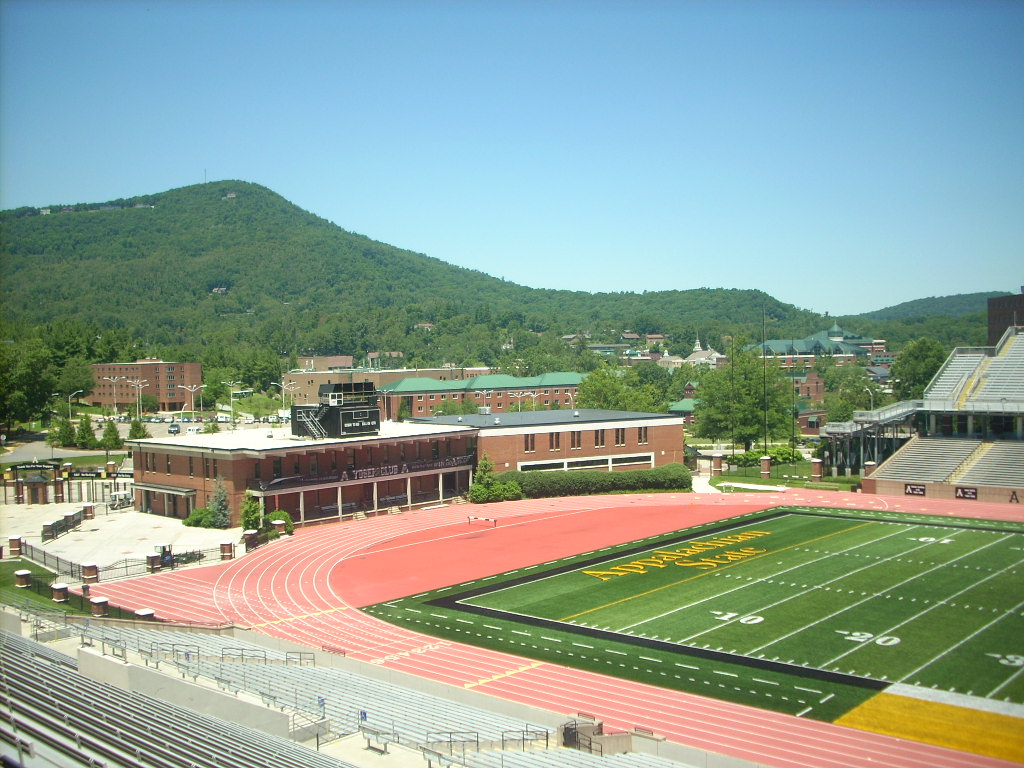
Howard's Knob and the Appalachian State University campus as seen from the West End Seats and the old Owens Field House in 2011

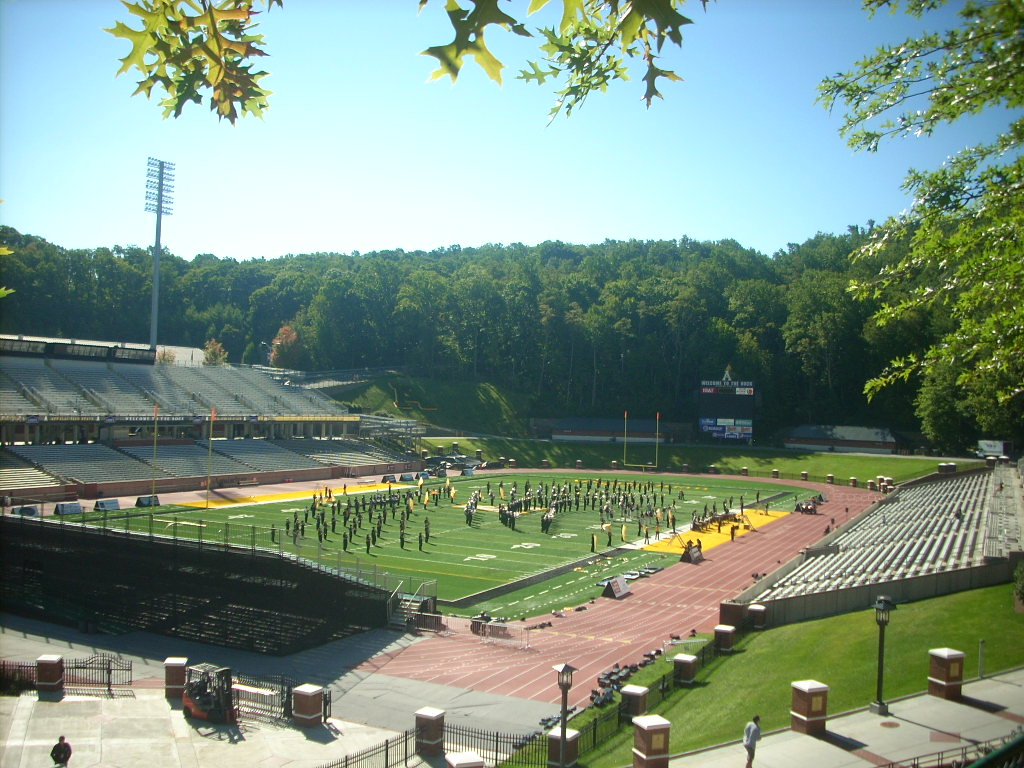
The Marching Mountaineers practice in the early morning hours in 2011

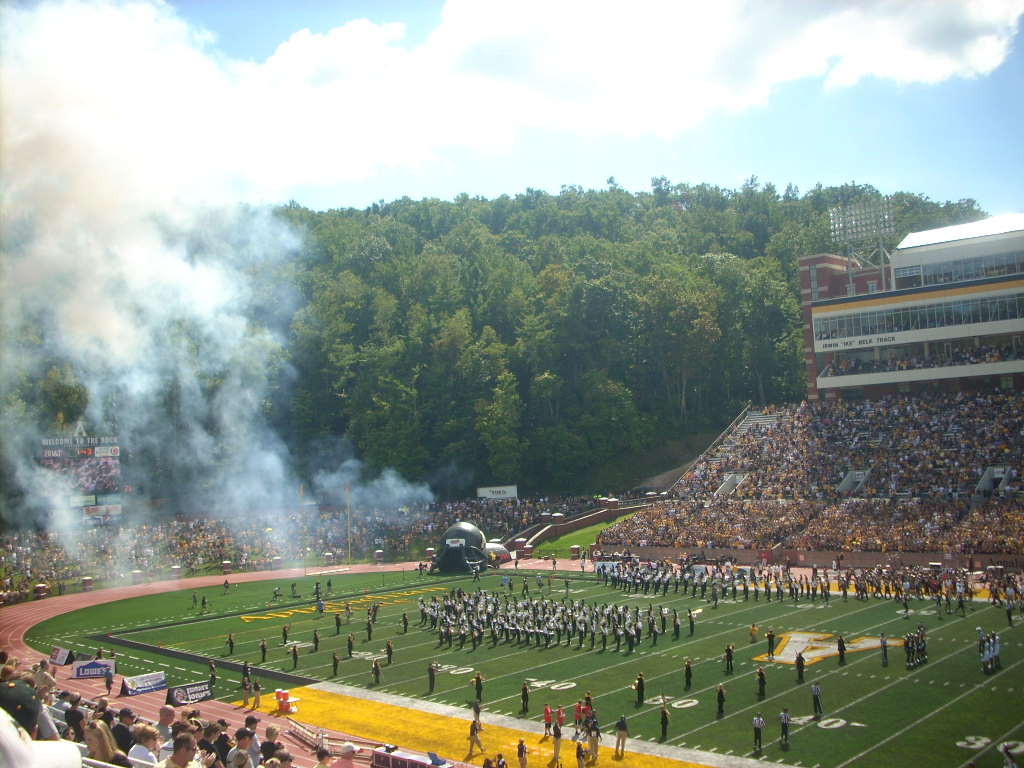
The Mountaineers take the field in 2011

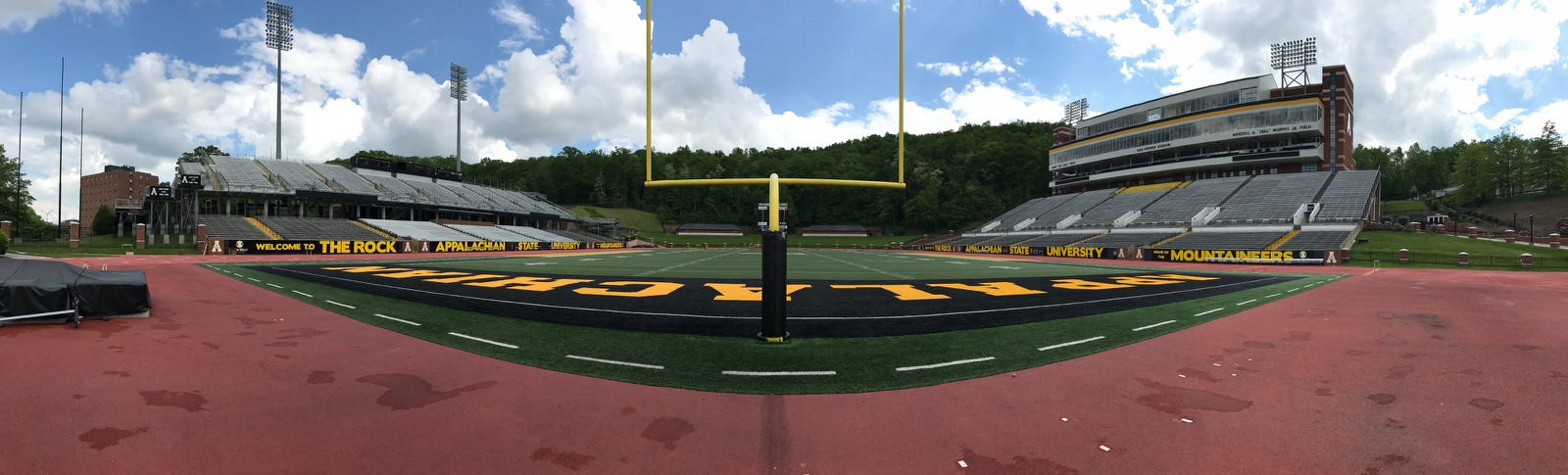
Panorama looking South towards the stadium in 2017

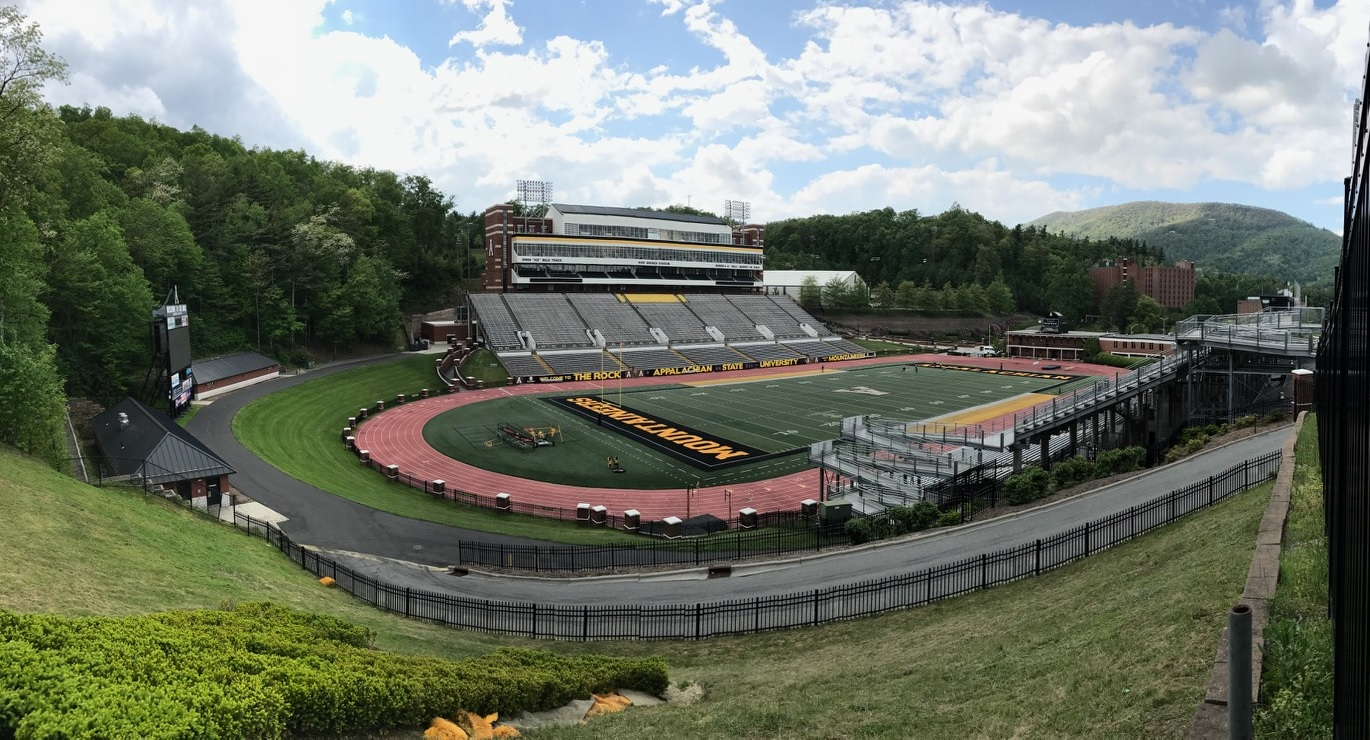
Panorama looking Northwest towards the stadium in 2017

After defeating nationally ranked Coastal Carolina on an ESPN nationally televised game in 2021, students and fans stormed the field in celebration

== See also ==
- List of NCAA Division I FBS football stadiums
