= Jones House (Boone, North Carolina) =

Historic house in North Carolina, United States

- U.S. National Register of Historic Places
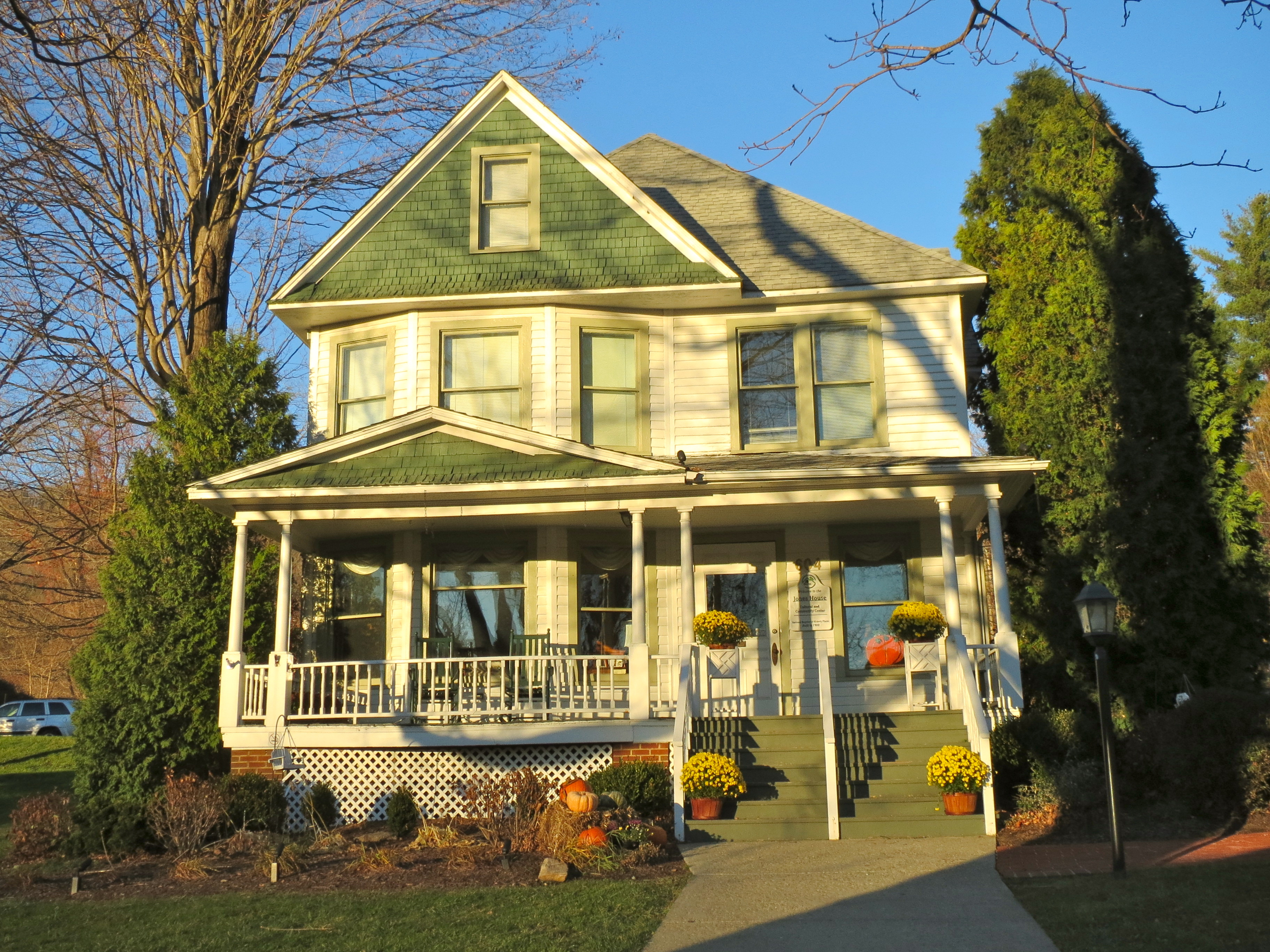
- Jones House, November 2014

- Location within North Carolina Location within the United States
- Location: 124 E. King St., Boone, North Carolina
- Coordinates: 36°13′6″N 81°41′0″W
- Area: 1.2 acres (0.49 ha)
- Built: 1908
- Architectural style: Colonial Revival, Queen Anne
- NRHP reference No.: 87000483
- Added to NRHP: March 25, 1987

Jones House is a historic home located at Boone, Watauga County, North Carolina. It was built in 1908, and is a 2 1/2-story, cubic, Colonial Revival / Queen Anne style frame dwelling. It has a two-story rear extension and projecting bays. The front facade features a hipped roof single-story porch.

It was listed on the National Register of Historic Places in 1987.
