= United States Post Office (Boone, North Carolina) =

Historic building in Boone, North Carolina, USA

- US Post Office-Boone
- U.S. National Register of Historic Places
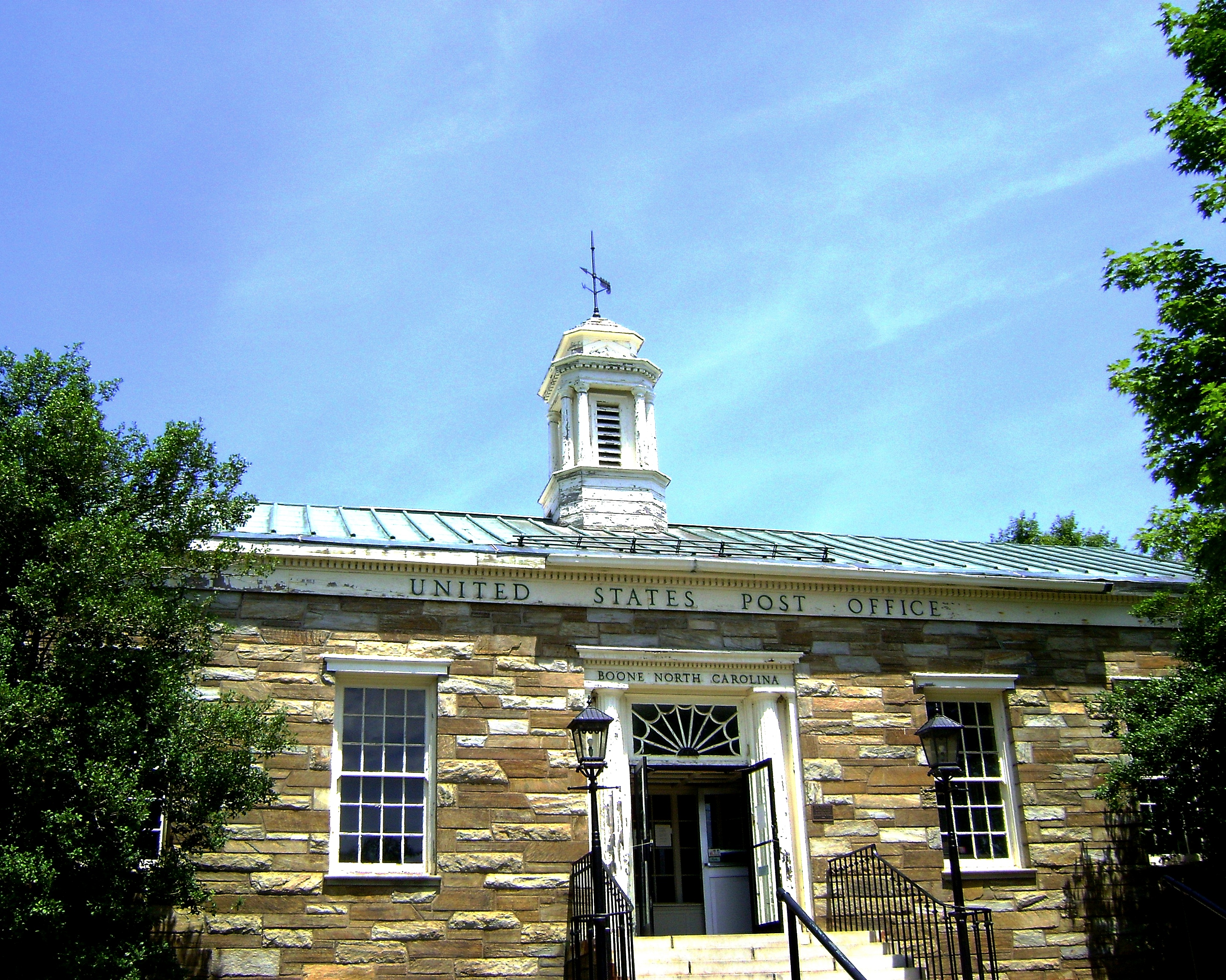
- US Post Office Boone, July 2010

- Location within North Carolina Location within the United States
- Location: 679 W. King St., Boone, North Carolina
- Coordinates: 36°13′11″N 81°41′10″W
- Area: less than one acre
- Built: 1938
- Architect: Simon, Louis A.
- Architectural style: Colonial Revival
- NRHP reference No.: 95001521
- Added to NRHP: January 11, 1996

US Post Office-Boone is a historic post office building located at Boone, Watauga County, North Carolina. It was designed by the Office of the Supervising Architect under Louis A. Simon and built in 1938. The post office was built by the Works Progress Administration as a part of the New Deal. It is a steel framed stone building on a raised native stone foundation in the Colonial Revival style. It consists of a five bay by two bay main block with a three bay service block. The building features Doric order pilasters at the entry and an octagonal lantern on the roof ridge with paired Tuscan order columns.

It was listed on the National Register of Historic Places in 1996.

The U.S. Postal Service began taking steps toward selling the Boone Post Office in 2008. As the Postal Service was going through the clearance process to sell a historic building from the North Carolina State Preservation Office, Boone locals gathered to stop the sale and acquisition by a Colorado Asset Management company. The Town of Boone purchased the Boone Post Office from the Postal Service in 2009 for $1.25 million, with a 20 year lease. The Town of Boone continued to renovate the property up until 2013, removing lead paint and asbestos and keeping the original native stone safe.

== New Deal Artwork ==
The lobby features a federally commissioned mural, Daniel Boone on a Hunting Trip in Watauga County. The mural was made by Alan Tompkins in 1939-40. The mural was funded by the Section of Fine of Arts of the U.S. Treasury Department, which was a New Deal agency that sponsored public art installation in post offices across the country. Tompkin's mural was designed to reflect the cultural heritage of the regional Appalachian community.
