= Wind power in North Carolina =

Electricity from wind in one U.S. state

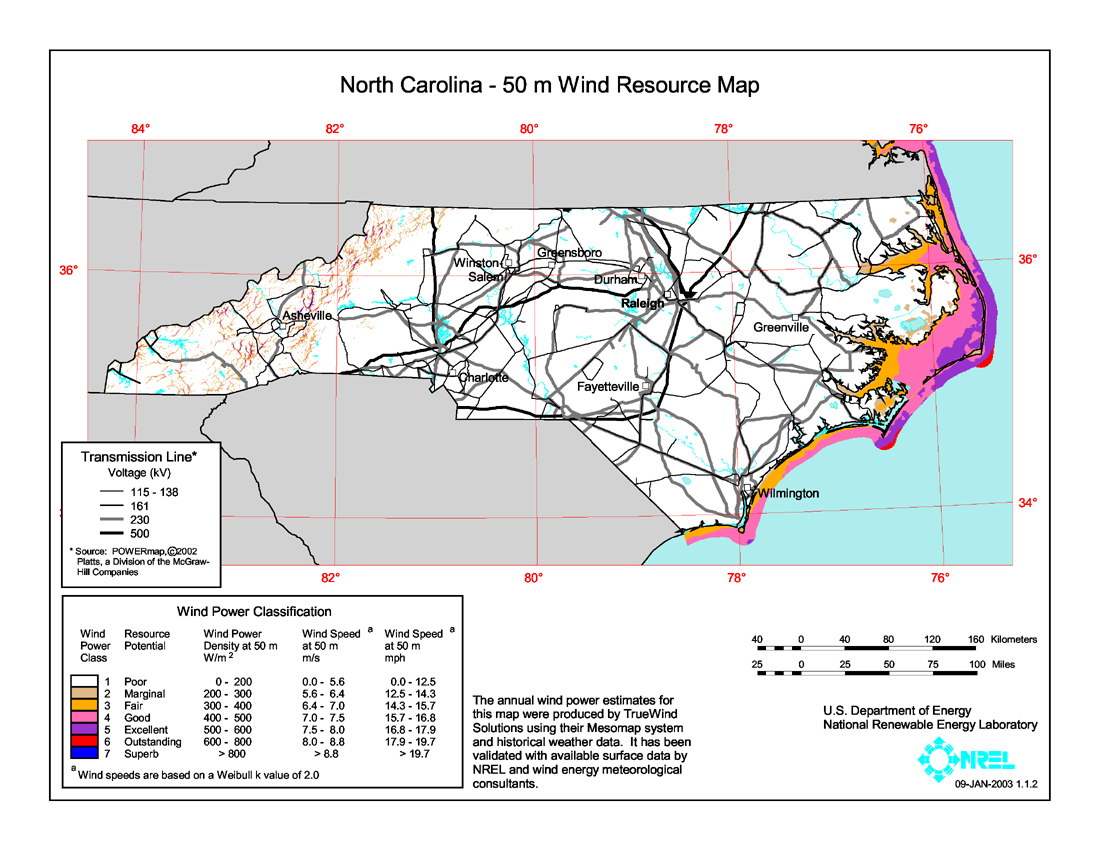
2003 US Department of Energy wind resource map of North Carolina

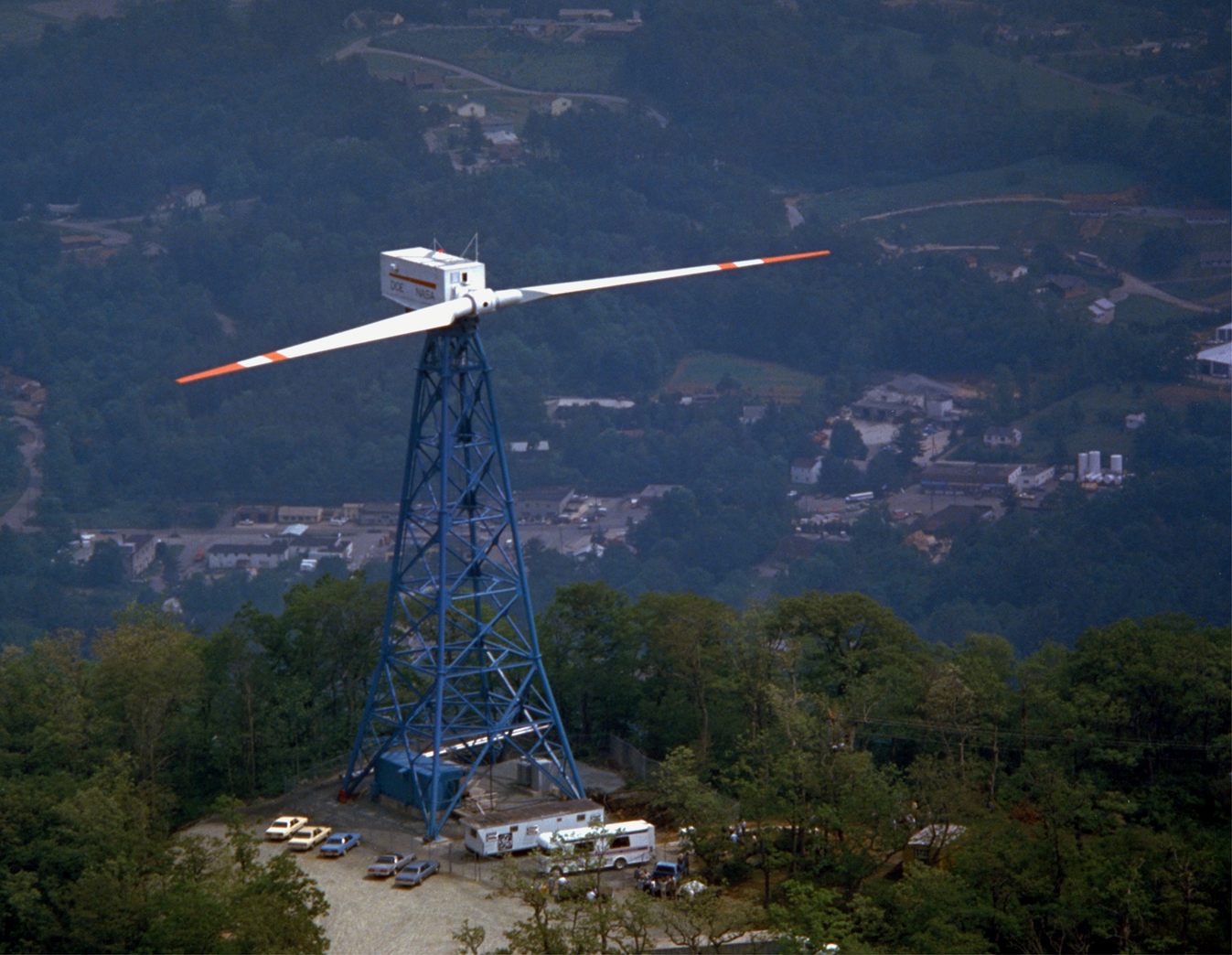
Experimental NASA wind turbine on Howard's Knob in Boone (1978–1983)

Wind power in North Carolina is found along the coastal areas in the east and mountain regions in the western part of the state. The state has significant offshore wind resources. In 2015, small-scale wind turbine projects were found throughout the state. In 2016, North Carolina's first large scale wind project, and the first in the southeastern U.S., was completed near Elizabeth City.

In 2019, North Carolina had an installed wind capacity of 208 MW.

== NASA wind turbine ==
Following its 1997 selection by the Federal Energy Research and Development Administration and the Department of Energy, the Howard Knob site was developed with an experimental General Electric wind turbine commissioned in October 1978. Concurrently with the surge in renewable energy research under the Carter administration, the MOD-1 project managed by NASA and operated by Blue Ridge Electric Membership Corporation was established as part of the federal energy initiative. It stood 131 feet (40 m) tall and had two 97-foot (30 m) long steel blades that rotated counterclockwise at 35 miles per hour (56 km/h). It was designed to power 300 to 500 average-sized homes, given wind speeds of 25 miles per hour (40 km/h).

== Permitting of Wind Energy Facilities ==
The Permitting of Wind Energy Facilities law, enacted in 2013, requires the state Department of Environment and Natural Resources to issue permits before wind energy operations may commence. This framework assists developers by identifying suitable locations and outlining the necessary steps in the permitting process.

== Land-based ==
=== Wind for Schools ===
Sponsored by the Department of Energy, the Wind for Schools program has installed small scale wind turbines for educational use at schools throughout state to encourages the incorporation of renewable energy education into the K-12 science curriculum. Appalachian State installed four turbines in 2011 at schools in the mountains including Alleghany High, Avery High, Watauga High, & North Wilkes Middle. Five turbines were installed on the coast at JP Knapp, Cape Hatteras Secondary School, First Flight High School, as well at the College of The Albemarle at Dare and at Edenton. Progress Energy Carolinas sponsored the 2-kilowatt wind turbine at Hot Springs Elementary School, another at Madison High School, and a third at the Madison County Cooperative Extension Office.

=== Amazon Wind Farm East ===
The Desert Wind Wind Energy Project proposed by Atlantic Wind was completed in 2016. The project comprises 104 wind turbines (208 MW) within a 2,513-acre portion of a 24,242-acre review area located 7.5 miles west of Elizabeth City.

== Off-shore ==
=== Capacity ===
In 2009, on behalf of the North Carolina General Assembly the University of North Carolina at Chapel Hill conducted a 9-month study to assess the feasibility of installing wind turbines in the sounds and off the coast of North Carolina. In June 2010, the National Renewable Energy Laboratory found that North Carolina had the largest resource potential of any state on the East Coast, with 297 GW of offshore wind capacity within 50 miles of the coast.

=== Offshore Wind Energy Areas ===
In 2014, the U.S. Bureau of Ocean Energy Management (BOEM) defined three offshore wind energy areas (WEA), totaling approximately 307,590 acres (1,244.8 km^{2}), for potential commercial wind energy development. They are Kitty Hawk Wind Energy Areas (122,405 acres (495.36 km^{2})), the Wilmington West Wind Energy Areas (51,595 acres (208.80 km^{2})) and the Wilmington East Wind Energy Areas (133,590 acres (540.6 km^{2})).

BOEM wind energy lease area	WEA	Leaseholder/developer/utility	Capacity (MW)	Turbines	Approvals	Refs
Outer Continental Shelf; OCS-A 0508	Kitty Hawk WEA:122,405 acres (49,536 ha) 24 nm from shore and extends approximately 25.7 nm in a general southeast direction. Its seaward extent ranges from 13.5 nm in the north to .6 nm in the south. Wilmington West WEA:51,595 acres (20,880 ha) 10 nm from shore and extends approximately 12.3 nm in an east-west direction at its widest point. Wilmington East WEA-133,590 acres (54,060 ha) 15 nm from Bald Head Island at its closest point and extends approximately 18 nm in the southeast direction at its widest point.	Avangrid				

=== Additional wind studies ===
In 2015, the University of North Carolina (UNC) at Chapel Hill planned to deploy two large buoys 20 miles (32 km) offshore, and 40 miles (64 km) north and southwest from Cape Hatteras, to capture wind, temperature and barometric pressure data for ongoing research on offshore wind energy.

== Wind generation ==
North Carolina wind generation (GWh, million kWh)
Year	Total	Jan	Feb	Mar	Apr	May	Jun	Jul	Aug	Sep	Oct	Nov	Dec
2016	6												6
2017	469	25	43	53	57	49	35	28	25	40	38	28	48
2018	542	58	56	67	64	44	22	30	24	28	42	57	50
2019	523	54	47	58	57	40	38	27	23	29	42	51	57
2020	545	61	55	63	64	55	42	24	22	33	32	39	55
2021	505	46	57	60	51	40	28	30	17	30	44	56	46
2022	117	64	53										

== See also ==
- Solar power in North Carolina
- List of wind farms in the United States
- List of offshore wind farms in the United States
