= Boone Mall =

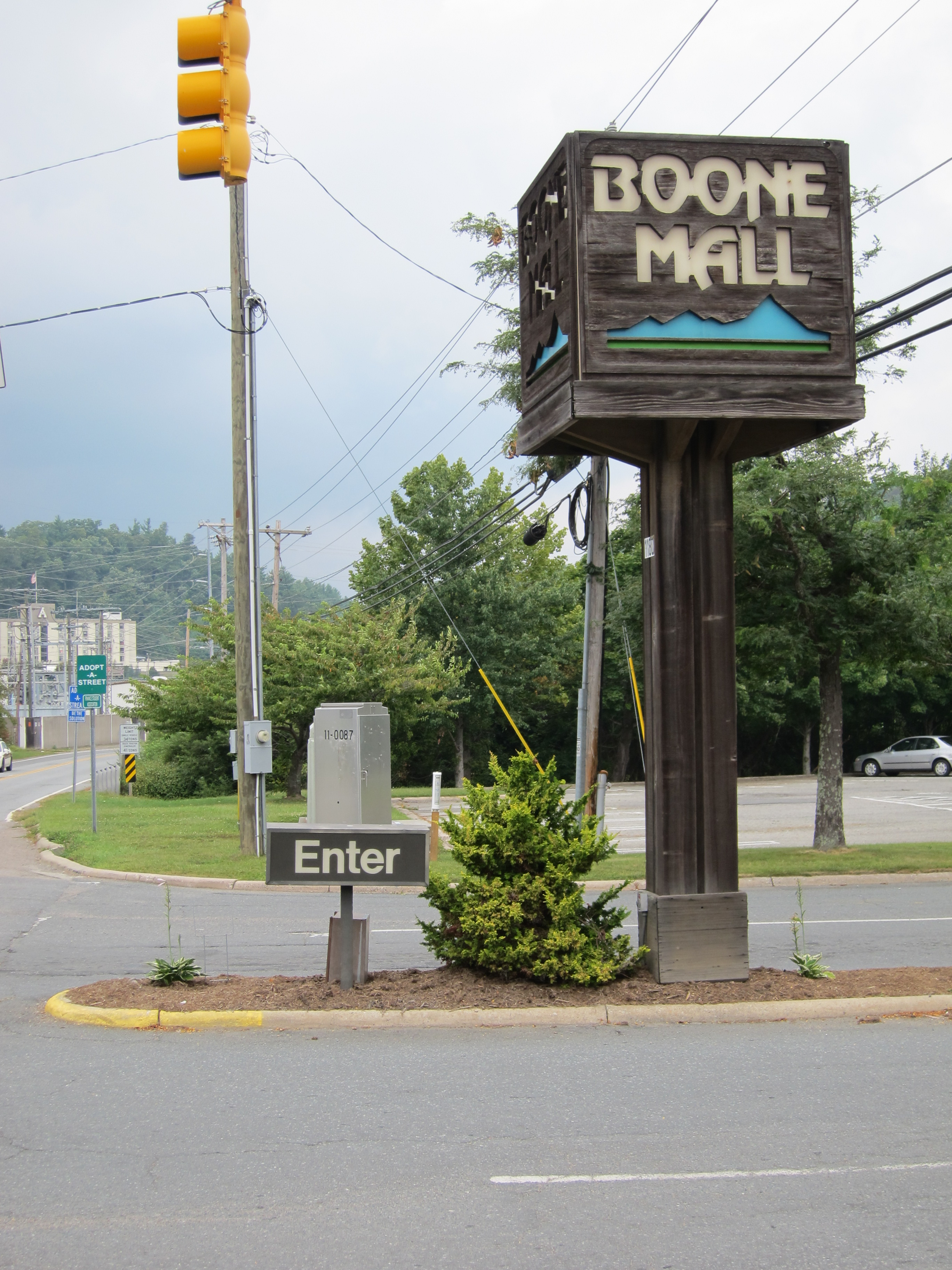
- The original Boone Mall sign, located along Winklers Creek Road
- Location: Boone, North Carolina, United States
- Opened: March 18, 1981
- Developer: William Barnett
- Owner: H.L Libby Corp
- Num. of anchor tenants: 4 (2 junior anchors)
- Floor area: 200,000 sq ft (19,000 m^{2})
- Floors: 1
- Website: boonencmall.com

Boone Mall is a regional shopping mall located in Watauga County, North Carolina. The mall's main anchor stores are Belk and Hobby Lobby, with junior anchors being TJ Maxx and HomeGoods.

== History ==
Boone Mall opened on March 18, 1981, with a ribbon cutting ceremony. The mall was developed by William Barnett of Barnett Real Properties Inc., based in Henderson, North Carolina. With roughly 200,000 square feet of retail space, Boone Mall opened with 25 stores, with space for 40 total. Anchor stores were JCPenney and Belk. Construction costs were $2.5 million, and the mall would create approximately 500 jobs in the region.

The mall's original developer, Barnett Real Properties Inc, sold the mall on June 14, 2005, for an undisclosed amount. The buyer, H.L Libby Corp, planned to renovate the property.

In 2006, the malls first major renovation would take place. Old Navy was being added to the mall as a "third anchor", however, the Old Navy occupied a space carved out of mall space rather one of the main or junior anchor spots. The front entrance to the mall was being overhauled during this time, and subsequently closed. Mall management was worried about shoppers realizing the mall was still open during the renovations. Shoppers could enter through the JCPenney or through the rear entrance. Panera Bread was also added to the mall during this time, as well as other tenants announced later. The mall is stated to have had 34 stores during this period. The center court sunken fountain, as well as several brick planter fixtures would be removed. The goal was to make the mall one level surface so that adding kiosks or hosting events would be easier.

Belk Home Goods, located on the same side of the mall at TJ Maxx, closed in 2017, consolidating back into the main Belk space. This space, and a vacant space last occupied by Dollar General, were swiftly combined to make way for a HomeGoods, which would open on August 20, 2017.

As part of a plan to close 138 stores, JCPenney would close its doors on July 31, 2017.

Sears hometown, which was located next to TJMaxx at the back of the mall, would close its doors on July 1, 2018.

Hobby Lobby would come to the mall in late 2018, taking over the former JCPenney space, as well as interior space that formerly housed RadioShack, Maurices, GeGe Uniform's, half of the old South Store, the common area between these stores and the old management and maintenance area. The store officially opened on December 31, 2018, and would not have interior mall access.

On September 2, 2022, Ulta Beauty came to the mall replacing Old Navy's former space.

== Mall explosion ==
Shortly after the mall opened, on the evening of July 20, 1981, an explosion occurred at the mall. The source of the explosion was the Italian Village Restaurant. The owner of the store, Mike Hakaj, was arrested on $100,000 bond. The explosion damaged several stores including Hakaj's Italian Restaurant, Kinney's Shoes, the Lettuce Leaf salad bar and one unoccupied store. Nobody was hurt in the explosion.

A state arson expert found that the source of the explosion was a flammable vapor combined with air, which caused $400,000 worth of damage.

In total, 3 arrests were made as a result of the police investigation. Hakaj was arrested 7 hours after the explosion. The Police connected a wallet found in the rubble to Gjoni Bardh, a name tied to other criminal investigations. Bardh was found in a hospital in the Bronx, New York, with severe burns. He was charged with arson on July 30, however the warrant wasn't served due to New York authorities holding him on a prior charge. A third person, Christine Louise Altice, was charged as an accomplice. She allegedly drove Bardh to Richlands Virginia, then to the hospital in The Bronx, New York. Mike Hakaj was found innocent by a jury in November 1981. Gjoni Bardh and Christine Altice were never tried. Bardh was serving a previous sentence, and Altice got let off for testifying against Bardh.

Mike Hakaj would sue a Charlotte insurance company for $700,000 due to failure to payout for the explosion. The insurance company countered by stating that due to the fire being "started by one of its owners", they can't pay out.

== Flooding ==
Before the mall was even built, concerns arose from citizens about the use of said land for retail. The land the mall was eventually built on is between Hodges and Winkler's creek respectively. People were concerned that the mall's big parking lot would divert water that would normally stand in the field into the creeks flooding areas downstream. Despite these concerns, developer Barnett Real Properties Inc would later build their mall at this location.

On August 26, 1992, many areas of Boone would experience flash flooding, including the Boone Mall. A man became trapped in his station wagon when 3 to 4 feet of water engulfed his vehicle in the mall parking lot. He was rescued via boat by being pulled out through his car window.
