= John Smith Miller House =

Historic house in North Carolina, United States

- U.S. National Register of Historic Places
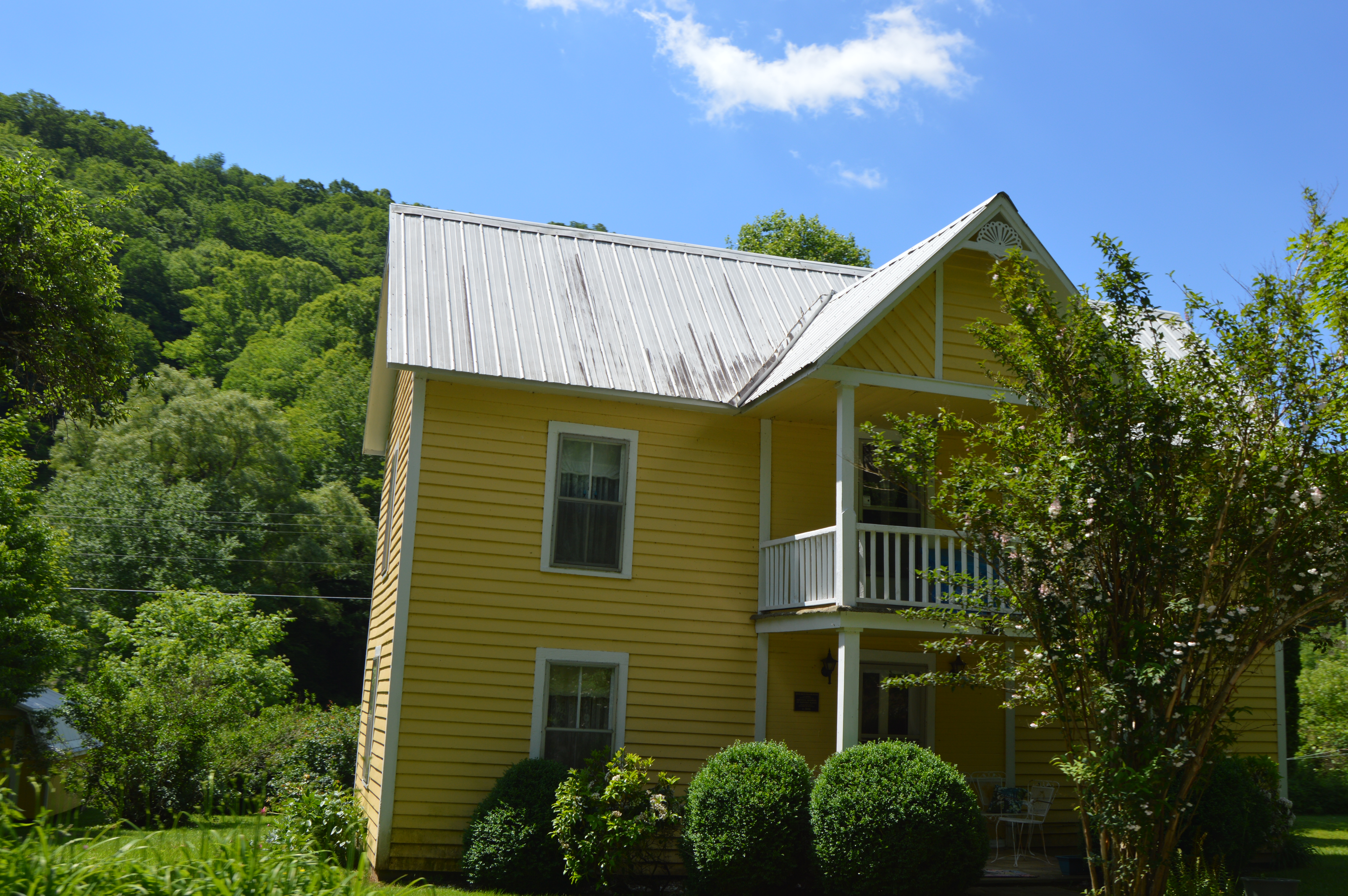
- Facade

- Location within North Carolina Location within the United States
- Location: 561 Chestnut Grove Rd., near Boone, North Carolina
- Coordinates: 36°15′59″N 81°39′48.5″W
- Area: 6.5 acres (2.6 ha)
- Built: 1906
- Architect: John Smith Miller
- Architectural style: I-house
- NRHP reference No.: 08001389
- Added to NRHP: January 29, 2009

John Smith Miller House is a historic home located near Boone, Watauga County, North Carolina. It was built in 1906, and is a two-story, side gable, "L"-plan, chestnut frame I-house. It has a one-story rear ell with side porch. The front facade features a central gabled two-tier porch.

It was listed on the National Register of Historic Places in 2009.
