= Desert Wind Farm =

Wind farm in North Carolina, US

- Country: United States
- Location: Perquimans and Pasquotank County near Elizabeth City, North Carolina
- Coordinates: 36°18′36″N 76°25′12″W
- Status: Operational
- Construction began: July 2015
- Commission date: February 2017
- Construction cost: $400 million
- Owner: Iberdrola Renewables
- Operator: Avangrid Renewables

Wind farm
- Type: Onshore

Power generation
- Units operational: 104 turbines
- Make and model: Gamesa G114 2.0 MW
- Nameplate capacity: 208 MW
- Capacity factor: 29.1% (average 2018-2021)
- Annual net output: 529 GW·h

The Desert Wind Farm, also known as Amazon Wind Farm US East, spans Perquimans and Pasquotank County on the Atlantic coastal plain in northeast North Carolina. With a total generating capacity of 208 megawatts (MW), it became the first large wind farm in the southeast United States when it came online at the end of 2016. All of the electricity is contracted to Amazon to power its growing data centers in Virginia and the region.

== Facility details ==
The project was developed starting in about 2006 by Atlantic Wind, a U.S. subsidiary of the Spanish company Iberdrola Renewables to occupy a region of coastal farmland locally known as "the desert" near the Albemarle Sound port of Elizabeth City. Initially planned for a total capacity of 300 MW, the contract with Amazon enabled financing of a first phase of construction to begin on over 22,000 acres in the summer of 2015.

Wanzek Construction, a subsidiary of Mastec provided EPC services. The 18-month construction project employed more than 500 people in cooperation with about 60 landowners. The wind turbines were manufactured by Gamesa, each with a hub height of 92 meters and rotor diameter of 114 meters capable of generating up to 2.0 MW of electrical power.

The completed facility consists of 104 turbines and their foundations, underground collection lines, electrical substation, maintenance building, access roads, and accompanying stormwater system. It is operated and maintained by Avangrid Renewables and permanently employs about 10-15 people. It is projected to produce about 670 GW·h of electricity annually, corresponding to a capacity factor in excess of 35%.

A legal challenge to impose the newer (2013) state regulations on the project was pursued during its construction and was dismissed. Interference of the facility with ROTHR and other military and surveillance operations along the east coast have thus far been determined to be acceptable. Criticism of the facility's performance and economics, and concerns regarding possible impacts of future similar projects, have persisted following the start of operations.

== Electricity production ==
Desert Wind Electricity Generation (MW·h)
Year	Total Annual MW·h
2016	6,233*
2017	470,743*
2018	542,772
2019	523,139
2020	546,267
2021	505,164
Average (years 2018-2021) --->	529,336

(*) partial year of operation

== See also ==
- Wind power in North Carolina
- Environmental impact of wind power
- List of wind farms in the United States
