= Wine to Water =

Wine To Water
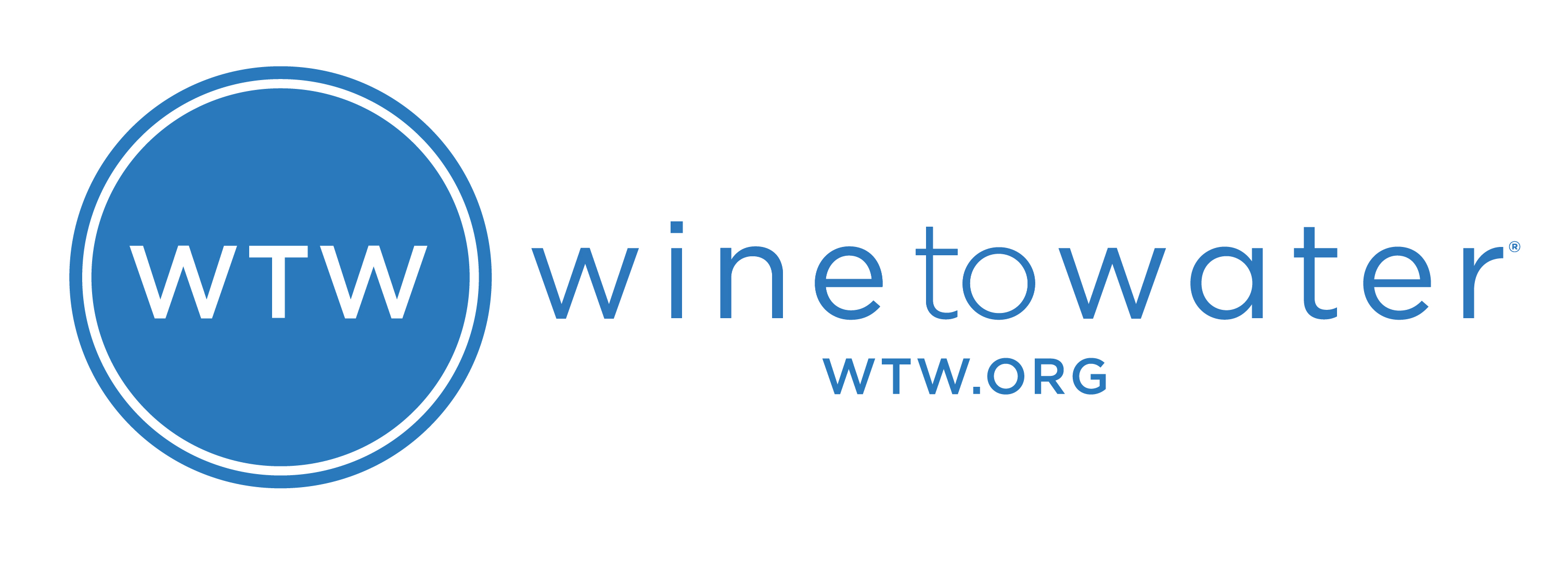
- Company type: Non-profit organization
- Founded: 2004
- Founder: Doc Hendley
- Headquarters: Boone, North Carolina
- Number of locations: Domestic and International
- Area served: Colombia, Dominican Republic, Nepal, Tanzania
- Services: Clean water distribution and sanitation training
- Number of employees: 20 full-time domestic, 20 full-time international, dozens of volunteers and international aid organizations
- Website: wtw.org

Wine To Water is a non-profit organization concerned with clean water distribution and sanitation training. The organization was founded by Doc Hendley in 2007.

== History ==
The idea for Wine To Water was born with the first fundraiser being held in Raleigh, North Carolina in early 2004. The founder, Doc Hendley was a bartender in Raleigh, and had a strong desire utilize the bar and nightclub industry as a way to bring about positive change in the world. After becoming aware of the world's water crisis, Hendley held fundraisers at wine tastings and bars in the Raleigh area. The funds from the events would be used to implement clean water projects around the world. The projects financed include digging and repairing wells, supplying areas with filtration systems and storage containers, and educating locals on how to maintain fresh water supplies.

Nearly one billion people worldwide lack access to clean water, and roughly 3.5 million people die each year because of water related issues. Almost half of these deaths are attributed to diarrhea. Wine To Water has expanded greatly recently, and is currently working on water projects in Sudan, India, Cambodia, Uganda, Ethiopia, Peru, and Kenya.

Wine To Water is based in Boone, North Carolina, and has clean water projects running in multiple international locations. Wine To Water has received a great deal of media attention on the local, national, and international levels. Doc Hendley was selected by CNN as a top ten finalist for the 2012 CNN Heroes. As of 2009, Wine To Water had implemented sustainable drinking water initiatives to over 25,000 individuals. By October 2014, Wine To Water had expanding to include projects in 18 countries on four continents, supplying clean water to over 300,000 individuals.

== Projects ==
Well being dug in Trujillo, Peru

=== Sudan ===
Wine To Water’s work in Sudan includes on rehabilitating wells, delivering water to war-torn regions, and installing a water system they constructed for an orphanage located in the capital. Hendley and his organization have provided relief for locations in the Sudan that have been deemed unsafe for humanitarian work.

=== India ===
A leper colony located on the outskirts of New Delhi lacked access to clean water. WTW has installed a new running water system for this colony.

=== Cambodia ===
Cambodia is a country surrounded by water, yet most of the citizens lack access to clean water. Roughly 3/4 of the deaths in Cambodia can be attributed to a lack of clean water. One focus of Wine To Water in Phnom Penh, is to supply Bio Sand filters for the residences and communities that do not have access to clean water. The primary focus, however, is the drilling of new water wells for communities. As of October, 2009, WTW has drilled over 70 wells for the people of Cambodia. Using local supplies and hand pumps, WTW is able to cut the cost of drilling a well to one fifth the original cost.

=== Uganda ===
Work in Uganda is focused on several areas: first is the distribution of Bio-Sand filters, second is the training of local persons to manufacture their own filters, lastly the formation of training centers around the country to educate the citizens about how to clean water and the importance of this process.

Hendley (right) checking out a water tank placed on a roof in Peru

=== Peru ===
Wine To Water's work in Peru is currently centered in Trujillo. Water projects underway as of 2009 include hand digging wells, as well as supplying households, orphanages and daycares with a water pumping and storage system to ensure clean water for the community. Individual filtration systems are being distributed in additional areas exposed to contaminated water sources.

=== Haiti ===
In response to the 2010 Haiti earthquake, Wine To Water responded by partnering with Filter Pure to distribute 500 ceramic water filters. The filters provide clean water for a family of 10 for up to five years. Along with Filter Pure, Wine To Water has also begun to build a Haitian run ceramic filter factory to ensure clean water will continue to get to those who need it most.
