= Doc Hendley =

American author, speaker and philanthropist

Dickson Beattie "Doc" Hendley
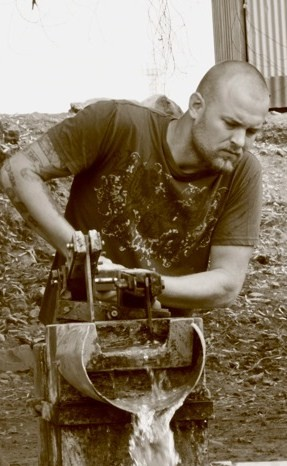
- Hendley pumping water from a well in Trujillo, Peru, 2009
- Born: Dickson Beattie Hendley; March 19, 1979 (age 47); Augusta, Georgia, U.S.
- Other name: Doc
- Occupations: Author, Speaker, Philanthropist
- Known for: Wine to Water
- Spouse: Amber Hendley
- Children: 3

Dickson Beattie "Doc" Hendley (born March 19, 1979) is the founder of Wine to Water, an American charitable organization devoted to providing clean water and sanitation to people around the world.

== Wine to Water ==
Hendley is the founder and current president of Wine to Water, a 501 (c)(3) non-profit aid organization focused on providing clean water to needy people around the world. Wine to Water has worked in Sudan, India, Cambodia, Uganda, Ethiopia, Peru, South Africa, and Kenya. The organization responded to the 2010 Haiti earthquake by bringing a water purification system to be implemented within disaster areas.

Hendley first envisioned the concept of Wine to Water in 2003 while bartending and playing music in nightclubs around Raleigh, North Carolina. In January 2004, the first fundraiser was held at a local bar in Raleigh. With the money raised during the event, Hendley traveled to Darfur, Sudan, and began installing water systems for victims of government-supported genocide. He then lived in Sudan for about a year. Upon his return to the United States, he began to focus his energy on developing Wine to Water programs in other countries and received local and national media attention as a result.

== CNN Heroes Selection ==
In May 2009, Hendley was selected as one of the CNN Heroes of the 2009 year out of nearly 9,000 submissions. In October 2009, a panel of judges — including Gen. Colin Powell, Whoopi Goldberg, Ted Turner, and Elton John — announced that Hendley was a "Top 10 Finalist for CNN’s Hero of Year."

In 2009, Wine to Water had implemented sustainable drinking water initiatives in half a dozen countries and over 25,000 individuals, by 2014 those numbers have rocketed to 18 countries and over 300,000 people.

== Book ==
Hendley published his first book in 2012 titled "Wine to Water; A Bartender's Quest to Bring Clean Water to the World." The book has received very positive reviews, and has been picked up by several universities as required reading. The book was left a little "open ended" so a follow-up is expected.

The following quote was taken from the book jacket:

Whether he is describing being shot at by the Janjaweed militia or children's excitement when a well starts pumping out water, he illuminates the facts of the crisis in a very human way. Hendley's humanitarian work is inspiring. --Publishers Weekly
