= The Blue Rags =

American ragtime and boogie-woogie band

The Blue Rags are an American revivalist, ragtime and boogie-woogie band from Asheville, North Carolina, United States. The band released two albums on the trendsetting Sub Pop label - 1997's Rag-N-Roll and 1999's Eat at Joe’s - and toured extensively in the late 1990s. The band's sound, sometimes described as “punk ragtime”, was an early influence on artists such as The Avett Brothers and Old Crow Medicine Show.

== History ==
Pianist Jake Hollifield and guitarist Scott Sharpe formed the band in 1990 in Statesville, North Carolina, where they both attended community college. Sharpe introduced ragtime music to Hollifield, who later remarked, “I liked it better than Snoop Doggy Dogg”. Guitarist Aaron “Woody” Wood, bassist Bill Reynolds, drummer Mike Rhodes, and harmonica player Abe Reid would later join the group.

The band signed to Sub Pop, which released Rag-N-Roll in 1997. Recorded in a single day, the debut album was a blend of original songs and spirited covers of Professor Longhair, Lead Belly, and Gershwin tunes. The album was met with critical acclaim, and Allmusic praised the album as “uncommonly genuine, like serious musicians having the drunken time of their lives”. Comparisons with fellow North Carolinians Squirrel Nut Zippers followed, though the Rags were quick to point out differences between the two bands’ styles, live shows, and influences. Plus, as drummer Mike Rhodes once noted, “Swing dancers hate us, because we play too fast".

The band's second album, Eat at Joe’s, was recorded in New York with producer Joe Blaney and released in 1999. It consisted almost entirely of band originals and garnered some positive reviews, with CMJ calling it, "Pure retro fun without a trace of irony".

By September 1999, the band had parted ways with Sub Pop. In an interview with Asheville's Mountain Xpress, Hollifield expressed his frustration with the band's record label experience. The group informally disbanded in 2000. A third album was recorded around this time, but untimely record label mergers put its release in limbo.

In the years since, the band has staged occasional reunion shows in the Asheville area. The band members have all moved on to various musical projects, including Bill Reynolds, who is currently the bassist for Band of Horses.

== Discography ==
- Rag-N-Roll (Sub Pop 1997)
- Eat at Joe's (Sub Pop 1999)
