= Howard Knob =

Mountain in North Carolina, United States

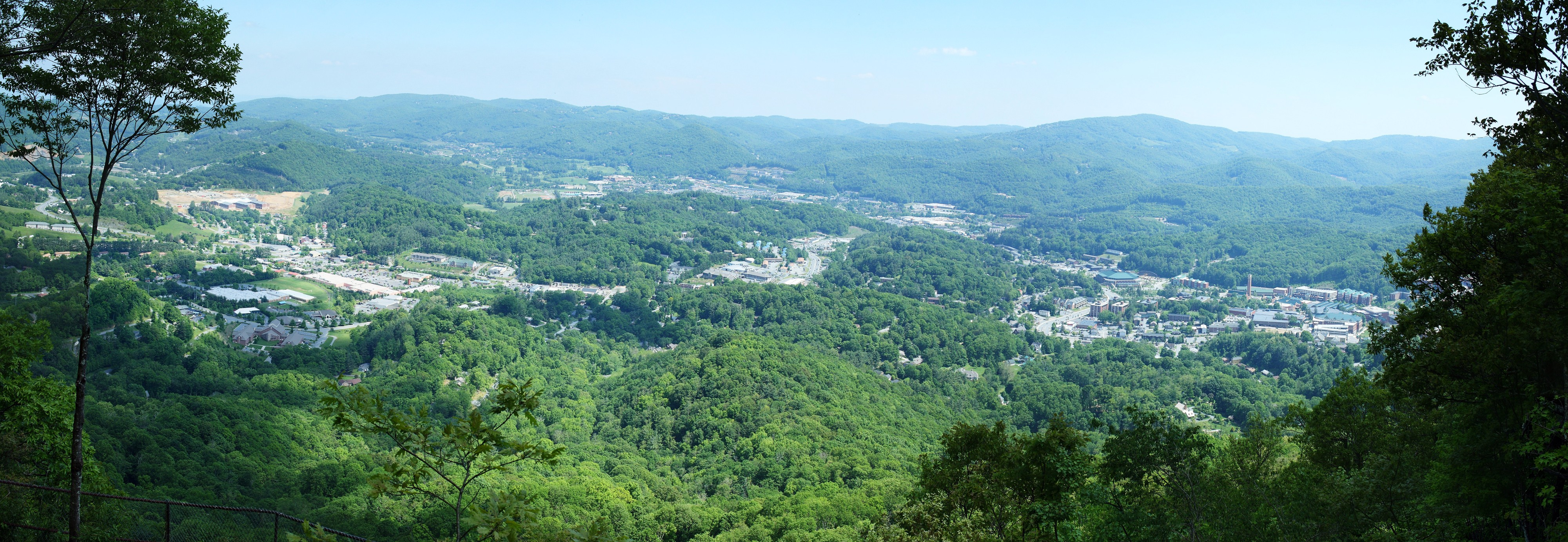
- View from Howard Knob

Highest point
- Elevation: 4,396 ft (1,340 m)
- Coordinates: 36°13′51″N 81°40′34″W

Geography
- Location within North Carolina
- Location: Watauga County, North Carolina, U.S.
- Parent range: Blue Ridge Mountains
- Topo map: USGS Boone

Howard Knob (variant: Howard's Knob) is a mountain in the North Carolina High Country, located in the town of Boone. According to the US Geological Survey, the mountain's proper name is Howard Knob, but it is known to locals and tourists as Howard's Knob. Howard Knob and the surrounding area are part of the Appalachian Mountain Range. The mountain has an elevation of 4,396 feet (1,340 m) above sea level, and rises nearly 1,000 feet (300 m) above the town of Boone and the campus of Appalachian State University.

== History ==
Howard Knob was named after Benjamin Howard, a British loyalist, contemporary of Daniel Boone, and early settler of the area. According to local legend, Howard hid from Whigs on the knoll which was to be named after him.

In 1977, the Federal Energy Research and Development Administration and the Department of Energy announced that Howard Knob had been selected as the site for an experimental wind turbine, which was later built by General Electric in October 1978. The project was part of a surge in renewable energy research which began under then-President Jimmy Carter. The turbine, formally known as MOD-1, was managed by NASA and operated by Blue Ridge Electric Membership Corporation. It stood 131 feet (40 m) tall and had two 97-foot (30 m) long steel blades that rotated counterclockwise at 35 miles per hour (56 km/h). It was designed to power 300 to 500 average-sized homes, given wind speeds of 25 miles per hour (40 km/h).

An unintended consequence of the new technology was a low-frequency "swish-swish" or "wooshing" noise that irritated locals. In March and April 1980, DOE and NASA engineers determined that a two-cycle-per-second sound was generated by wind blowing through the blades. Although the sound was twenty cycles below the range of human hearing, it caused windows and other objects to vibrate audibly. A group of Appalachian State University students calling themselves "Wooshies" mocked the turbine project in a class video and gained the attention of local and regional newspapers. The turbine was also blamed for disrupting television signals. Some questioned whether it was working at all, since the blades did not seem to move very often. The turbine was dismantled in 1983.

The abandoned turbine site on Howard Knob was handed over to the county to serve as a park "in perpetuity."

Howard Knob has been at times a popular spot for bouldering, rock climbing, and hang gliding. However, those activities were discouraged and ultimately prohibited by town authorities and private property owners.

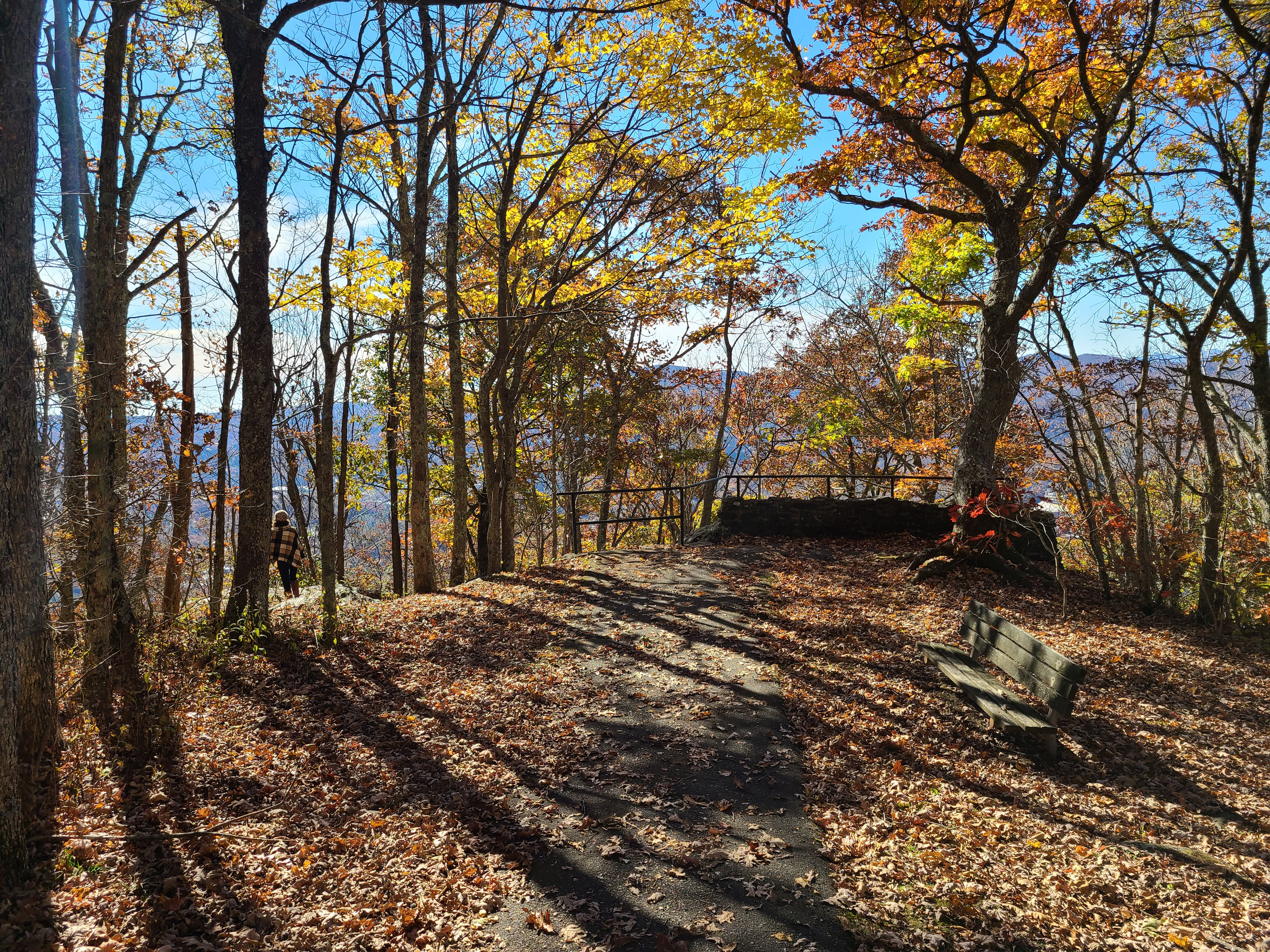
Autumnal view from Howard Knob

== Land Conservancy ==
With unparalleled views of downtown Boone and the surrounding mountains, Howard Knob has often been targeted for residential development. In December 2004, owners of a 50-acre (200,000 m^{2}) tract on Howard Knob allied with the High Country Conservancy and signed a conservation easement protecting 46 acres (190,000 m^{2}) as a forested natural area with limited provisions for hiking trails and a small shelter. Three of the owners' remaining acres were slated for 1-acre (4,000 m^{2}) residential plots near existing homes.
