= National Register of Historic Places listings in Watauga County, North Carolina =

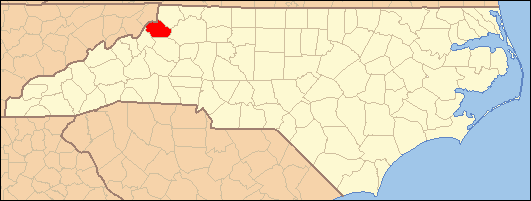

This list includes properties and districts listed on the National Register of Historic Places in Watauga County, North Carolina. Click the "Map of all coordinates" link to the right to view an online map of all properties and districts with latitude and longitude coordinates in the table below.

== Current location ==
This National Park Service list is complete through NPS recent listings posted March 14, 2025.

	Name on the Register	Image	Date listed	Location	City or town	Description
1	Blair Farm	Blair Farm	August 29, 2008 (#08000812)	N. side of NC 1522 just W. of its jct. with Blairmont Dr. 36°12′11″N 81°38′52″W	Boone	
2	Blue Ridge Parkway	Blue Ridge Parkway	December 13, 2024 (#100011353)	Blue Ridge Parkway through Virginia and North Carolina; 36°13′39″N 81°34′03″W	Boone vicinity	
3	Blue Ridge Tourist Court		April 18, 2023 (#100008846)	574, 560 Old East King St., 173, 187, 191 Cecil Miller Rd. 36°13′11″N 81°38′57″W	Boone	
4	Bollinger-Hartley House		March 9, 1995 (#95000172)	423 N. Main St. 36°08′19″N 81°40′13″W	Blowing Rock	
5	Cove Creek High School	Cove Creek High School	June 18, 1998 (#98000707)	207 Dale Adams Rd. 36°15′47″N 81°47′07″W	Sugar Grove	
6	Daniel Boone Hotel	Daniel Boone Hotel	December 27, 1982 (#82001307)	W. King St. 36°13′06″N 81°40′57″W	Boone	Demolished
7	East Tennessee & Western North Carolina Railroad Locomotive No. 12	East Tennessee & Western North Carolina Railroad Locomotive No. 12	March 12, 1992 (#92000147)	Tweetsie RR theme park, jct. of Tweetsie RR Rd. and US 321; 36°10′14″N 81°38′51″W	Blowing Rock	
8	Ben Farthing Farm		January 4, 1993 (#92001736)	NC 1121 (Rominger Rd.) W side, just N of Watauga R. 36°14′21″N 81°49′26″W	Sugar Grove	
9	Flat Top Estate	Flat Top Estate	December 24, 2013 (#13000978)	Blue Ridge Parkway, milepost 292.8 to 295.5; 36°08′53″N 81°41′36″W	Blowing Rock	
10	Former Randall Memorial Building		March 14, 1991 (#91000263)	Greenway Ct. 36°07′55″N 81°40′40″W	Blowing Rock	
11	Gragg House		October 25, 1973 (#73001382)	On U.S. 221; 36°07′00″N 81°46′39″W	Blowing Rock	
12	Green Park Historic District	Green Park Historic District	August 19, 1994 (#94001020)	Jct. of US 321 and Green Hill and Rock Rds. 36°07′17″N 81°39′38″W	Blowing Rock	
13	Green Park Inn	Green Park Inn	June 3, 1982 (#82004637)	U.S. 321; 36°07′07″N 81°39′39″W	Blowing Rock	
14	Jones House	Jones House	March 25, 1987 (#87000483)	604 W. King St. 36°13′06″N 81°41′00″W	Boone	
15	Mast Farm	Mast Farm	January 20, 1972 (#72001002)	E of Valle Crucis off SR 1112; 36°12′23″N 81°46′15″W	Valle Crucis	
16	Mast General Store	Mast General Store	April 3, 1973 (#73001383)	S of Valle Crucis on SR 1112; 36°12′28″N 81°46′48″W	Valle Crucis	
17	John Smith Miller House	John Smith Miller House	January 29, 2009 (#08001389)	561 Chestnut Grove Rd. 36°15′59″N 81°39′48″W	Boone	
18	US Post Office-Boone	US Post Office-Boone	January 11, 1996 (#95001521)	679 W. King St. 36°13′11″N 81°41′10″W	Boone	
19	Valle Crucis Episcopal Mission	Valle Crucis Episcopal Mission	September 9, 1993 (#93000938)	NC 194 N side, 1 miles SW of jct. with NC 1112; 36°11′45″N 81°47′46″W	Valle Crucis	
20	Valle Crucis Historic District	Valle Crucis Historic District	February 2, 2005 (#04001600)	Along NC 194 and NC 1112; 36°12′33″N 81°46′43″W	Valle Crucis	
21	Vardell Family Cottages Historic District	Vardell Family Cottages Historic District	March 12, 2001 (#01000254)	222 Grandfather Ave, 137, 187, 209 Chestnut Circle; 36°07′36″N 81°40′42″W	Blowing Rock	
22	Ward Family House	Ward Family House	May 23, 1997 (#97000473)	8018 Rominger Rd. 36°14′50″N 81°49′21″W	Sugar Grove	
23	Westglow	Westglow	August 13, 1979 (#79001762)	W of Blowing Rock on U.S. 221; 36°08′17″N 81°42′50″W	Blowing Rock	
24	Wilson-Vines House		December 22, 1997 (#97001562)	4300 Rush Branch Rd. 36°17′30″N 81°50′57″W	Beaver Dam	

== See also ==
- National Register of Historic Places listings in North Carolina
- List of National Historic Landmarks in North Carolina
