= Blair House (disambiguation) =

Blair House usually refers to

- Blair House, Washington, D.C.

or it may refer to (with variations including "Estate" and "Ranch"):

- Combellack-Blair House, Placerville, California, NRHP-listed
- Powell and Blair Stone Ranch, Proctor, Colorado, NRHP-listed in Logan County
- William McCormick Blair Estate, Lake Bluff, Illinois, NRHP-listed in Lake County
- Blair-Dunning House, Bloomington, Indiana, NRHP-listed
- Blair House (Washington, Iowa), NRHP-listed
- Blair Flats, St. Paul, Minnesota, NRHP-listed
- Blair Farm, Boone, North Carolina, NRHP-listed in Watauga County
- William Allen Blair House, Winston-Salem, North Carolina, NRHP-listed in Forsyth County
- Herbert S. Blair House, Bucyrus, Ohio, NRHP-listed in Crawford County
- Blair House (Montgomery, Ohio), NRHP-listed, NRHP-listed
- Sen. William Blair House, Waukesha, Wisconsin, NRHP-listed in Waukesha County
- Quintin Blair House, Cody, Wyoming, NRHP-listed
- Charles E. Blair House, Laramie, Wyoming, NRHP-listed in Albany County

== See also ==
- Blair-Rutland Building, Decatur, Georgia, NRHP-listed in DeKalb County
