= Bass Lake (Watauga County, North Carolina) =

Lake in North Carolina, U.S.

- Cone Lake (formerly)
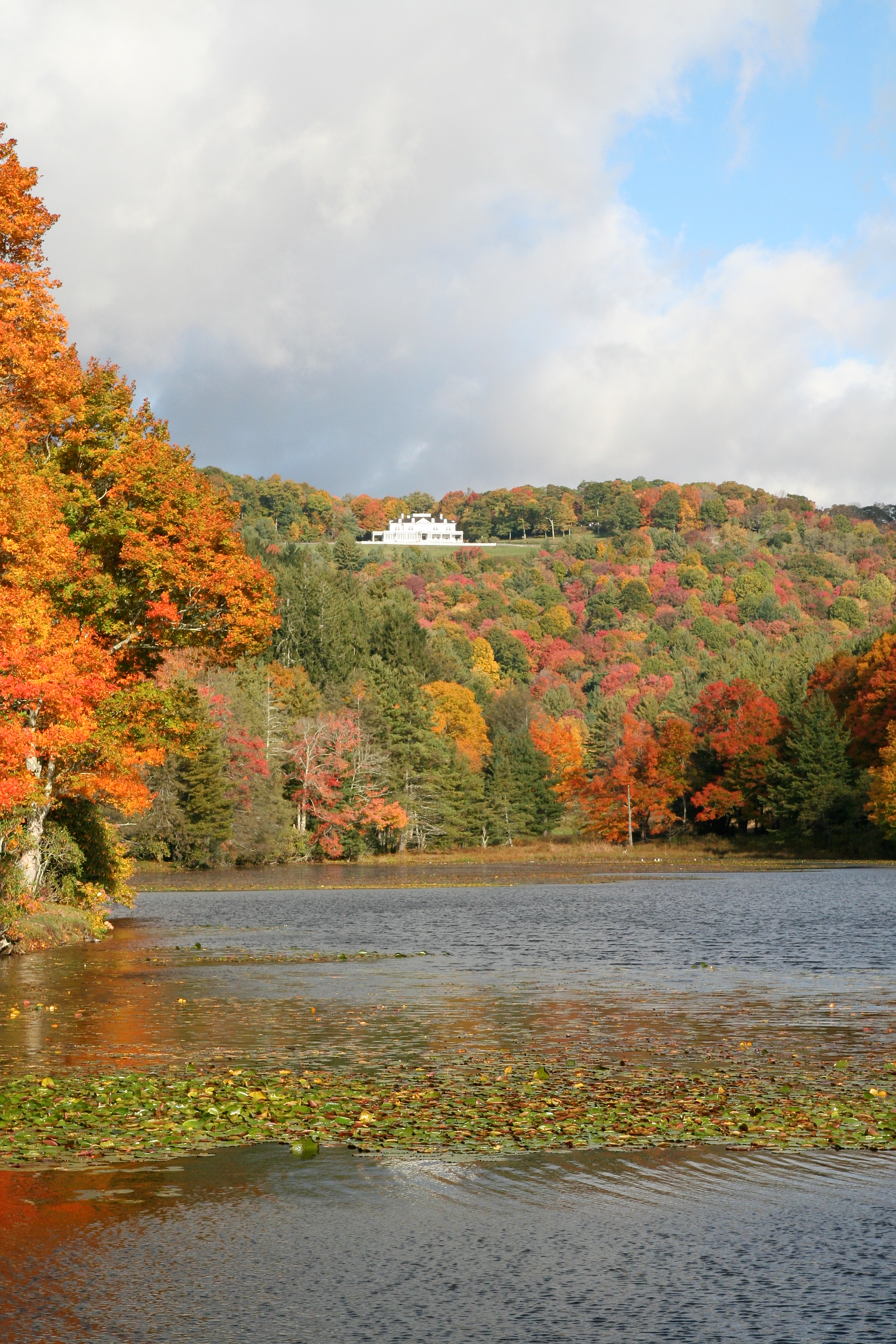
- Bass Lake, with Flat Top Manor in background

- Location in North Carolina Location in United States
- Location: Blowing Rock, Watauga County, North Carolina, U.S.
- Coordinates: 36.1414°N 81.6843°W
- Type: Lake
- Basin countries: United States
- Surface area: 22 acres (8.9 ha)
- Max. depth: 30 feet (9.1 m)
- Water volume: 380 acre-feet (470,000 m^{3})
- Surface elevation: 3,563 feet (1,086 m)

Bass Lake, also known as Cone Lake, is a 22-acre (8.9 ha) man-made lake or reservoir located in Blowing Rock, Watauga County, North Carolina, United States. The Moses H. Cone estate, also called Flat Top Manor, is on a hillside overlooking the lake, whose elevation is 3,563 feet (1,086 m). Cone constructed two lakes on the property: Trout Lake and Cone Lake. The lakes are within Moses H. Cone Memorial Park which is listed in the National Register of Historic Places.

== Description ==
Bass Lake is found in Moses H. Cone Memorial Park which was listed in the National Register of Historic Places in 2013. The lake's area is 22 acres (8.9 ha) with a maximum depth of 30 feet (9.1 m). It was previously known as Cone Lake. It was built c. 1905. The lake was named Cone, because Moses H. Cone built two lakes on his estate: Trout Lake and Cone Lake. The estate was built on a hillside overlooking Cone Lake. The lake is supplied by two perennial branches of Middle Fork of the New River. The lake is encircled by an approximately one-mile-long (1.6 km) trail open to hikers and horsebackers. The present earthen dam that forms the lake was built in 1936 and modified in 1991. The dam is 40 feet (12 m) high and impounds 380 acre-feet (470,000 m^{3}) of water. The dam, lake, and entire park are owned by the National Park Service, having received it as a donation from the Moses H. Cone Memorial Hospital, to which it was bequeathed upon the death of Cone's widow in 1947.

== History ==
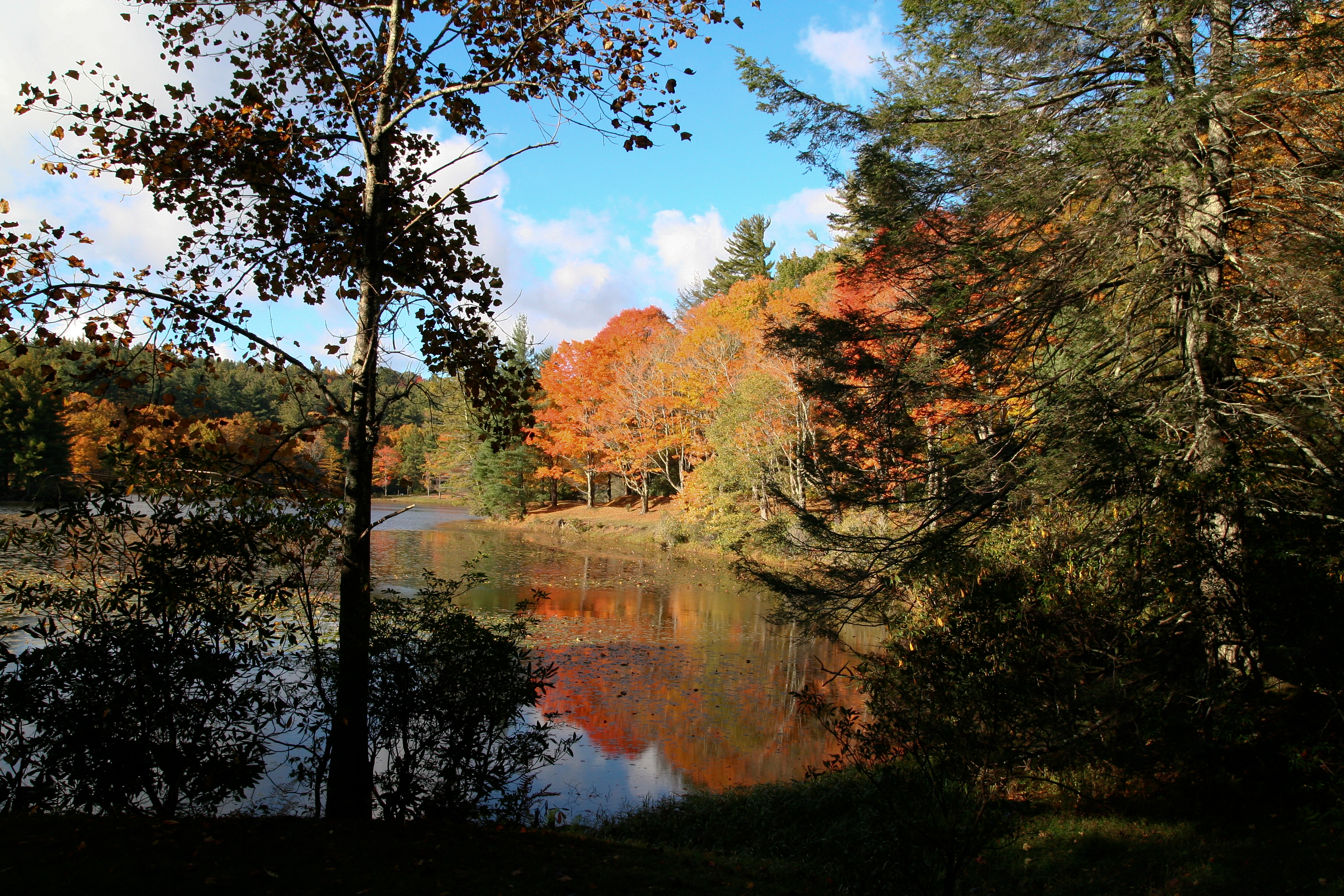
Bass Lake in 2007

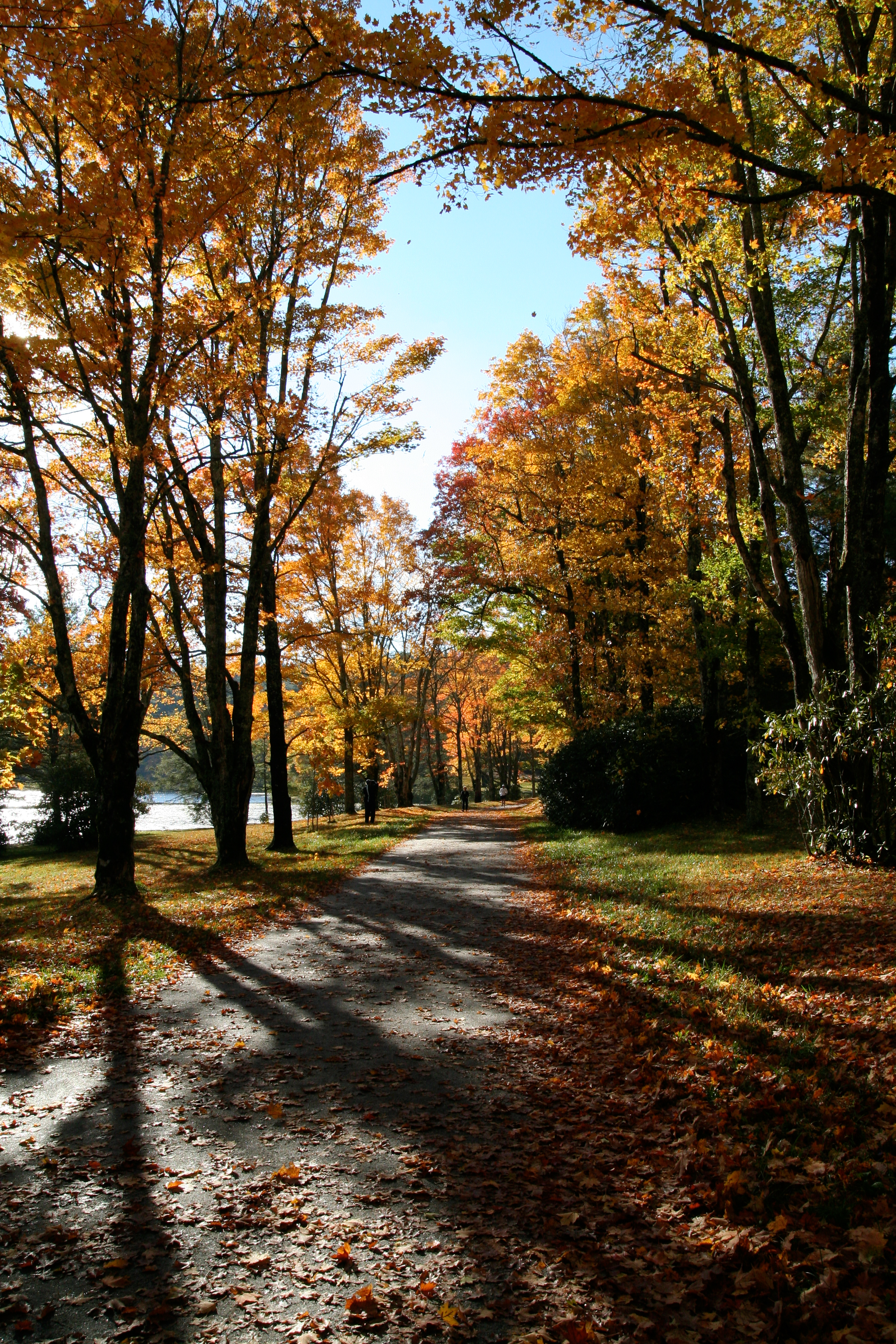
Walking path along Bass Lake

Cone specified the construction of a 500-foot (150 m) long 30-foot (9.1 m) wide earthen dam with a clay core and a dual-channeled stone-lined spillway to handle overflows. A sluice gate was included to allow the lake to be drained. A small island was built within the lake as a focal point, and water lilies, specifically Nymphaea odorata were planted along the northern end of the lake.

In 1908, the Moses H. Cone estate was referred to as Flat Top Manor in Cone's obituary. The Hickory Democrat reported that Cone was buried on the property where he had an orchard with 32,000 apple trees and two large lakes. They reported that the construction of roads, buildings and the two lakes cost Cone $US500,000. In 1914, The Lenoir News reported that the Cone estate was said to have thousands of apple trees with an estimated harvest of 50,000 bushels. The slopes near the lake were also covered with hundreds of apple trees. Cone Lake appears on the 1936 USGS Morganton Quadrangle in Watauga County.

In 1942, the lake was drained and repaired.

In 1953, the lake still carried the name Cone Lake and it was described as a 30-acre (12 ha) lake in the Charlotte Observer. In 1956 the lake had an abundance of rainbow trout and some brook trout.

The dam was damaged by an ice flow in 1986, leading to it being drained again. An inspection three years earlier by the Bureau of Reclamation had determined the dam did not meet the current federal dam safety guidelines and a major renovation was performed in 1990. The sluice gate was modernized, but the spillway remained historically intact as are the dam banks which continued to be covered with mowed grass. The lake was refilled and restocked with fish.

In 2021, the National Park Service led restoration work on the grounds of the Moses H. Cone Memorial Park. The renovations on the grounds included the construction of restrooms near the lake.
