= Paul Carroll (poet) =

American poet

Paul Carroll (July 15, 1927 – August 31, 1996) was an American poet and the founder of the Poetry Center of Chicago. A professor for many years at the University of Illinois at Chicago and professor emeritus, his books include Poem in Its Skin and Odes. While a student, he was an editor of Chicago Review. In 1985 he won the Chicago Poet's Award, and the city published his book "The Garden of Earthly Delights". His papers, The Paul Carroll Papers, are archived in the Special Collection Research Center at the University of Chicago Library. Among those papers are documents between Carroll's buddy, fellow poet and critic James Dickey, where Mr. Dickey states that Paul's late poetry was his best. One of these late poems, "Song After Making Love" was published in 2008 by Cold Mountain Review at Appalachian State University.

== Early life ==
Carrol was born and raised in Chicago. He earned his MA in 1952 from the University of Chicago. He worked as an editor for "the distinguished mainstream Chicago Review from 1957 to 1958, and later for the Beat magazine and publisher Big Table (review), which published his widely noted 1968 anthology The Young American Poets."

== Editorial impact ==
Carroll, along with fellow editor Irving Rosenthal, published several of the "Beat" writers in the Autumn 1958 issue, including excerpts of William S. Burroughs' Naked Lunch. After its release, reporter Jack Mabley wrote the article "Filthy Writing On the Midway," which appeared in the October 25, 1958 issue of the Chicago Daily News. Carroll and Rosenthal planned to continue excerpts of Burroughs' Naked Lunch and publish "Old Angel Midnight" by Jack Kerouac in the Winter 1959 issue.

After discussions between Rosenthal and members of the University of Chicago administration, Rosenthal resigned his editorship on November 17, 1958, followed the next day with the resignations of other Chicago Review editors including Carroll. The planned Winter 1959 issue was not published. On December 25, 1958, Rosenthal and Carroll founded the short-lived, but highly influential, journal Big Table.

Rosenthal edited the premier issue of Big Table, published on March 17, 1959, which published the Burroughs' Naked Lunch excerpts and Kerouac's "Old Angel Midnight" from the planned Winter 1959 issue of Chicago Review. The United States Post Office impounded over 400 copies and refused to deliver it because of "obscenity and filthy contents.” The initial court decision "found Big Table 1 obscene and filthy.” This decision was appealed, and Judge Julius Hoffman reversed the initial decision and stated that Big Table was not "obscene."

Carroll edited four more Big Table issues from 1959 to 1960. The fifth and final issue appeared after Hoffman's decision. Big Table published works by poets including John Ashbery, Robert Creeley, Allen Ginsberg, Barbara Guest, LeRoi Jones, Bill Knott (poet), Kathleen Norris (poet), and Denise Levertov.

== Academic career ==
Carroll also pursued an academic career. Carroll became a professor of English at the University of Illinois Chicago, where he founded the Program for Writers, the school's graduate program for creative writing, in 1971. He retired as professor emeritus in 1992.

Carroll authored several books of poems, Odes, The Luke Poems (1971), New and Selected Poems (1979), The Garden of Earthly Delights (1986), and The Beaver Dam Road Poems (1994), and criticism, including The Poem in Its Skin (1968)

Carroll was also a pioneer in bringing poetry to the Chicago community. In 1968, he organized poetry readings at the Museum of Contemporary Art, primarily to promote the publications of Big Table Books, started in 1969. Eventually, these events developed into The Poetry Center of Chicago, which held its first official event, Poets Look at Paintings, in 1974. In 1968 he also edited the influential The Young American Poets, presenting a younger generation, which went into four printings and was launched by the poets reading at the lofts of Robert Rauschenberg, Jasper Johns and Red Grooms in New York City.

In 1993, Paul Carroll and his wife, artist Maryrose Carroll, left Chicago to live on a small farm in the Blue Ridge Mountains of North Carolina. Here he continued to write poetry every day until his death from cancer on Labor Day weekend, 1996. He published two books at this location, The Beaver Dam Road Poems and Straight Poets I Have Known and Loved and his old friend, James Dickey, said that "this body of Paul's work was his finest." All of these poems are archived at the University of Chicago, Special Collections. His ashes reside in the columbarium wall at St. Elizabeth Catholic Church in Boone, North Carolina.

== Key publications ==
=== Poetry ===
- Odes. 1969. Big Table Publishing.
- The Luke Poems. 1971. Big Table Publishing.
- New and Selected Poems. 1978. Yellow Press.
- Garden of Earthly Delights. 1987. City of Chicago.
- Poems. 1988. Spoon River Poetry Press
- Poems & Psalms. 1990. Big Table Publishing.
- The Beaver Dam Road Poems. 1994. Big Table Publishing.
- Posthumously: God & Other Poems, 2016. Big Table Publishing.
- Posthumously: Love Poems ~ Poems de Amor. 2019. Big Table Publishing.
- Posthumously: www.BigTableBooks.com

=== Prose and editing ===
- Paul Carroll. 1957. “Prophet Without Honor,” Poetry. Vol. 90, No. 4 (Jul., 1957), pp. 254–256.
- Paul Carroll. 1968. The Poem In Its Skin. Follett Publishing Company.
- Paul Carroll. 1968. The Young American Poets. Chicago: Big Table Publishing
- Paul Carroll. 1991. Chicago Tales. Big Table Publishing.
- Paul Carroll 1998. From "Straight Poets I Have Known and Loved,"Chicago Review. Vol. 44, No. 1 (1998), 21-https://www.toutfait.com/the-wicked-and-unfaithful-song-of-marcel-duchamp-to-his-queen/
