= Crossing Knob =

Mountain in North Carolina, United States

- Location within North Carolina

Highest point
- Elevation: 3,340 ft (1,020 m)
- Coordinates: 36°15′43″N 81°51′56″W

Geography
- Location: Watauga County, North Carolina, U.S.
- Parent range: Blue Ridge Mountains
- Topo map: USGS Sherwood

Crossing Knob is a mountain in the North Carolina High Country, west from the community of Sugar Grove. The mountain is within the Pisgah National Forest and its elevation reaches 3,340 feet (1,018 m). The mountain is flanked by the Watauga River on three sides and US 321 along its south.
