= Chiaroscuro: The Private Lives of Leonardo da Vinci =

Comic book series from 1995 to 1996

- Chiaroscuro trade paperback cover

Publication information
- Publisher: Vertigo
- Format: Limited series
- Publication date: 1995-1996
- No. of issues: 10
- Main character(s): Leonardo da Vinci; Salai

Creative team
- Written by: Pat McGreal & David Rawson
- Penciller: Chaz Truog
- Inker: Rafael Kayanan
- Colorist(s): Carla Feeny & Lovern Kindzierski

Collected editions
- Chiaroscuro: The Private Lives of Leonardo da Vinci: ISBN 1-4012-0498-8

Chiaroscuro: The Private Lives of Leonardo da Vinci is a ten-issue Vertigo comic book limited series published from 1995 to 1996, which was repackaged in 2005 as a single volume. The series was written by Pat McGreal and David Rawson and illustrated by Chaz Truog and Rafael Kayanan. The original series covers were done by Stephen John Philips and Richard Bruning.

== Plot ==
A work of historical fiction, Chiaroscuro narrates the life of Leonardo da Vinci from the point of view of Gian Giacomo Caprotti da Oreno (almost exclusively called Salai in the story), a beautiful young man Leonardo adopted as a boy. It shows the influence of their relationship on Leonardo's life and work. In characterizing Salai as scheming, ambitious and selfish, the novel posits that several events in Leonardos's life occurred at least partly because of his manipulations.

The work also speculates a possible homosexual relationship between Leonardo and Salai. Salai is clearly depicted to have had homosexual relations with Leonardo's main rival, Michelangelo and Ludovico Sforza's captain, Sanseverino, while anything occurring between him and Leonardo is simply implied. It is clear, however, that Leonardo used him as a model for his artwork. The relationship between Salai and Leonardo is often tumultuous, culminating with Salai betraying Leonardo by serving as the model for Michelangelo's David.

Chiaroscuro is an art term meaning the play of light and dark in a work.

== Inspiration ==
Chaz Truog's official website mentions that Chiaroscuro was inspired by Amadeus and Immortal Beloved.

== Works of art ==
The following works by Leonardo da Vinci were also depicted in the story:

- Mona Lisa
- The Last Supper
- St John the Baptist
- Vitruvian Man
- The Battle of Anghiari
- several vignettes and images from his notebooks, diaries and sketches

== Publication history ==
Chiaroscuro was originally published in serial form from 1995 to 1996 before being collected as a trade paperback in 2005. It was nominated for the Eisner Award in 1996 for Best Limited Series.

=== Collected editions ===
- Chiaroscuro: The Private Lives of Leonardo da Vinci (trade paperback collects issues #1-10, October 2005, ISBN 1-4012-0498-8)

== See also ==
- Cultural references to Leonardo da Vinci

== Literature ==
Keazor, Henry: "Zwischen Prometheus und Adam: Dave Rawsons, Pat McGreals und Chaz Truogs 'Chiaroscuro – The Private Lives of Leonardo da Vinci' (1995-96)", in: Geschichte und Mythos in Comcis und Graphic Novels, ed. by Tanja Zimmermann, Berlin 2019, p. 373-406
