= Blowing Rock (land feature) =

Coordinates: 36°06′49″N 81°39′40″W

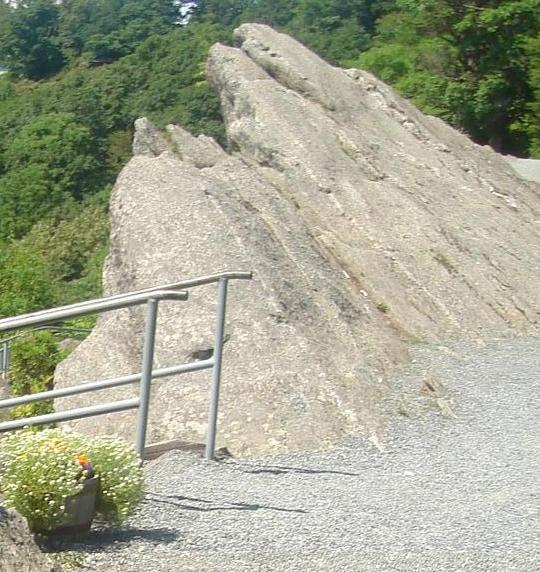
The actual Blowing Rock land feature as seen from the Blowing Rock Park

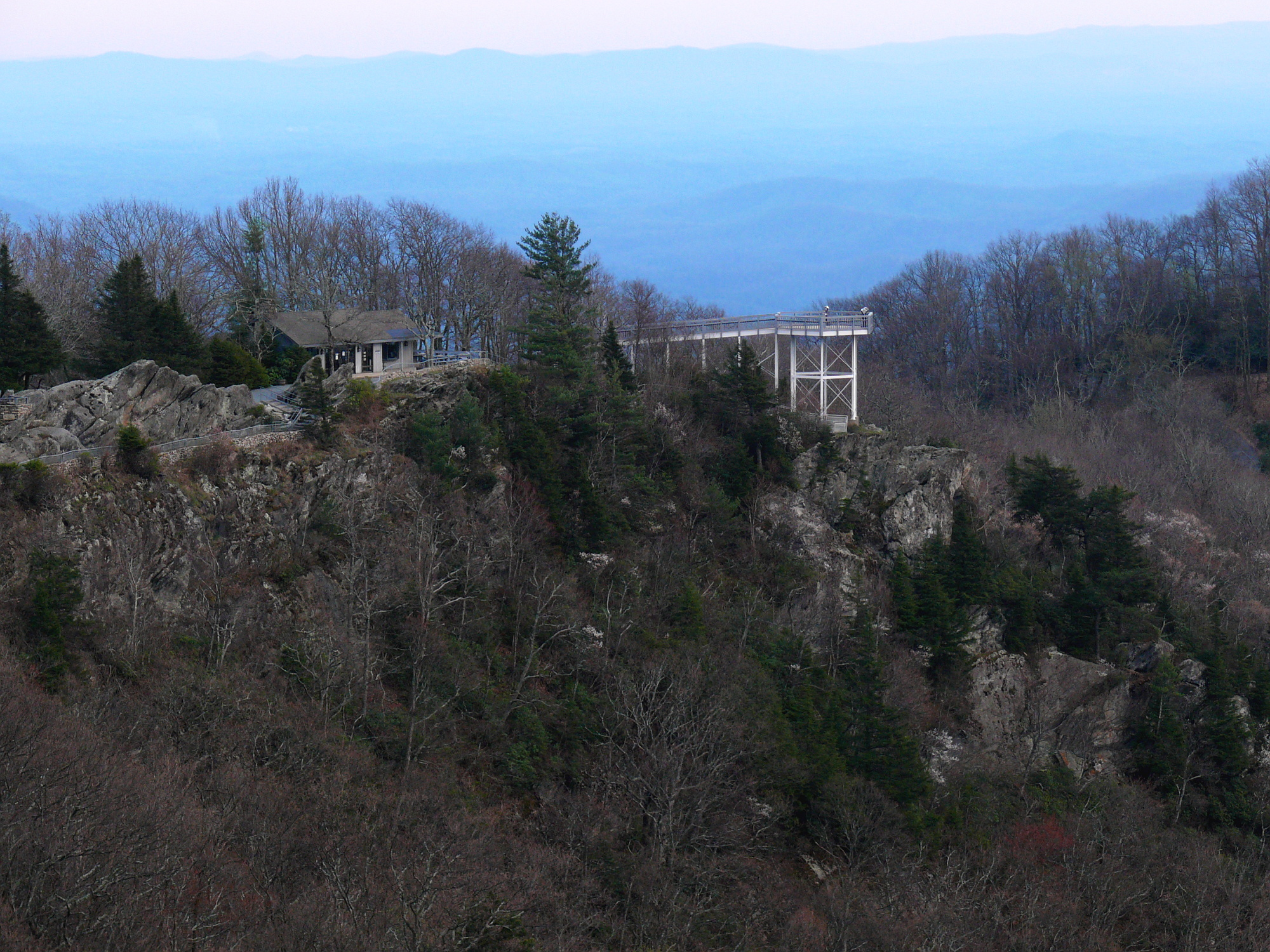
The observation deck at Blowing Rock.

Blowing Rock is a rocky outcropping land feature in the town of Blowing Rock, North Carolina, above a gorge in the northern most portion of Caldwell County.

The prevailing wind blows through the gorge toward Blowing Rock. There, at the end of the gorge, the wind's path of least resistance is up the steep slopes surmounted by the outcropping, resulting in a nearly vertical and typically strong wind.

The legend of the Blowing Rock is that a Cherokee brave leapt from the rock into the wilderness below, only to have a gust of wind return him to his lover on top of the rock. This is a typical example of a lover's leap legend. Blowing Rock is private property; a fee for access is payable at the adjacent souvenir shop.

The 2008 feature film Goodbye Solo features Blowing Rock in its concluding scene.
