= Rafael Kayanan =

American comic book artist

- Born: 1962 (age 63–64) Manila, Philippines
- Areas: Penciller, Inker
- Notable works: The Fury of Firestorm; Chiaroscuro: The Private Lives of Leonardo da Vinci

Rafael Kayanan (born 1962) is a Filipino-born naturalized American comics artist and Filipino martial arts master in the Sayoc Kali system.

== Biography ==
=== Comics ===
Rafael Kayanan stated in a 2007 interview that he "grew up with Filipino Komiks masters like Alcala, Coching, and Redondo mixed in with Kirby, Sy Barry's The Phantom, Kubert's Tarzan, and Hal Foster's Prince Valiant. From there I discovered Barry Windsor-Smith, Starlin, Adams, Wrightson, and Gulacy in the 70's [sic]. I copied and then drew my own stories on the backs of old xeroxes my mom would bring home from work."

He has illustrated for American major comic book publishers. His work includes Marvel Comics' Conan the Adventurer, Acclaim Comics' Turok, and DC Comics' Firestorm and America vs. the Justice Society. He also inked the Eisner Award-nominated series Chiaroscuro: The Life and Times of Leonardo Da Vinci for Vertigo.

Kayanan has illustrated concept designs for comic book, film and game companies. During the late 1990s, he was the creator and art director for Cross Plains Comics featuring the pulp magazine characters created by Robert E. Howard. Kayanan developed concept designs for Nintendo's Turok: Dinosaur Hunter II video game. He currently continues to do work for Topps Cards on licenses such as Star Wars and The Lord of the Rings.

Other titles he has worked on include The Amazing Spider-Man, Star Wars, Magic: The Gathering, and Batman: Legends of the Dark Knight.

Kayanan's art has been praised for its rapid tempo, storytelling pace and layered depth.

Additional comic book work can be found in Dark Horse Comics' Conan #39, Annihilation, and fantasy novelist R.A. Salvatore's Drizzt, Worlds of Dungeons & Dragons from Devil's Due Publishing.

During his collaboration with writer Gerry Conway on DC's The Fury of Firestorm series in 1984, Kayanan co-created three characters which have appeared in live-action media. The supporting character Felicity Smoak on The CW television series Arrow debuted in The Fury of Firestorm #23 (May 1984). The supervillain Slipknot first appeared in The Fury of Firestorm #28 (October 1984) and appeared in the Suicide Squad film in 2016. The supervillain Weasel first appeared in The Fury of Firestorm #35 (May 1985) and appeared in The Suicide Squad film in 2021. Kayanan co-created the third Spider-Woman, Mattie Franklin, who first appeared in The Amazing Spider-Man #441 (1998)

=== Film and television ===
Kayanan is a Master-level edged weapons (knife, sword, tomahawk) expert and instructor in Sayoc Kali. This rare combination of a visual and martial artist, has led to projects which utilize both skills to illustrate fight storyboards for film and TV. Kayanan choreographed and trained the actors, in William Friedkin's The Hunted starring Benicio del Toro and Tommy Lee Jones. He also trained actor Sam Rockwell for director George Clooney's film Confessions of a Dangerous Mind. Kayanan was a development artist, fight trainer and weapons consultant for Paramount Pictures adaptation of Edgar Rice Burroughs' John Carter of Mars. His art was used for the CBS tv show NCIS: Los Angeles. Kayanan designed fights for the main cast of LL Cool J, Chris O' Donnell, Daniela Ruah and Eric Christian Olsen, as well as special guest stars Danny Trejo, Ernie Reyes Jr., and Daniel Henney. Kayanan was the technical advisor for the close quarter fights inside the airplane of the film Non-Stop starring Liam Neeson.

Rafael Kayanan was a set illustrator and story board artist for the Spider-Man: Turn Off the Dark Broadway show, directed by Julie Taymor with music created by Bono and the Edge.

Kayanan worked on concept illustration for the films Immortals and Mirror, Mirror both directed by Tarsem Singh from Relativity Media, and the related graphic novel anthology Immortals: Gods and Heroes published by Archaia.

Other projects include the Discovery TV show Lone Target, also known internationally as Manhunt, starring former Navy SEAL Joel Lambert. The Kayanan designed RnD Hawk, Bontoc and Madumi Sayoc Kali-Daniel Winkler knives were prominently featured in this show.

Kayanan’s Sayoc Winkler RnD Hawk is also featured in both the tv and book series Terminal List, written by Jack Carr.

== Bibliography ==
As artist unless otherwise noted

=== Acclaim/Valiant ===
- Ice Age on the World of Magic: The Gathering #1–4 (1995)
- Turok #1–4 (1998)
- Turok: Tales of the Lost Land #1 (1998)

=== Archaia Entertainment ===
- Immortals: Gods and Heroes (2011)

=== Cross Plains Comics ===
- Robert E. Howard: A Short Biography #1 (1999)
- Robert E. Howard: Myth Maker #1 (1999)

=== Dark Horse Comics ===
- Conan #39 (2007)
- Star Wars: Chewbacca #4 (2000)

=== Devil's Due ===
- Worlds of Dungeons and Dragons (2008)

=== DC Comics ===
- America vs. the Justice Society #1 (1985)
- Babylon 5: In Valen's Name (1998 as cover artist)
- Batman: Legends of The Dark Knight #124 (1999)
- Captain Atom #29–33, 35–40, 42–44, 47–48, 50 (1989–1991)
- Fury of Firestorm #20–21, 23–30, 33–36, 38–39, 41–44, 50, Annual #1–4 (1984–1986)
- He-Man and the Masters of the Universe #7–8 (2013–2014)

==== Vertigo ====
- Animal Man Annual #1 (1993 as inker)
- Chiaroscuro: The Life and Times of Leonardo Da Vinci #1–10 (1995–1996 as inker)
- Shade, the Changing Man vol. 2 #64, 67 (1995–1996 as inker)

=== Eclipse Comics ===
- Phaze #1–2 (1988)

=== First Comics ===
- Hawkmoon: The Jewel in the Skull #1–4 (1986)
- Hawkmoon: The Mad God's Amulet #1–4 (1987)
- Hawkmoon: The Runestaff #1–4 (1988)
- Hawkmoon: The Sword of Dawn #1–4 (1987–1988)

=== Image Comics ===
- Resident Evil #4 (1998)

=== Marvel Comics ===
- The Amazing Spider-Man #437, 439–441 (1998)
- Conan the Adventurer #1–5, 9–14 (1994–1995)
- Conan the Savage #7 (1996)
- A Moment of Silence #1 (2001)
- Savage Sword of Conan #211–213, 215, 217 (1993–1994)
- What If? vol. 2 #83 (1996)
- What If? Annihilation #1 (2008)
- What If? Daredevil Vs. Elektra #1 (2010)
- Within Our Reach #1 (1992)

=== Smart Pop ===
- Triumph of the Walking Dead (2011 as cover artist)

=== Topps ===
- Frankenstein (1994 as sketch card artist)
- Jurassic Park (1994 as sketch card artist)
- Lord of the Rings Evolution (2005 as sketch card artist)
- Lord of the Rings Masterpieces (2006 as sketch card artist)
- Star Wars Clone Wars (2004 as sketch card artist)
- Star Wars Heritage (2005 as sketch card artist)
- Star Wars 30th Anniversary (2007 as sketch card artist)

== Filmography ==
- The Hunted (2003) (fight choreographer)
- Confessions of a Dangerous Mind (2004) (trainer)
- Immortals(2011) (concept illustrator)
- Non-Stop (2014) (fight choreographer)
- NCIS: Los Angeles (fight technical advisor – seven episodes)
- How I Got There (2022) (fight choreographer)
- The Featherweight (2023) (fight choreographer)

Preceded by Gene Colan	The Fury of Firestorm artist 1984–1986	Succeeded by George Tuska
Preceded by Pat Broderick	Captain Atom artist 1989–1991	Succeeded by Colleen Doran
Preceded by John Buscema	Savage Sword of Conan artist 1993–1994	Succeeded by E. R. Cruz
Preceded by Joe Bennett	The Amazing Spider-Man artist 1998–1999	Succeeded by John Byrne
