= America vs. the Justice Society =

Four-part comic book series

America vs. The Justice Society
- Cover of America vs. The Justice Society #1.

Publication information
- Publisher: DC Comics
- Schedule: Monthly
- Format: Limited series
- Publication date: January - April 1985
- No. of issues: 4
- Main character(s): Justice Society of America

Creative team
- Written by: Roy Thomas; Dann Thomas
- Penciller(s): Rafael Kayanan; Rich Buckler; Jerry Ordway

America vs. The Justice Society is a four-issue comic book mini-series starring the Justice Society of America which was first published by DC Comics between January and April 1985.

The series was written by Roy and Dann Thomas and featured artwork from Rafael Kayanan, Rich Buckler and Jerry Ordway among others.

== Plot ==
On Earth-Two, authorities discover the diary of Batman, who was murdered by a criminal named Bill Jensen. The diary indicates that the Justice Society is guilty of treason during World War II and conspired to cover up their treason after the war was over.

The group is put on trial and their history is reviewed. All the historical adventures involving the JSA are recalled, and details are added. The diary is a hoax created by Batman in an effort to have the JSA apprehend Per Degaton following Batman's death. Degaton is apprehended by the Justice Society, but he apparently commits suicide.

Issue #2, "Trial by Congress", depicts the events surrounding the retirement of the Justice Society in 1951. It shows how the team chose to disband rather than appear in front of the House Un-American Activities Committee, which demanded that they unmask themselves. Those events had been explored in more detail in a story in Adventure Comics #466 ("The Defeat of the Justice Society!"; December 1979) by writer Paul Levitz, which was the longest (and last) JSA story in Adventure prior to the cancellation of the series. Throughout American vs. the Justice Society, many other Justice Society of America stories are similarly retold as part of the examination of their history which takes place at their trial, covering all of their cases originally published in All-Star Comics #3-57, All-Star's revival in the 1970s (#58-74), all of the JLA/JSA team-ups told in the pages of Justice League of America, the cases in Adventure Comics, and the cases told in All-Star Squadron.

== Background and creation ==
Writer Dann Thomas came up with the premise for the story, inspired by the then-recent scandal surrounding the Hitler Diaries hoax.

== Collected issues ==
AMERICA VS. THE JUSTICE SOCIETY #1-4. 978-1401255091
