= Daniel Winkler (knifemaker) =

American knife maker

Daniel Winkler is an American custom knifemaker based in Blowing Rock, North Carolina.

== Knifemaking ==
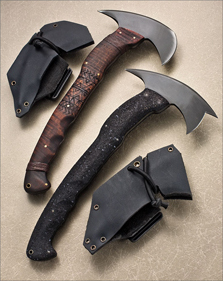
R&D Hawk by Sayoc-Winkler Knives 2

Winkler has been making knives since 1977 and is a certified Mastersmith with the American Bladesmith Society and designed and built the knives and tomahawks for the 1992 motion picture The Last of the Mohicans.

Winkler was primarily known for his Native-American or pioneer-style influenced designs until 2012. In that year Winkler became involved with military and tactical knives and tomahawks.

Winkler is also credited in the New York Times for having his hatchets used by the Navy Seals, particularly Seal Team 6.

Winkler designed the Sayoc-Winkler "R&D Hawk" in conjunction with Sayoc Tactical Group Tomahawk Instructor Rafael Kayanan as a tomahawk for modern military applications.
