= Conan the Adventurer (comics) =

1994–1995 comic book series

Publication information
- Publisher: Marvel Comics
- Schedule: Monthly
- Format: Ongoing series
- Genre: Action/adventure, fantasy
- Publication date: June 1994 – July 1995
- No. of issues: 14
- Main character(s): Conan

Creative team
- Written by: Roy Thomas
- Artist(s): Rafael Kayanan; John Watkiss
- Inker(s): John Floyd
- Letterer(s): John Costanza
- Colorist(s): Nel Yomtov
- Editor(s): Richard Ashford

Conan the Adventurer was a comic book series published by Marvel Comics for 14 issues from 1994 to 1995. Written by Roy Thomas and illustrated in most cases by Rafael Kayanan, it follows the travels of a young Conan the Barbarian, seeing the world for the first time. It was aimed at a younger audience than the earlier Conan books.
