= Thomas H. Buxton =

American academic (1940–2026)

- Born: Thomas Hamilton Buxton; January 18, 1940; Blowing Rock, North Carolina, U.S.
- Died: October 14, 2026 (aged 86); West Columbia, South Carolina, U.S.
- Education: Indiana University Bloomington; University of Nebraska–Lincoln
- Occupation: Academic
- Spouse: Louise McGraw

Thomas Hamilton Buxton (January 18, 1940 – October 14, 2026) was an American academic.

== Early life and career ==
Buxton was born in Blowing Rock, North Carolina, on January 18, 1940, the son of Kennard Buxton and Carrie Miller. He attended and graduated from Blowing Rock High School. After graduating, he attended Wake Forest University on a full academic scholarship. He earned his master's degree in education at Indiana University Bloomington, and earned his PhD degree at the University of Nebraska–Lincoln. After earning his degrees, he taught Latin at North Mecklenburg High School.

He served as a professor in the department of educational leadership and policies at the University of South Carolina until 1997. During his years as a professor, he was named a distinguished professor.

== Personal life and death ==
Buxton was married to Louise McGraw. Their marriage lasted until Buxton's death in 2026.

Buxton died at his home in West Columbia, South Carolina, on October 14, 2026, at the age of 86.
