= Ward Family House =

Historic house in North Carolina, United States

- U.S. National Register of Historic Places
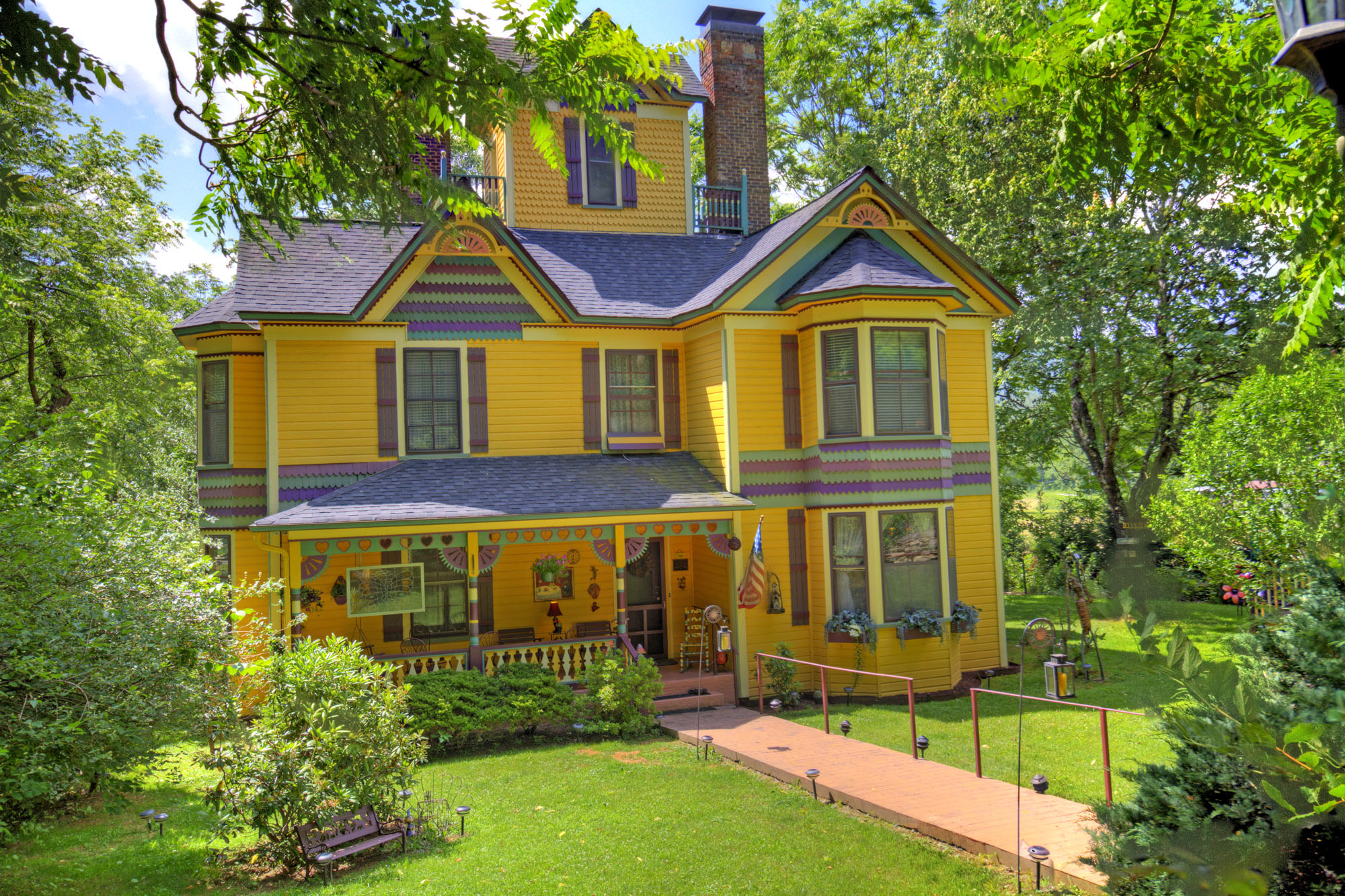
- Ward Family House, June 2015

- Location within North Carolina Location within the United States
- Location: 8018 Rominger Rd., near Sugar Grove, North Carolina
- Coordinates: 36°14′50″N 81°49′21″W
- Area: 3.1 acres (1.3 ha)
- Built: c. 1897
- Architectural style: Queen Anne
- NRHP reference No.: 97000473
- Added to NRHP: May 23, 1997

Ward Family House is a historic home located near Sugar Grove, Watauga County, North Carolina. It was built about 1897, and is a two-story, Queen Anne style frame dwelling. It is sheathed in novelty German siding and gables with five rows of diamond-edge wood shingles. Atop the roof is a cupola located between asymmetrically placed brick chimneys with stucco panels. A one-story rear ell was added in the 1980s.

It was listed on the National Register of Historic Places in 1997.
