= Wilson-Vines House =

Historic house in North Carolina, United States

- U.S. National Register of Historic Places
- Location within North Carolina Location within the United States
- Location: 4300 Rush Branch Rd., near Beaver Dam, North Carolina
- Coordinates: 36°17′30″N 81°50′57″W
- Area: 16.8 acres (6.8 ha)
- Built: c. 1895
- Architectural style: Queen Anne, L-plan
- NRHP reference No.: 97001562
- Added to NRHP: December 22, 1997

Wilson-Vines House, also known as the Roby Vines House, is a historic home located near Beaver Dam, Watauga County, North Carolina. It was built about 1895, and is a 2 1/2-story, L-plan, Queen Anne style frame dwelling. It rests on a stone foundation and is sheathed in clapboard and German siding. The front facade features a two-story, two-piered, 3/4 width porch with decorative sawnwork.

It was listed on the National Register of Historic Places in 1997.
