= Saint Elizabeth Catholic Church =

Church in North Carolina, US

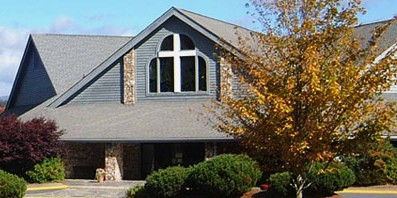

Religion
- Affiliation: Roman Catholic Church
- Diocese: Diocese of Charlotte
- Province: Archdiocese of Atlanta
- Leadership: Bishop Michael Thomas Martin OFM Conv.

Location
- Location: Boone, North Carolina; United States
- Interactive map of Saint Elizabeth Catholic Church
- Coordinates: 36.194654°N 81.660445°W

Architecture
- Architect: David Moses
- General contractor: Albert Olszewski
- Completed: 1988

Specifications
- Capacity: 420
- Materials: wood, stone, brick

Website
- Saint Elizabeth Catholic Church

Saint Elizabeth Catholic Church (sometimes called Saint Elizabeth of the Hill Country Catholic Church) is a parish church of the Roman Catholic Diocese of Charlotte located in Boone, North Carolina. Its canonical territory includes all of Watauga County. Father Brendan Buckler is the pastor.

The parish had its beginnings in the 1940s for the few Catholic families and students at Appalachian State University. Early celebrations of Mass took place in the homes of residents before a new church was built in 1958. The Church continues to serve Appalachian State students.

Priests from St. John Baptiste deLasalle in North Wilkesboro served the people in this new parish. In 1964 Glenmary Home Missioners served the parish until it was returned to the Diocese of Charlotte in 1973. The first Glenmary pastor was Fr. Ed Smith. The first diocesan pastor was Fr. George Kloster. The first church structure was gutted by a fire in 1984. New property was found and a second structure was built in 1988. Fr. Frank Connolly was the pastor during the building of this church. Additional space for education was built in 1993 under pastor Fr. H. Cornell Bradley, S.J.

Daily Masses are at 6:00 PM Tuesdays, 12:15 PM Wednesdays, 9:30 AM Thursdays and a Traditional Latin Mass at 9:30 AM on Fridays. Saturday Vigil is at 4:15 PM and Sunday Masses are 9:00 AM (English), 11:30 AM (Spanish) and 1:00 PM Traditional Latin Mass.

Also offered is the Sacrament of Confession at 11:45 AM and 5:00 PM Wednesdays, 9:00 AM Thursdays and Fridays and 3:00 PM Saturdays. Adoration is held 5:00 - 6:00 PM Wednesdays (also including Confessions) and 10:00 AM – 7:00 PM Thursdays.

Saint Elizabeth operates a seasonal mission church, Church of the Epiphany, located in nearby Blowing Rock. Mass is offered at 6:00 PM on Saturday mid-May through mid-October.

The parish clergy serve the sacramental needs of the Appalachian State Catholic Campus Ministry, a vicarial organization for college students within the parish. CCM is financially divorced from the parish, however, and funded by the Diocese of Charlotte. Parishioners are active in CCM and students are encouraged to be a fully functioning part of the Parish.

== See also ==
- Catholic Church in the United States
- Elizabeth (biblical figure)
