= Moses H. Cone Memorial Park =

Park in North Carolina, United States

- Flat Top Estate
- U.S. National Register of Historic Places
- U.S. Historic district
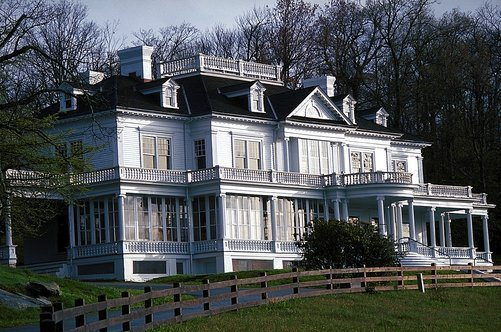
- Moses Cone Manor

- Location within North Carolina Location within the United States
- Location: Blue Ridge Parkway, milepost 292.8 to 295.5, near Blowing Rock, North Carolina
- Coordinates: 36°8′53″N 81°41′36″W
- Area: 3,496 acres (1,415 ha)
- Built: 1901
- Architectural style: Colonial Revival
- NRHP reference No.: 13000978
- Added to NRHP: December 24, 2013

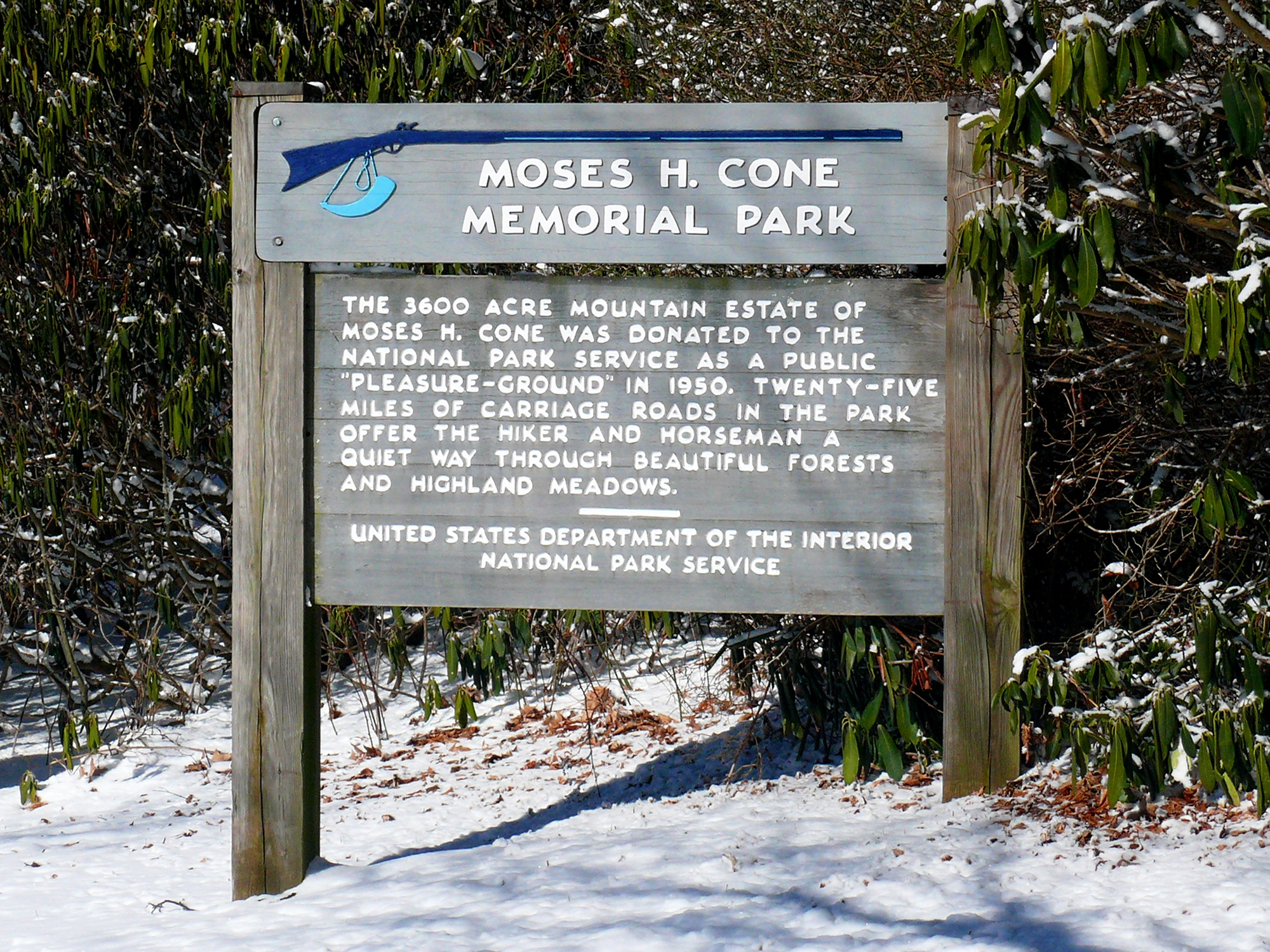
Park sign near Flat Top Manor

The Moses H. Cone Memorial Park is a country estate in honor of Moses H. Cone in Blowing Rock, North Carolina. It is on the Blue Ridge Parkway between mileposts 292 and 295 with access at milepost 294. Most locals call it Cone Park. The park is run by the National Park Service and is open to the public. It contains 3,500 acres (14 km^{2}), a 16-acre (65,000 m^{2}) trout lake, a 22-acre (89,000 m^{2}) Bass Lake and 25 miles (40 km) of carriage trails for hiking and horses. The main feature of the park is a twenty-three room 13,000-square-foot (1,200 m^{2}) mansion called Flat Top Manor built around the early 1900s. At the manor, there is a craft shop and demonstration center, along with an information desk and book store.

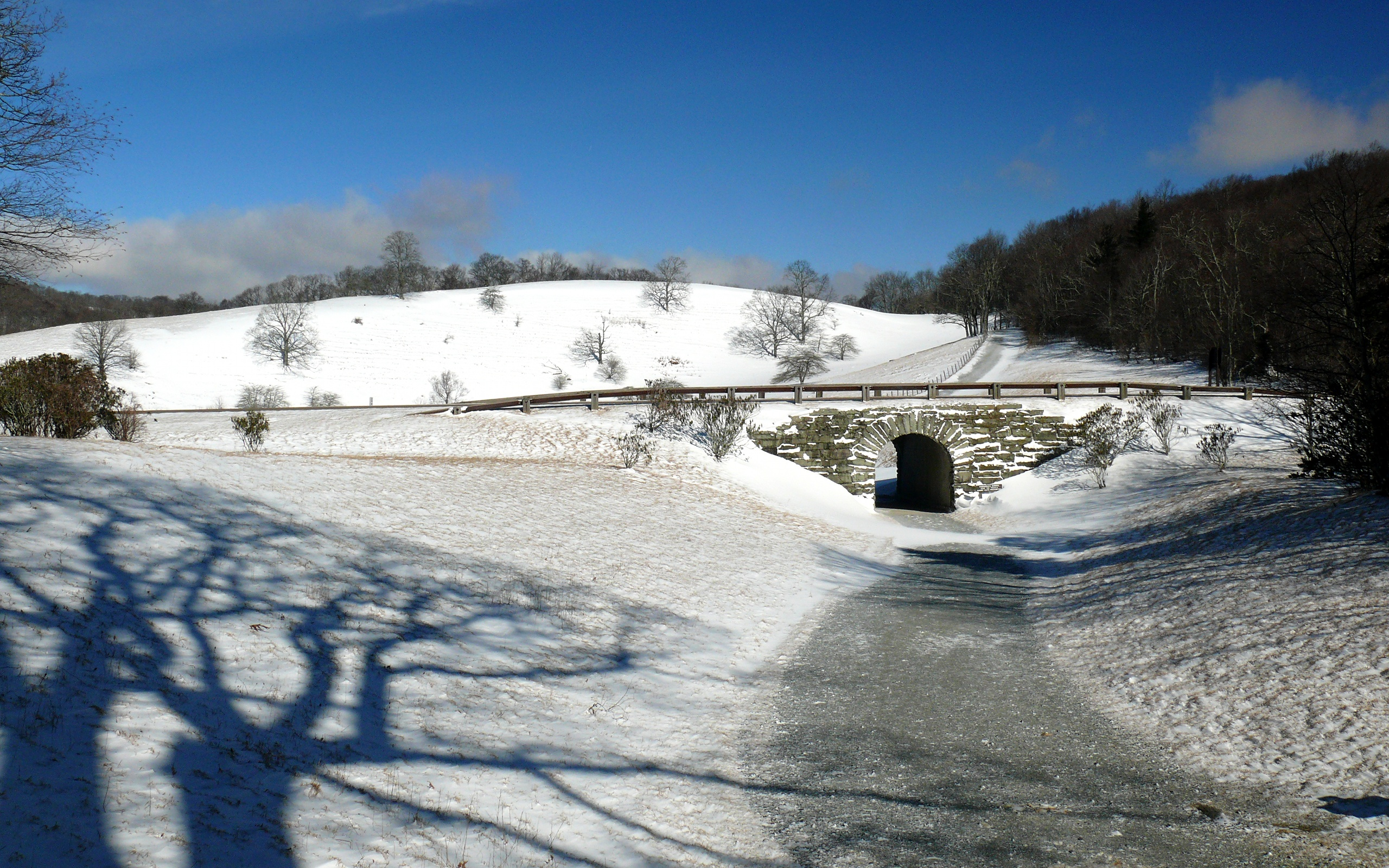
Hiking and horseback trails

The activities in the park are walking, hiking, cross-country skiing, and horseback riding. More people use the park for hiking and horseback riding than any other activity. There is also fishing available at the two nearby fishing lakes. Many people also do amateur and professional photography, especially in the autumn. The park is open year-round and sees 225,000 people each year being the most visited recreational place on the Blue Ridge Parkway and second in visitors after the Folk Art Center that sees 250,000 visitors. Together with the Julian Price Memorial Park, it is the largest developed area set aside for public recreation on the Blue Ridge Parkway.

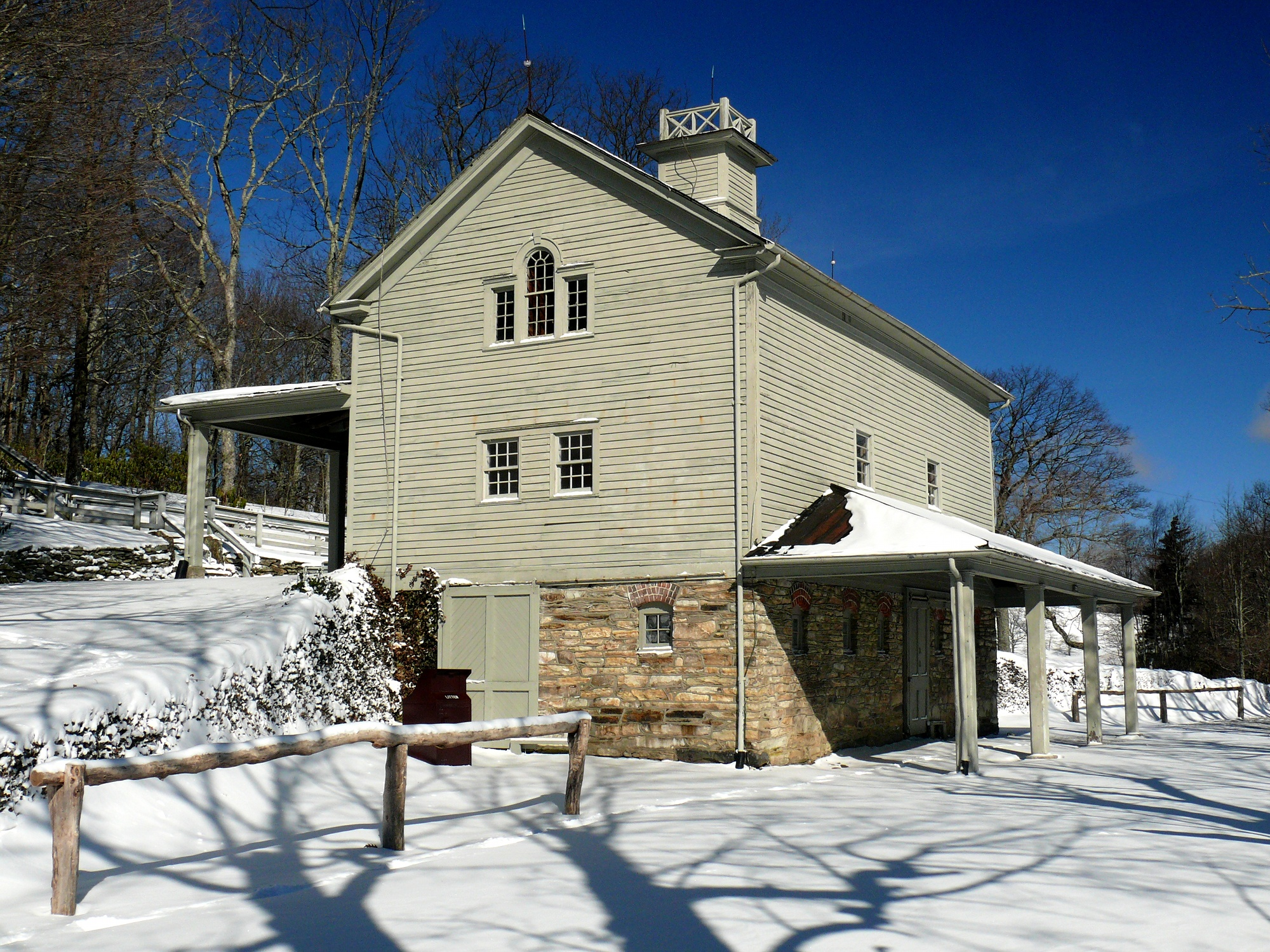
Carriage house

Moses obtained advice from noted conservationist Gifford Pinchot, the pioneering forester at the Biltmore Estate and First Chief of the US Forest Service, on planting white pine forests and hemlock hedges.

It was listed on the National Register of Historic Places in 2013 as Flat Top Estate, a national historic district. The district encompasses four contributing buildings and two contributing sites. They include the historic landscape, Flat Top Manor house (1899-1900), carriage house (c. 1899–1905), Cone Cemetery (1908), Sandy Flat Missionary Baptist Church (1908), and the apple barn.
