= Cove Creek High School =

Historic school building in North Carolina, United States

- U.S. National Register of Historic Places
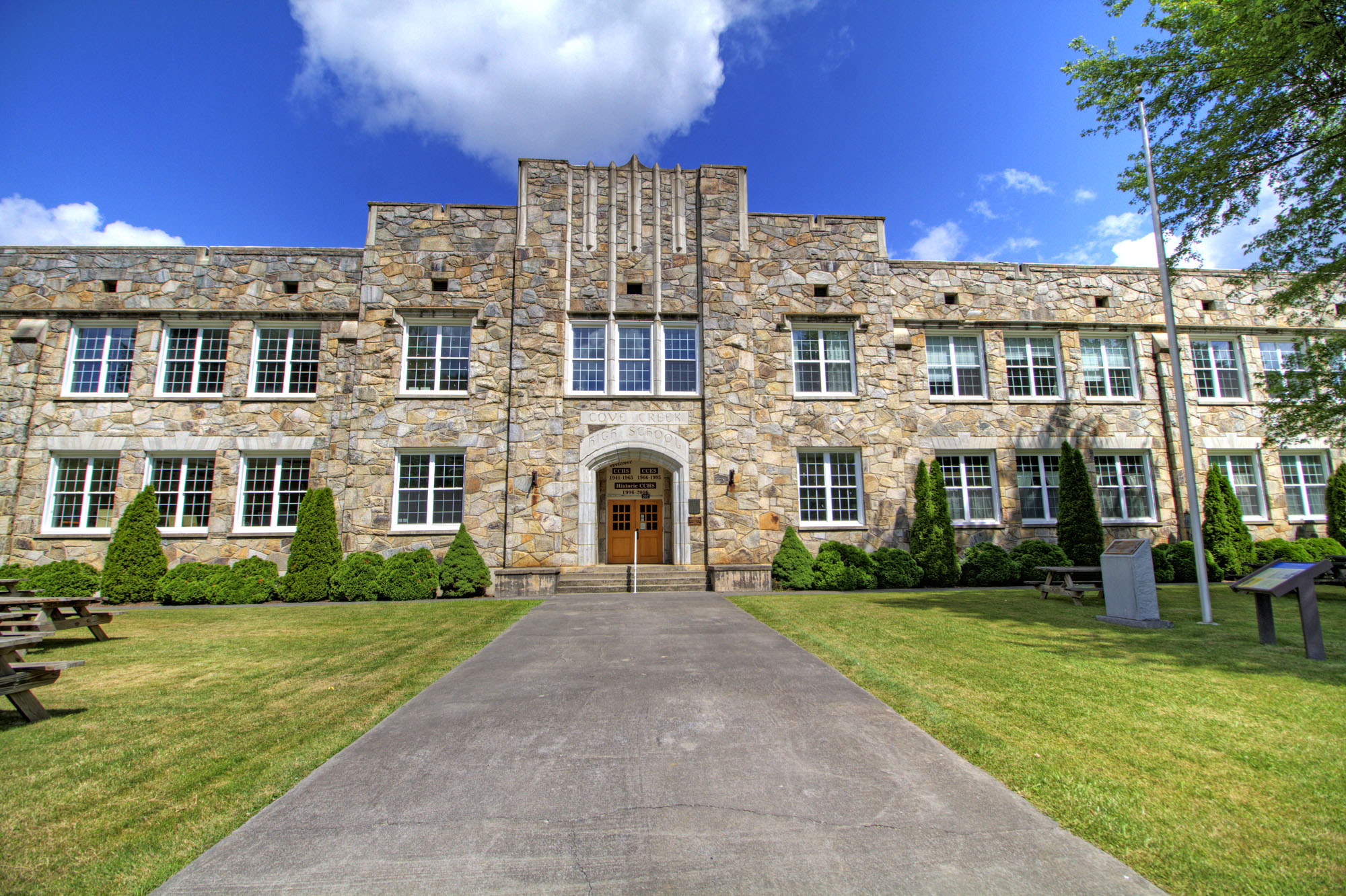
- Cove Creek High School, June 2015

- Location within North Carolina Location within the United States
- Location: 207 Dale Adams Rd., Sugar Grove, North Carolina
- Coordinates: 36°15′47″N 81°47′07″W
- Area: 10.5 acres (4.2 ha)
- Built: 1940-1941
- Built by: WPA
- Architect: Coffey, Clarence
- Architectural style: Collegiate Gothic
- NRHP reference No.: 98000707
- Added to NRHP: June 18, 1998

Cove Creek High School, also known as the Cove Creek Elementary School, is a historic high school building located at Sugar Grove, Watauga County, North Carolina. It was built by the Works Progress Administration in 1940–1941, and is a two-story, Collegiate Gothic style stone building. It is seven bays wide and features slightly projecting square stair towers and a crenellated roof parapet. It was designed by Clarence R. Coffey, an apprentice of Frank Lloyd Wright, and constructed by local artisans and laborers using local stone and wood sources.

It was listed on the National Register of Historic Places in 1998.
