= William Allen Blair House =

Historic house in North Carolina, United States

- U.S. National Register of Historic Places
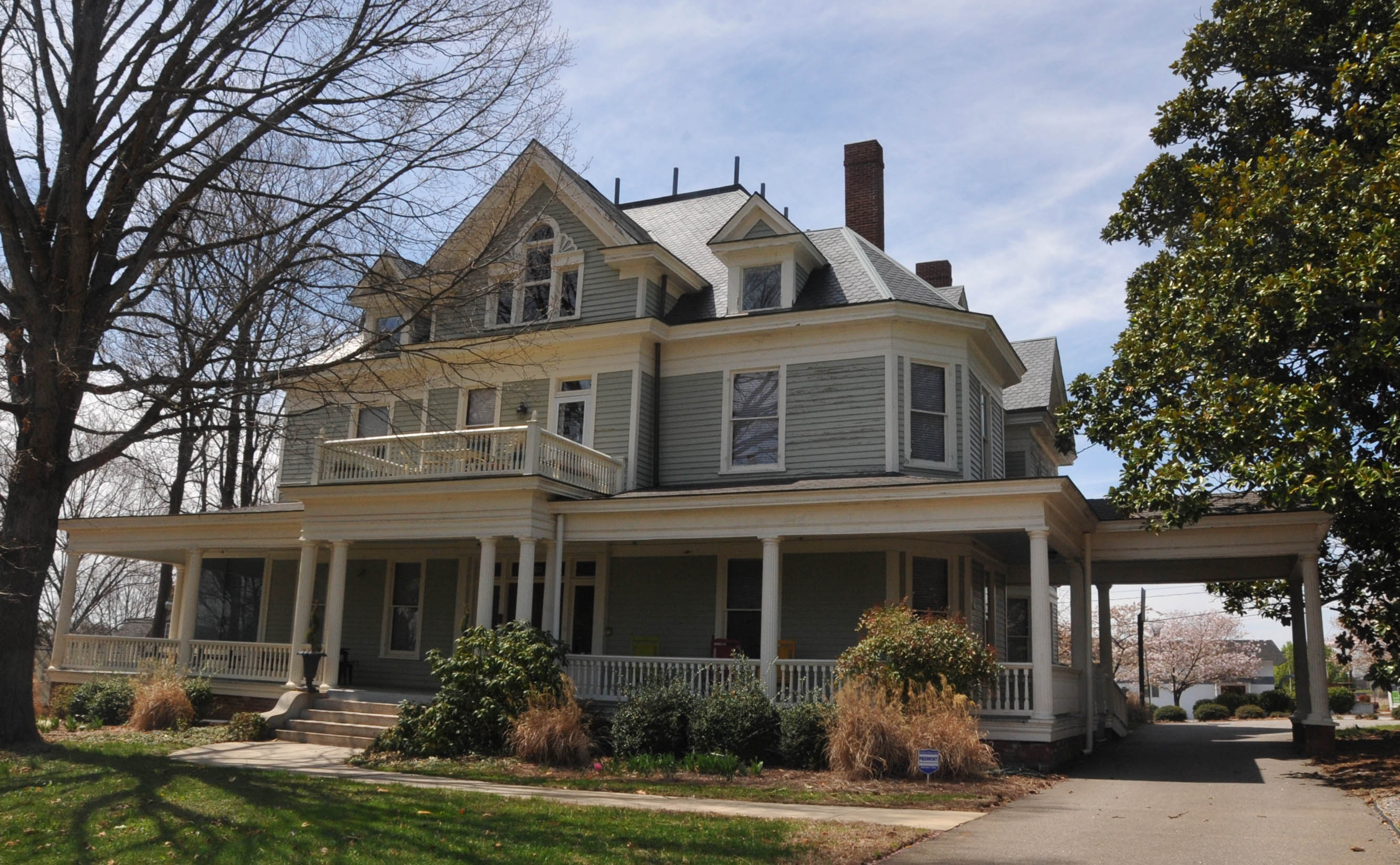
- William Allen Blair House, September 2007

- Location within North Carolina Location within the United States
- Location: 210 S. Cherry St., Winston-Salem, North Carolina
- Coordinates: 36°5′31″N 80°14′48″W
- Area: less than one acre
- Built: 1901
- Built by: Fogle Bros.
- Architectural style: Colonial Revival
- NRHP reference No.: 85000876
- Added to NRHP: April 25, 1985

William Allen Blair House is a historic home located at Winston-Salem, Forsyth County, North Carolina. It was built in 1901, and is a two-story, Colonial Revival style frame dwelling. It has a one-story, wrap-around front porch and Porte-cochère. The house features a high hipped roof with gabled dormers and central facade gable with a projecting second story bay and a Palladian window.

It was listed on the National Register of Historic Places in 1985.
