= Vardell Family Cottages Historic District =

Historic houses in North Carolina, United States

- U.S. National Register of Historic Places
- U.S. Historic district
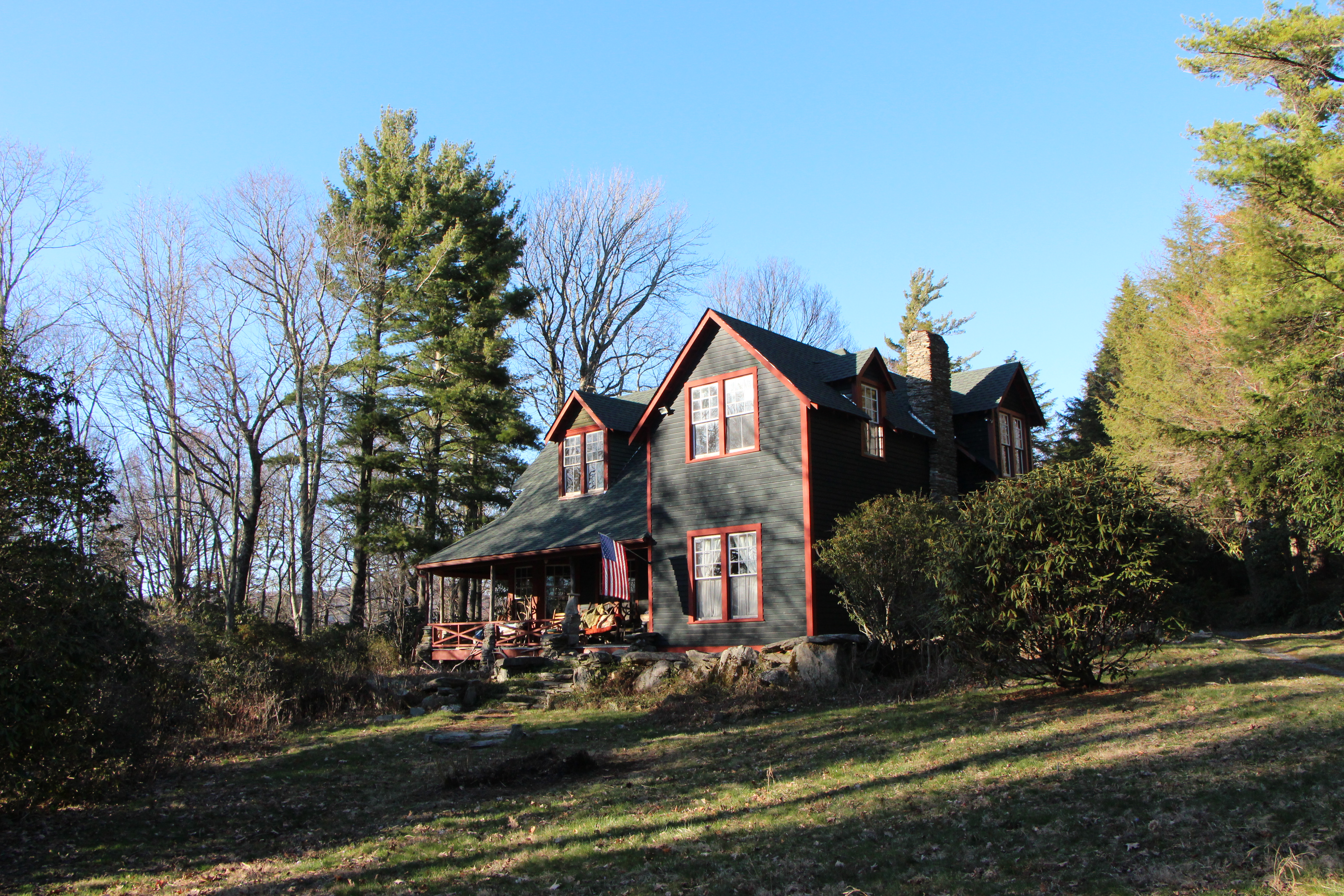
- Opicherhoka

- Location within North Carolina Location within the United States
- Location: 222 Grandfather Ave, 137, 187, 209 Chestnut Circle, Blowing Rock, North Carolina
- Coordinates: 36°7′36″N 81°40′42″W
- Area: 3.7 acres (1.5 ha)
- Built: 1899-1900, c. 1903, 1933
- Built by: Hartley, Roe; White, Joseph N.
- Architectural style: Bungalow/craftsman
- NRHP reference No.: 01000254
- Added to NRHP: March 12, 2001

Vardell Family Cottages Historic District are three historic summer homes and national historic district located at Blowing Rock, Watauga County, North Carolina. They are Opicherhoka (1899-1900), Hemlock Cottage (c. 1903, 1950s), and The Shoe (1933). Opicherhoka is a picturesque two-story, weatherboarded frame Arts and Crafts-style dwelling. Hemlock Cottage is a small rectangular, plainly-finished, weatherboarded, frame cottage. It consists of a two-story, two-room main block, a one-story shed roof front porch, and a gable roof ell. The Shoe is a small rectangular Arts and Crafts style one-story-with-loft frame cottage.

It was listed on the National Register of Historic Places in 2001.
