= Former Randall Memorial Building =

- U.S. National Register of Historic Places
- Location within North Carolina Location within the United States
- Location: Greenway Ct., Blowing Rock, North Carolina
- Coordinates: 36°7′55″N 81°40′40″W
- Area: 0.2 acres (0.081 ha)
- Built: 1907
- Architectural style: Bungalow/craftsman
- NRHP reference No.: 91000263
- Added to NRHP: March 14, 1991

The former Randall Memorial Building, also known as the Village Cafe, is a historic commercial building located at Blowing Rock, Watauga County, North Carolina. It was built in 1907, and is a 1 1/2-story, weatherboarded cottage with steep gable roof. It has a one-story hip roofed wing. It was built by the local Episcopal Church congregation to serve as a workshop and training center for mountain handicrafts. It later served as a community centre.

It was listed on the National Register of Historic Places in 1991.
