= Sugar Grove, North Carolina =

Sugar Grove
- Unincorporated community
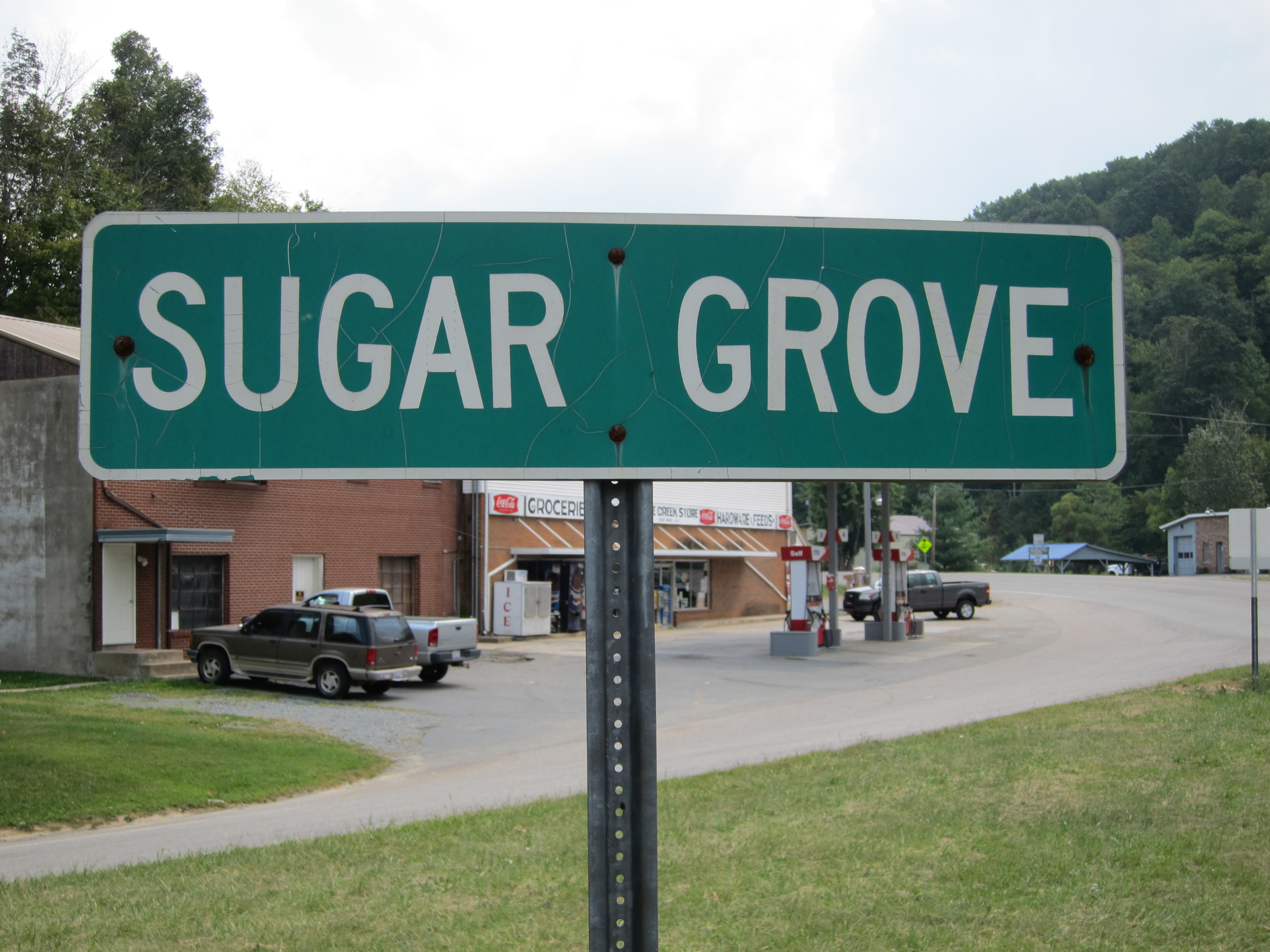

- Location within the state of North Carolina
- Coordinates: 36°15′28″N 81°47′17″W
- Country: United States
- State: North Carolina
- County: Watauga County
- Founded: 1837
- Named for: The sugar maple
- Elevation: 2,677 ft (816 m)
- Time zone: UTC-5 (Eastern (EST))
  - Summer (DST): UTC-4 (EDT)
- ZIP code: 28679
- Area code: 828
- GNIS feature ID: 1015921

Sugar Grove is an unincorporated community located in Watauga County, North Carolina, United States. It is named after the sugar maples that grow in the area. The community is located along US 321, west of Vilas and Boone, along the banks of Cove Creek.

== History ==
Sugar Grove was founded in 1837, when John Mast opened the Sugar Grove Post Office; that year he reported a revenue of $14. During the Civil War, Company E of the 37th Confederate Regiment was organized September, 1861. Between 1864 and 1865, the home guard battalion of Watauga was stationed at Camp Mast, nearby Sugar Grove. On February 5, 1865, Camp Mast surrendered, by majority vote, after being surrounded at dawn by a battalion of around 100 Union soldiers, led by Captain James Champion, of Indiana; those who voted for surrender were quickly paroled and discharged. In 1915, the first cheese factory in the area was established in Sugar Grove (unknown when closed).

The Cove Creek High School, Ben Farthing Farm, and Ward Family House are listed on the National Register of Historic Places.

== Population ==
In 2023, the population estimate for ZIP Code 28679 was 2,535.

== See also ==
- Crossing Knob
- Watauga River
