= Westglow =

Historic house in North Carolina, United States

- U.S. National Register of Historic Places

- Location within North Carolina Location within the United States
- Location: W of Blowing Rock on U.S. 221, near Blowing Rock, North Carolina
- Coordinates: 36°8′17″N 81°42′50″W
- Area: 19.6 acres (7.9 ha)
- Built: 1917
- Architect: Hayes, Lee
- Architectural style: Colonial Revival
- NRHP reference No.: 79001762
- Added to NRHP: August 13, 1979

Westglow, also known as the Elliott Daingerfield House, is a historic home located near Blowing Rock, Watauga County, North Carolina. It was built in 1917, and is a 2 1/2-story, rectangular, Colonial Revival style frame dwelling with a hipped roof. It has a two-story hip roof extension. The front facade features a monumental tetrastyle portico supported by columns with Ionic order capitals. Also on the property are the contributing artists studio and caretaker's cottage (1920s). It was the summer home and studio of artist Elliot Daingerfield (1859-1932).

It was listed on the National Register of Historic Places in 1979.

Today, Westglow operates as a boutique luxury destination offering accommodations, dining, wellness services, and spa treatments. The property includes the historic Manor House, private lodge suites, luxury cottages, a full-service spa and salon, fitness facilities, and fine dining venues.
