= Bollinger-Hartley House =

Historic house in Blowing Rock, North Carolina

- U.S. National Register of Historic Places
- Location within North Carolina Location within the United States
- Location: 423 N. Main Street, Blowing Rock, North Carolina
- Coordinates: 36°8′19″N 81°40′13″W
- Area: 1.43 acres (0.58 ha)
- Built: 1914, c. 1935
- Built by: Bollinger, L.S.; Hartley, F.V., et al.
- Architectural style: Bungalow/Craftsman
- NRHP reference No.: 95000172
- Added to NRHP: March 9, 1995

The Bollinger-Hartley House is a historic house located at 423 North Main Street in Blowing Rock, Watauga County, North Carolina.

== Description and history ==
It was built in 1914, and is a 1 1/2-story, Bungalow/American Craftsman style frame dwelling. It rests on a stone foundation and has a full-width front porch and stone chimney. The house features native stone and chestnut, weatherboards, and wood shingles. Also on the property is a contributing stone cellar (c. 1933) and spring house / shop (c. 1920).

It was listed on the National Register of Historic Places on March 9, 1995.
