= Gragg House =

Historic house in North Carolina, United States

- U.S. National Register of Historic Places
- Location within North Carolina Location within the United States
- Location: On U.S. 221, near Blowing Rock, North Carolina
- Coordinates: 36°7′0″N 81°46′39″W
- Area: less than one acre
- NRHP reference No.: 73001382
- Added to NRHP: October 25, 1973

Gragg House is a historic home located near Blowing Rock, Watauga County, North Carolina. It dates back to the mid-19th century, and is a one-story, log dwelling. It has a saddle bag plan and features a central stone chimney. It has a two-room later addition which gives the house an L-shaped plan.

It was listed on the National Register of Historic Places in 1973.
