= Ben Farthing Farm =

Historic farm in North Carolina, United States

- U.S. National Register of Historic Places
- U.S. Historic district
- Location within North Carolina Location within the United States
- Location: NC 1121 (Rominger Rd.) W side, just N of Watauga R., near Sugar Grove, North Carolina
- Coordinates: 36°14′21″N 81°49′26″W
- Area: 16 acres (6.5 ha)
- Built: 1935
- Built by: Farthing, Ben; Hartley, Charles
- Architectural style: Bungalow/craftsman, Frame gambrel banked barn
- NRHP reference No.: 92001736
- Added to NRHP: January 4, 1993

Ben Farthing Farm is a historic farm and national historic district located near Sugar Grove, Watauga County, North Carolina. The complex includes a modest 1 1/2-story frame bungalow (1923), a large frame bank barn of traditional gambrel-roof form (1935), a root cellar built into a mountainside (1938), a frame outhouse (1938), and a frame scale house (1941). The buildings are set in a vernacular landscaping of native rock (1939).

It was listed on the National Register of Historic Places in 1993.
