= Green Park Inn =

- U.S. National Register of Historic Places
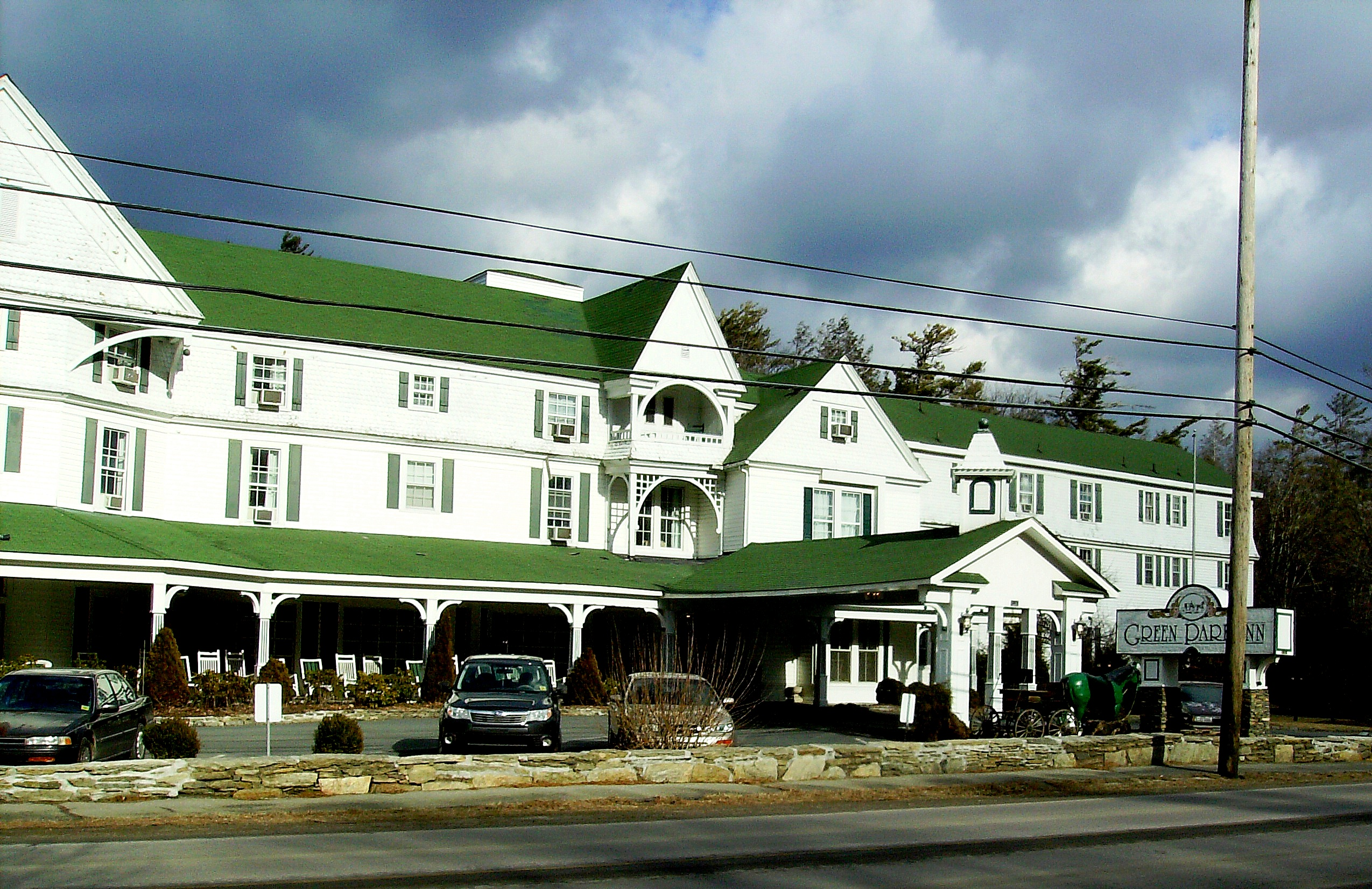

- Location within North Carolina Location within the United States
- Location: U.S. 321, Blowing Rock, North Carolina
- Coordinates: 36°7′7″N 81°39′39″W
- Area: 8.7 acres (3.5 ha)
- Built: 1882
- Architectural style: Colonial Revival, Queen Anne
- NRHP reference No.: 82004637
- Added to NRHP: June 03, 1982

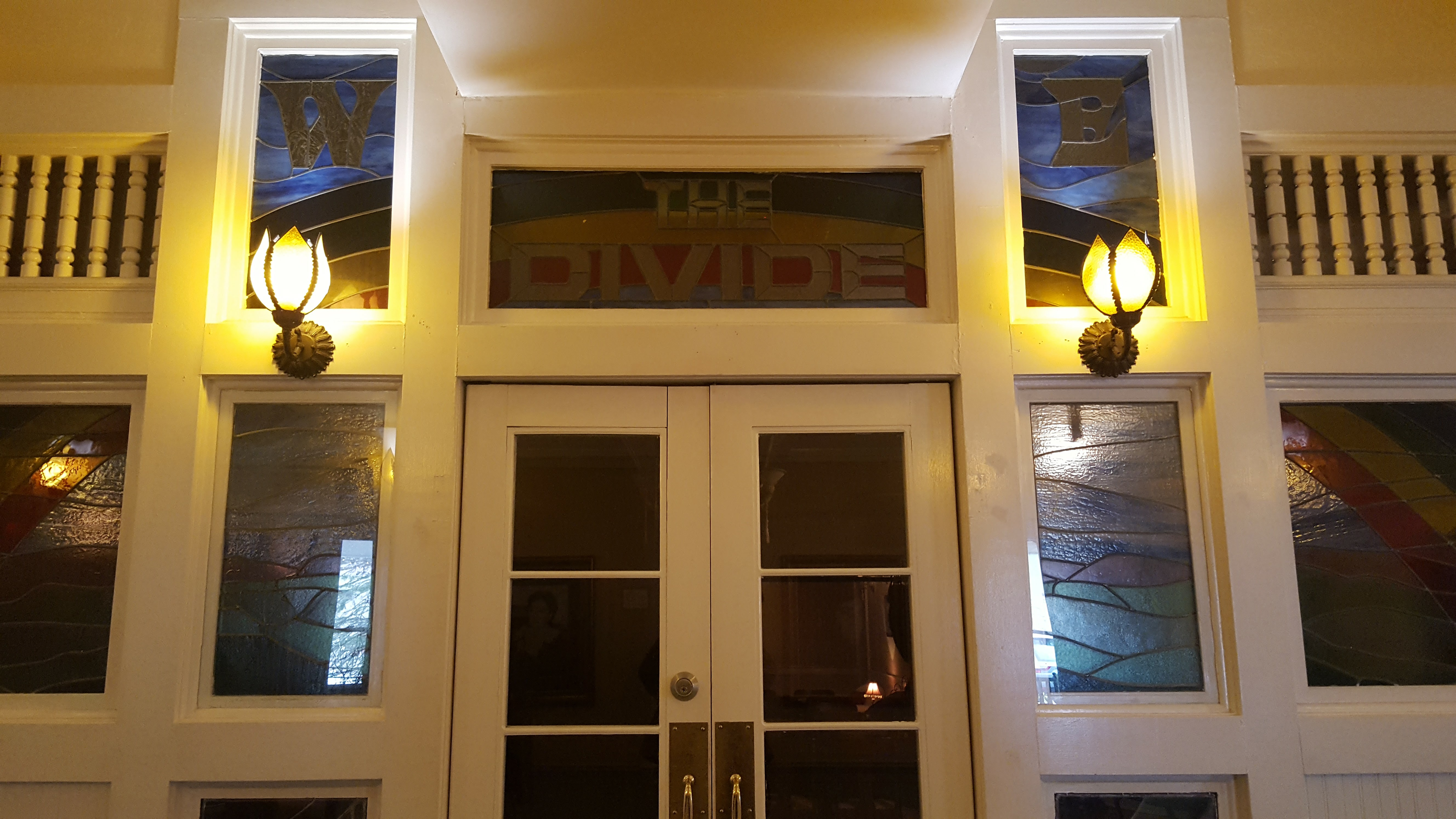
The Divide Tavern located on the Eastern Continental Divide inside the Green Park Inn, 2017

The Green Park Inn was a historic hotel located on the Eastern Continental Divide in Blowing Rock, North Carolina. The hotel was built in the 1880s and operated continuously until May 24, 2009, reopening after change of ownership and renovation on October 29, 2010.

The Green Park Inn was a member of Historic Hotels of America, the official program of the National Trust for Historic Preservation for recognizing and celebrating the finest historic hotels across America.

Past guests of the hotel have included John D. Rockefeller, Herbert Hoover, Annie Oakley, Calvin Coolidge, Eleanor Roosevelt and Margaret Mitchell among others. It was added to the National Register of Historic Places on June 3, 1982. It was located in the Green Park Historic District.

In the latter part of the Civil War a small fortification was built on the site of the Green Park by Federal Troops.

The hotel was purported to be haunted, and had played host over the years to several conventions of ghost hunters.

In the face of a difficult economy, the Green Park Inn was closed seeking a new buyer in 2009, and foreclosed later that year.

On March 31, 2010, The Green Park Inn was purchased by two New York real estate investors who were already the owners of a number of other hotel properties. The new owners worked extensively with the Blowing Rock Historical Society and the State Historic Preservation authority in order to the retain charm, character, and historical integrity of the property. Just off the Lobby is the History Room which recounts the Hotel's storied past and contains the original Green Park U.S. Post Office.

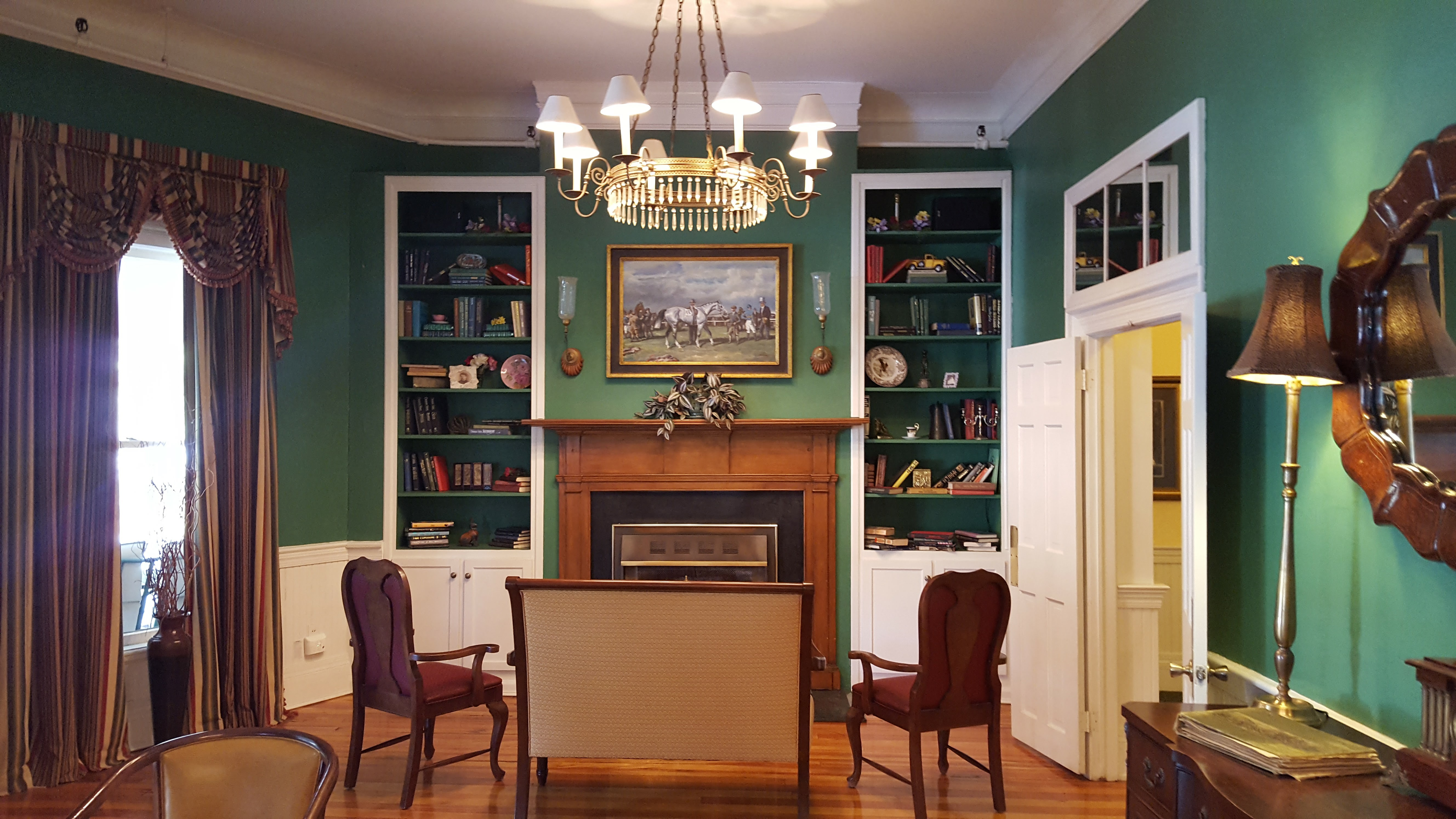

Following an aggressive renovation of the property, The Green Park Inn reopened to the public on October 29, 2010. During the refurnishing, the owners purchased only American made products.

On July 1, 2011, the Green Park Inn reopened the Laurel Room Restaurant (now named the Chestnut Grille, to hone the American Chestnut from which the hotel is primarily constructed) and the Divide Tavern (so named as it straddles the Eastern Continental Divide) following a gut renovation of the hotel's kitchen facilities. The new food and beverage operations was headed by James Beard award-winning Chef James Welch.

On October 29, 2011, the Green Park Inn celebrated its first anniversary of reopening after having a progressively successful year. In 2016, the hotel celebrated its 125th anniversary at a gala dinner and dance celebrating a milestone for the state's second oldest operating resort hotel and the last of the "Grand Manor" hotels still operating in western North Carolina. Included among the guests were descendants of two of the three hotels founders, the Bernhardt family and the Harper family.

In May 2025, the Green Park Inn has started to be demolished, with the owner stating they wished to build condos and a new forty room hotel on the site.
