= Green Park Historic District =

Historic district in North Carolina, United States

- U.S. National Register of Historic Places
- U.S. Historic district
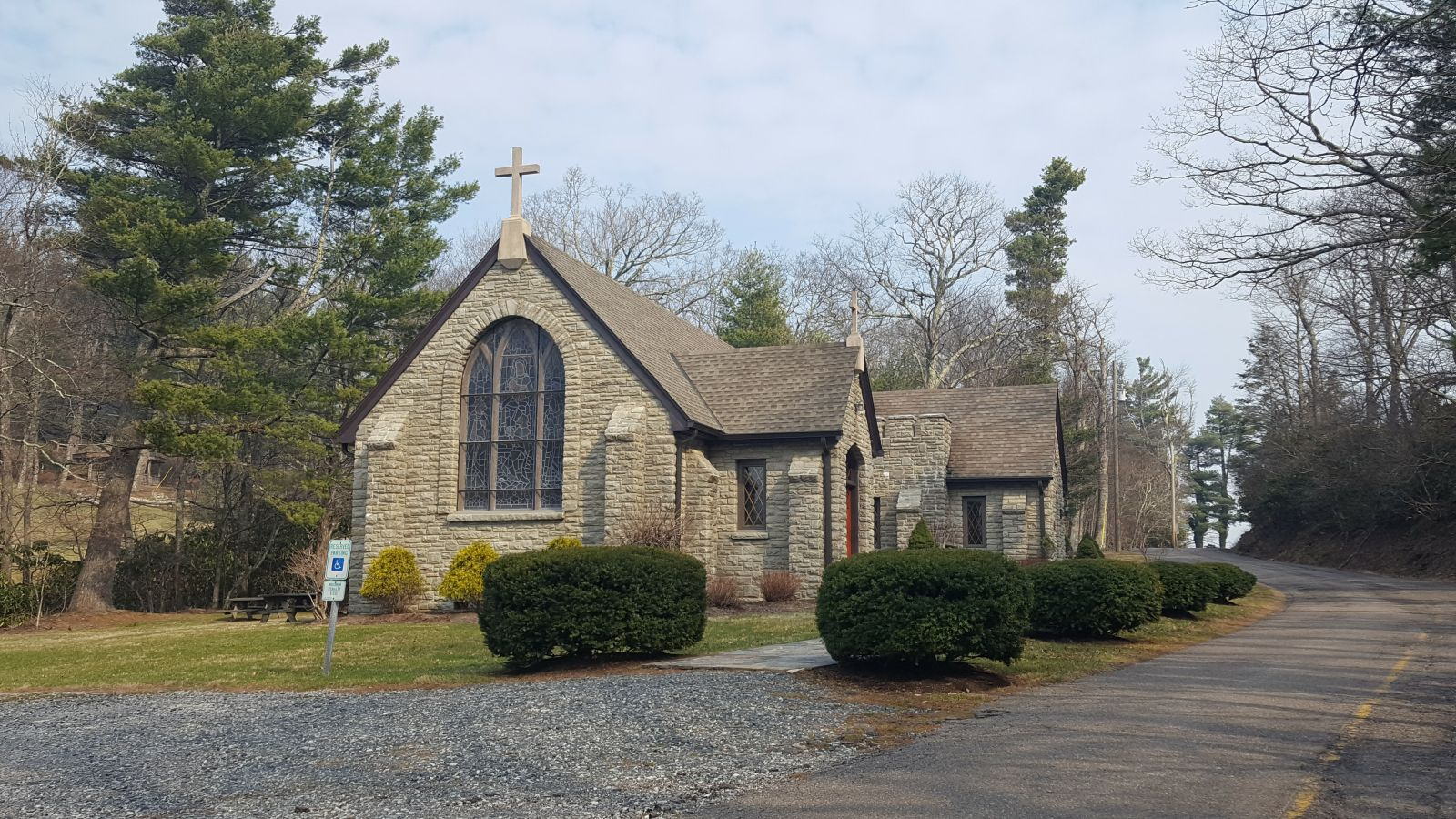
- Church of the Epiphany, 2017

- Location within North Carolina Location within the United States
- Location: Jct. of US 321 and Green Hill and Rock Rds., Blowing Rock, North Carolina
- Coordinates: 35°54′56″N 81°32′17″W
- Area: 177 acres (72 ha)
- Built: 1891
- Built by: multiple, including Lee Hayes, Charles Moody
- Architect: multiple, including Barnes & Champney
- Architectural style: Bungalow/craftsman, Colonial Revival, Queen Anne
- NRHP reference No.: 94001020
- Added to NRHP: August 19, 1994

Green Park Historic District is a national historic district located at Blowing Rock in Caldwell County and Watauga County, North Carolina, United States. The district includes 46 contributing buildings, three contributing sites, and two contributing structures associated with a residential summer resort in the town of Blowing Rock. It includes buildings largely built in the 1920s, in a variety of popular architectural styles including Bungalow / American Craftsman, Colonial Revival and Queen Anne. Notable contributing resources include the McDowell Cottage, Mt. Bethel Reformed Church, Blowing Rock Reception Center/Gift Shop, Robert A. Dunn Cottage, Gideon's Ridge, the James Ross Cannon House, the David Ovens Cottage, Blowing Rock, and the Blowing Rock Country Club Golf Course. Located in the district and separately listed is the Green Park Inn (1891).

The district was listed on the National Register of Historic Places in 1994.

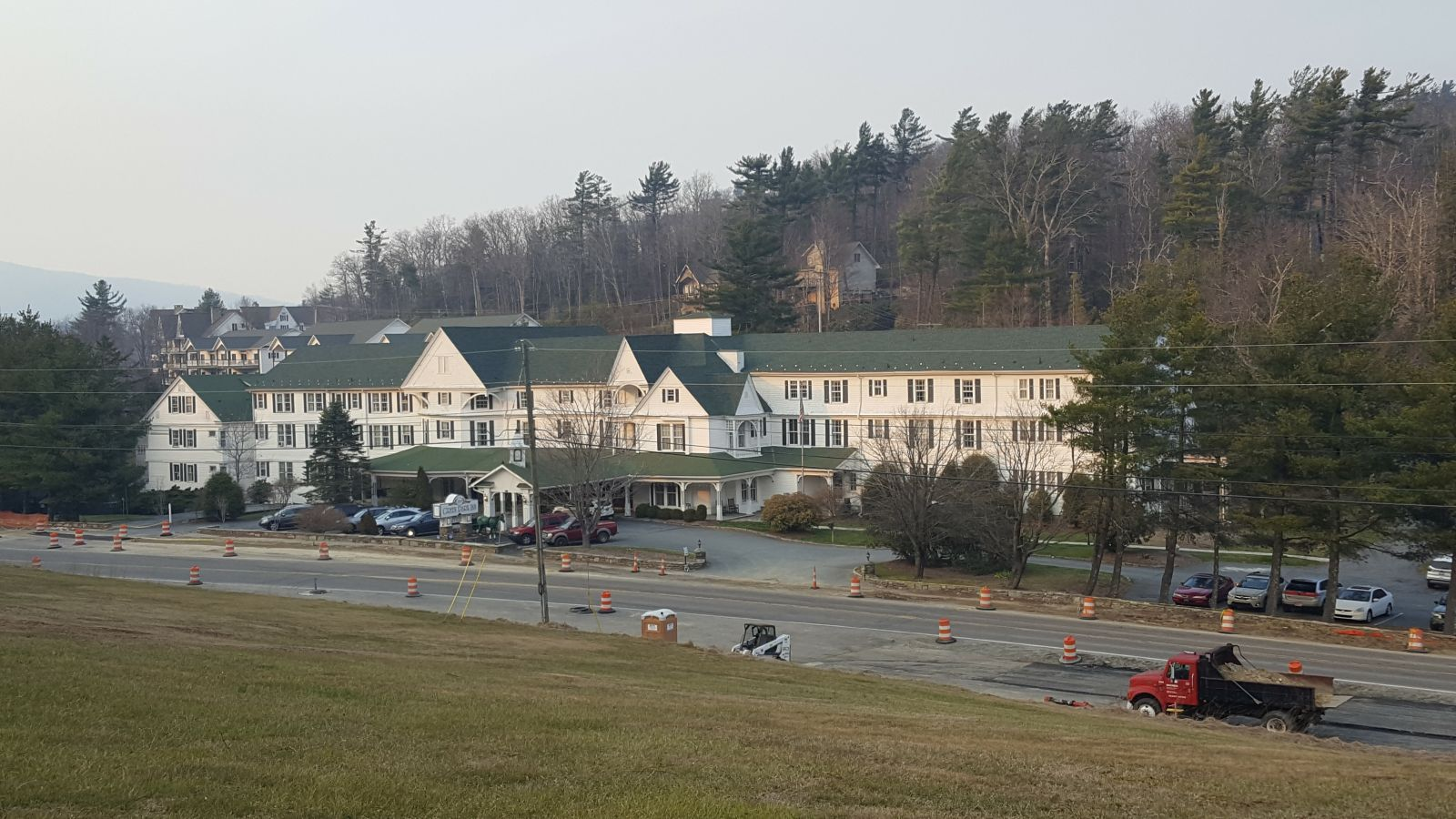
The Green Park Inn, 2017
