= Blair Farm =

Historic farm in North Carolina, United States

- U.S. National Register of Historic Places
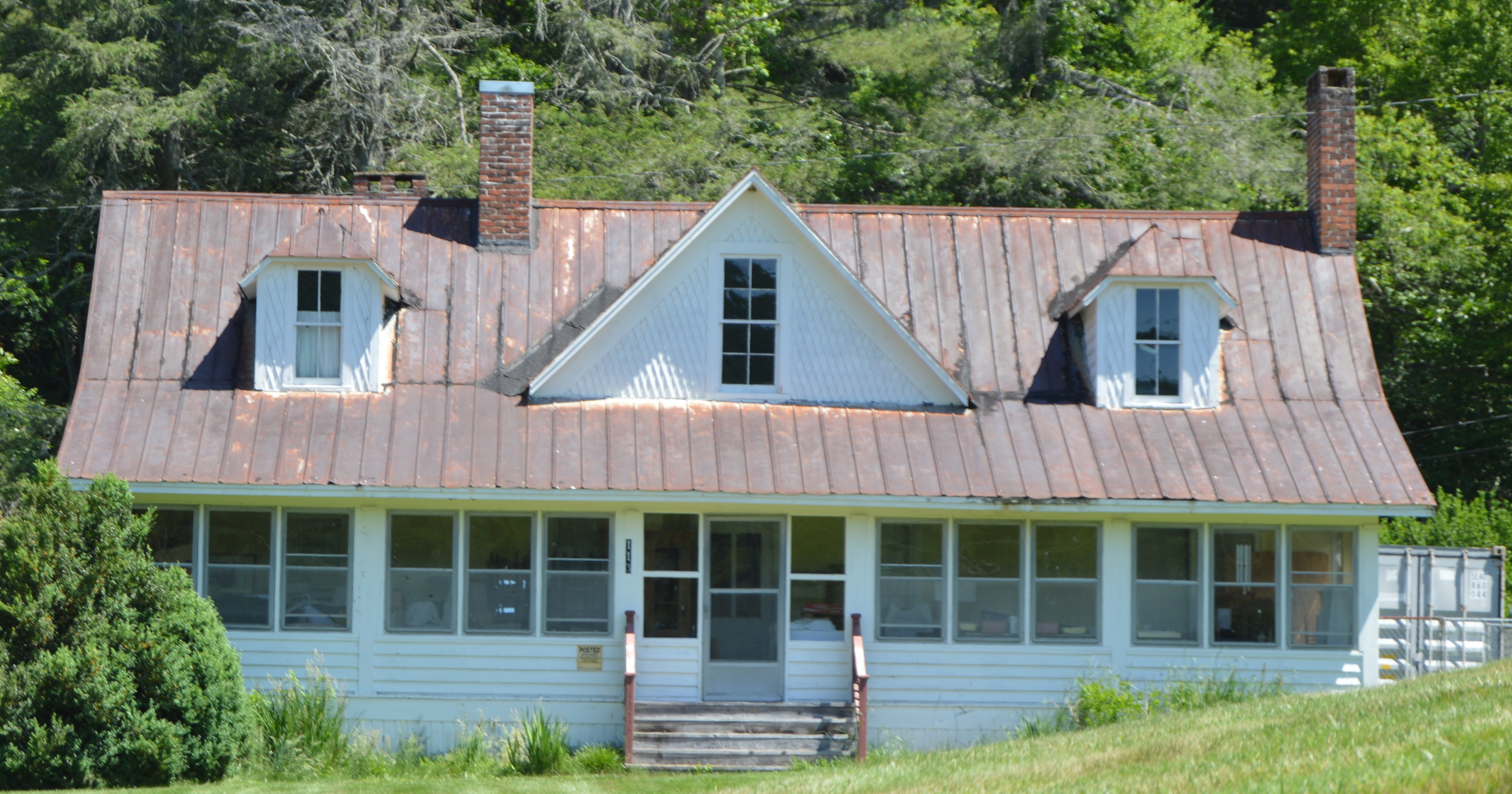
- Front of the farmhouse

- Location within North Carolina Location within the United States
- Location: N. side of VA 1522 just W. of its jct. with Blairmont Dr., near Boone, North Carolina
- Coordinates: 36°12′10″N 81°38′54″W
- Area: 9.1 acres (3.7 ha)
- Built: 1844
- Architectural style: Mid 19th Century Revival, Hall-parlor house
- NRHP reference No.: 08000812
- Added to NRHP: August 29, 2008

Blair Farm is a historic farm located near Boone, Watauga County, North Carolina, United States. The original section of the Blair House was built in 1844, with additions and modifications made in the 1850s, 1880s, about 1900, 1938, and in the late 1950s-early 1960s. It is a 1½-story single-pile, side-gable-roofed, timber-frame dwelling with a full-height rear-gabled ell. Other contributing buildings are a granary / wood shed and carriage house. The house is the oldest of only a few 19th-century buildings remaining in Boone.

It was listed on the National Register of Historic Places in 2008.
