= Blowing Rock, North Carolina =

- Town
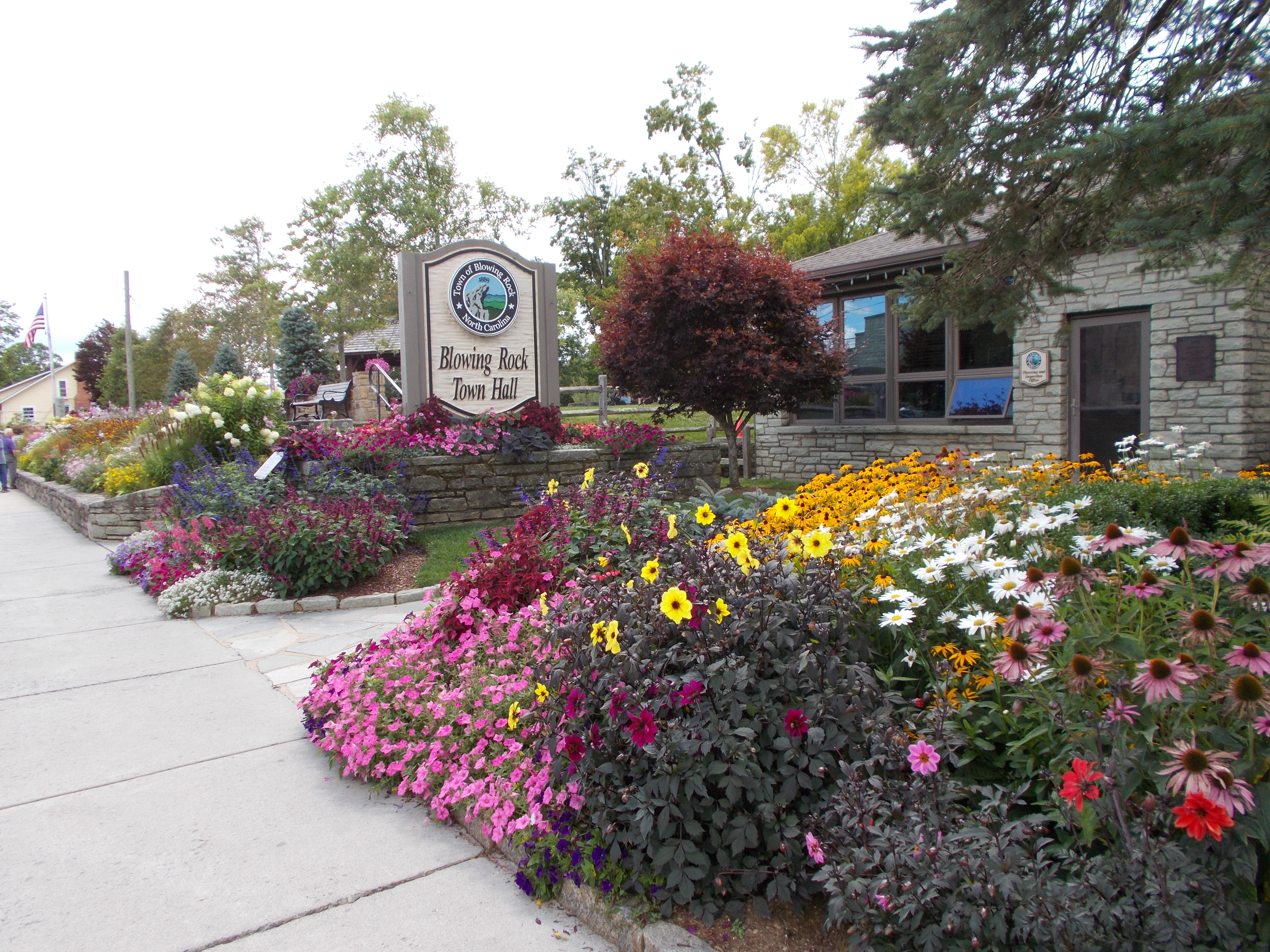
- Town hall

- Flag Seal
- Nickname: The Crown of the Blue Ridge
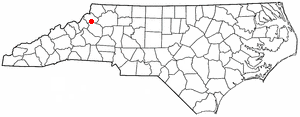
- Location of Blowing Rock, North Carolina
- Coordinates: 36°07′47″N 81°40′14″W
- Country: United States
- State: North Carolina
- Counties: Watauga, Caldwell

Government
  - Type: Council-Manager
  - Mayor: Charlie Sellers

Area
  - Total: 3.29 sq mi (8.51 km^{2})
  - Land: 3.24 sq mi (8.40 km^{2})
  - Water: 0.042 sq mi (0.11 km^{2})
- Elevation: 3,517 ft (1,072 m)

Population (2020)
  - Total: 1,376
  - Density: 424.4/sq mi (163.88/km^{2})
- Time zone: UTC-5 (Eastern (EST))
  - Summer (DST): UTC-4 (EDT)
- ZIP code: 28605
- Area code: 828
- FIPS code: 37-06500
- GNIS feature ID: 2405281
- Website: www.townofblowingrocknc.gov

Blowing Rock is a town in Watauga and Caldwell counties in the U.S. state of North Carolina. The population was 1,376 at the 2020 census.

The Caldwell County portion of Blowing Rock is part of the Hickory–Lenoir–Morganton Metropolitan Statistical Area, while the Watauga County portion is part of the Boone Micropolitan Statistical Area.

== History ==
Before 1752, when Bishop August Gottlieb Spangenberg of the Moravian Church visited the Blowing Rock, the windy cliffs of the area were home to the Cherokee and the Catawba Native American tribes.

After the mid-18th century, when hardy Scots-Irish pioneers began to settle in the region, the mountain passes from southern Virginia into Kentucky attracted many colonists, farmers, hunters, and trappers who continued south to the mountains of North Carolina. The first family to settle in Blowing Rock were the Greenes, who were established by the mid-19th century on a site that would become the Green Park Hotel property.

In addition to the Green Park Inn, the Bollinger-Hartley House, East Tennessee and Western North Carolina Railroad Locomotive No. 12, Gragg House, Green Park Historic District, Randall Memorial Building, Former, Vardell Family Cottages Historic District, Westglow, and Moses Cone's Flat Top Manor are listed on the National Register of Historic Places.

Saint Elizabeth Catholic Church (Boone, NC), operates the Church of the Epiphany as a seasonal, mission church in Blowing Rock.

== Geography ==
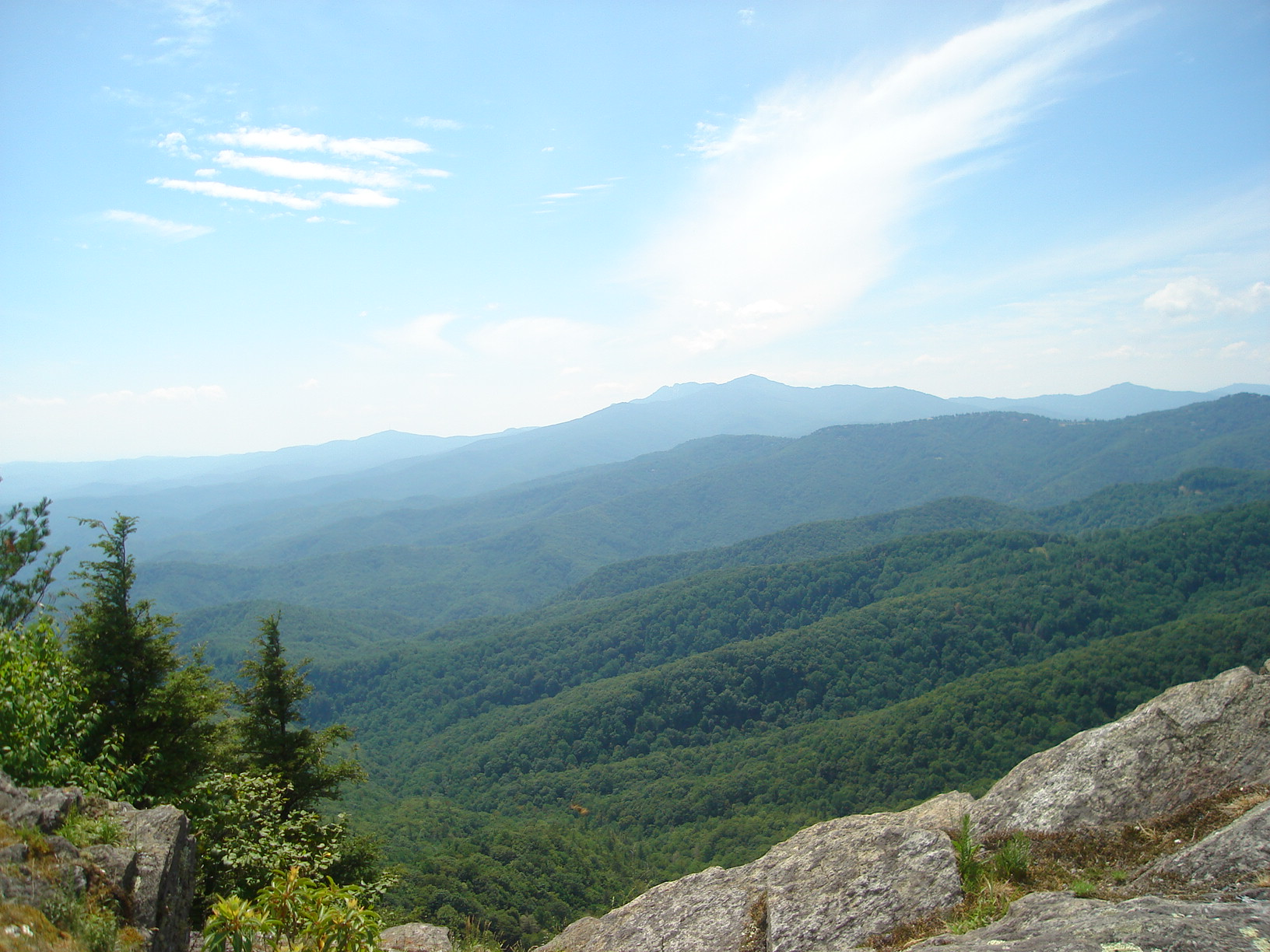
The rocky outcropping of Blowing Rock

Blowing Rock is located in southern Watauga County in the Blue Ridge Mountains. The southernmost portion of the town, including the actual Blowing Rock cliff, is located in Caldwell County.

The town is located on the crest of the Blue Ridge. Most of the town lies just north of the crest, with waters draining north to the Middle Fork of the New River and thence to the Ohio River valley, while to the south of the ridgecrest, waters flow via the Johns River to the Catawba River valley and eventually to the Atlantic Ocean in South Carolina.

According to the United States Census Bureau, the town has a total area of 3.1 square miles (7.9 km^{2}), of which 3.0 square miles (7.7 km^{2}) of the area is land, and 0.04 square miles (0.1 km^{2}), or 1.49% of the total area, is water.

=== Climate ===
The climate in the area can be described as warm-summer humid continental (Dfb), or highland subtropical climate (Cfb) depending on the isotherm used; Köppen Climate Classification. This results in an unusual climate compared to the rest of North Carolina; the town's elevation of 3,500 to 3,600 feet (1,100 to 1,100 m) above sea level results in cooler summer temperatures than lowland areas to the east and south. Daytime temperatures in the summer infrequently rise above 80 °F (27 °C). Temperatures in the winter are much colder and harsher than what would be expected in a southern state, being more similar to southern coastal New England. Daytime highs can frequently fall into the 20s or lower. Snow, sleet, and freezing rain are all common in the winter months. Springtime and Autumn in Blowing Rock are both cool and generally pleasant.

The biggest 24-hour temperature change recorded in North Carolina was recorded at Blowing Rock on 1 January 1979, yielding a temperature range of 63 degrees, from −8 °F to 55 °F.

Climate data for BLOWING ROCK 1NW, NC, 1991-2020 normals
Month	Jan	Feb	Mar	Apr	May	Jun	Jul	Aug	Sep	Oct	Nov	Dec	Year
Mean daily maximum °F (°C)	38.7 (3.7)	42.4 (5.8)	49.9 (9.9)	59.9 (15.5)	66.5 (19.2)	72.8 (22.7)	77.1 (25.1)	74.8 (23.8)	70.0 (21.1)	60.1 (15.6)	50.9 (10.5)	42.4 (5.8)	58.8 (14.9)
Daily mean °F (°C)	29.9 (−1.2)	33.3 (0.7)	40.0 (4.4)	50.0 (10.0)	57.3 (14.1)	64.0 (17.8)	68.4 (20.2)	66.6 (19.2)	61.4 (16.3)	51.3 (10.7)	41.6 (5.3)	34.1 (1.2)	49.8 (9.9)
Mean daily minimum °F (°C)	21.0 (−6.1)	24.2 (−4.3)	30.2 (−1.0)	40.1 (4.5)	48.2 (9.0)	55.1 (12.8)	59.7 (15.4)	58.4 (14.7)	52.8 (11.6)	42.5 (5.8)	32.2 (0.1)	25.8 (−3.4)	40.9 (4.9)
Average precipitation inches (mm)	5.11 (130)	4.08 (104)	5.04 (128)	5.80 (147)	6.08 (154)	5.56 (141)	5.59 (142)	6.48 (165)	6.89 (175)	5.01 (127)	4.44 (113)	6.41 (163)	66.49 (1,689)
Source: NOAA

== Demographics ==
Historical population
Census	Pop.	Note	%±
1900	331		—
1910	261		−21.1%
1920	338		29.5%
1930	503		48.8%
1940	654		30.0%
1950	661		1.1%
1960	711		7.6%
1970	801		12.7%
1980	1,337		66.9%
1990	1,257		−6.0%
2000	1,418		12.8%
2010	1,241		−12.5%
2020	1,376		10.9%
U.S. Decennial Census

=== 2020 census ===
Blowing Rock racial composition
Race	Number	Percentage
White (non-Hispanic)	1,291	93.82%
Black or African American (non-Hispanic)	3	0.22%
Native American	1	0.07%
Asian	10	0.73%
Other/Mixed	38	2.76%
Hispanic or Latino	33	2.4%

As of the 2020 United States census, there were 1,376 people, 619 households, and 357 families residing in the town.

=== 2000 census ===
As of the census of 2000, there were 1,418 people, 663 households, and 387 families residing in the town. The population density was 477.9 inhabitants per square mile (184.5/km^{2}). There were 1,524 housing units at an average density of 513.6 units per square mile (198.3 units/km^{2}). The racial makeup of the town was 97.95% White, 0.35% African American, 0.21% Native American, 0.35% Asian, 0.07% from other races, and 1.06% from two or more races. Hispanic or Latino of any race were 0.63% of the population.

There were 663 households, of which

- 16.9% had children under the age of 18 living with them,
- 52.3% were married couples living together,
- 4.5% had a female householder with no husband present, and
- 41.5% were non-families.

35.4% of all households were made up of individuals, and 14.6% had someone living alone who was 65 years of age or older. The average household size was 2.03 persons and the average family size was 2.59.

The population consists of

- 15.0% under the age of 18,
- 4.9% from 18 to 24,
- 20.0% from 25 to 44,
- 34.1% from 45 to 64, and
- 26.0% 65 years or older.

The median age was 51 years. For every 100 females, there were 86.8 males. For every 100 females age 18 and over, there were 80.4 males.

The median income for a household in the town was $54,271, and the median income for a family was $66,979. Males had a median income of $45,417 compared to $27,361 for females. The per capita income for the town was $34,294. About 2.9% of families and 9.1% of the population were below the poverty line, including 16.1% of those under age 18 and 6.5% of those age 65 or over.

== Attractions ==
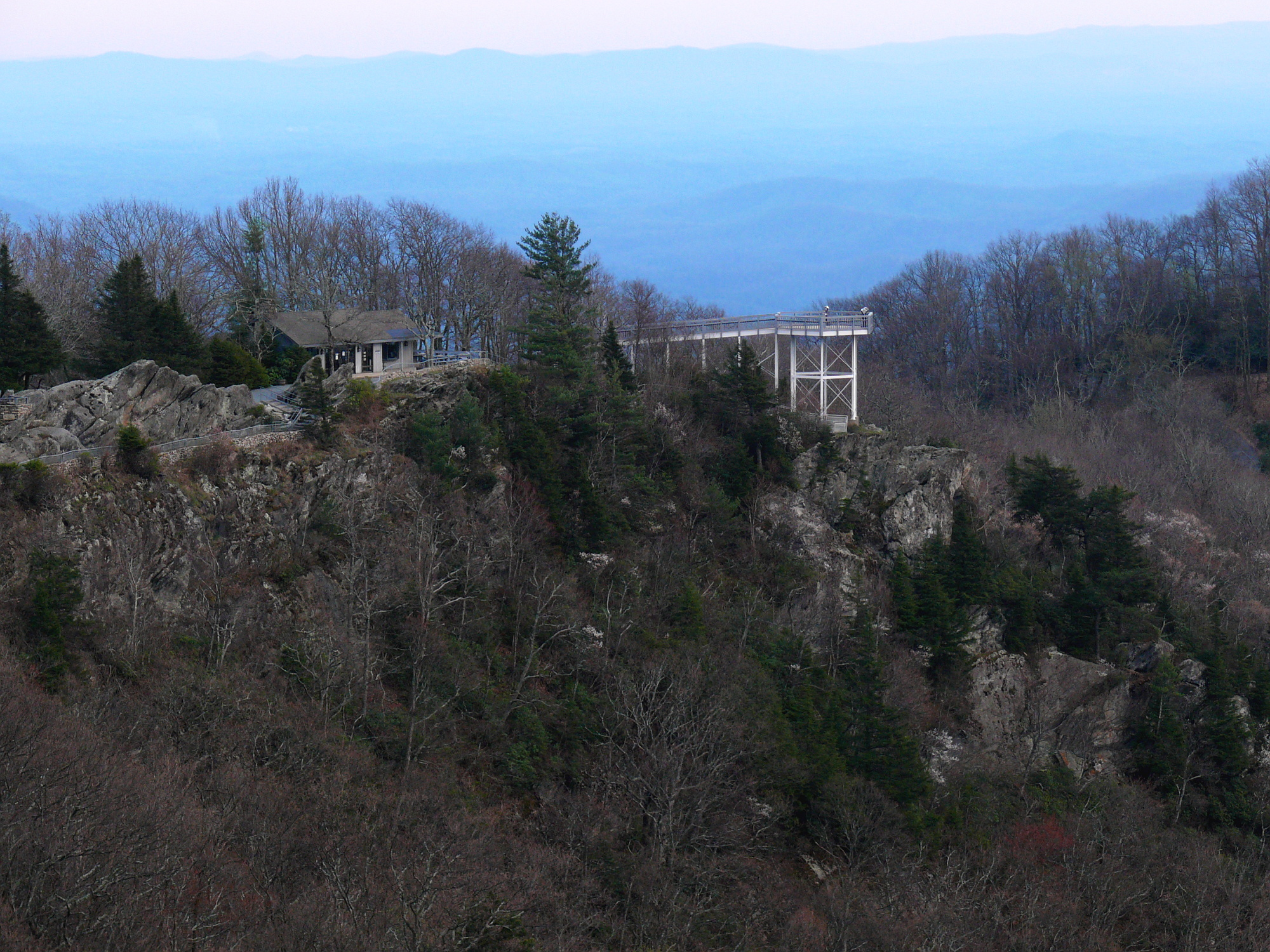
The observation deck at the Blowing Rock

The town of Blowing Rock takes its name from an unusual rock formation which juts over 1,500 feet (460 m) above the Johns River gorge. Due to the rock's shape and size, wind currents from the gorge often blow vertically, causing light objects to float upwards into the sky.

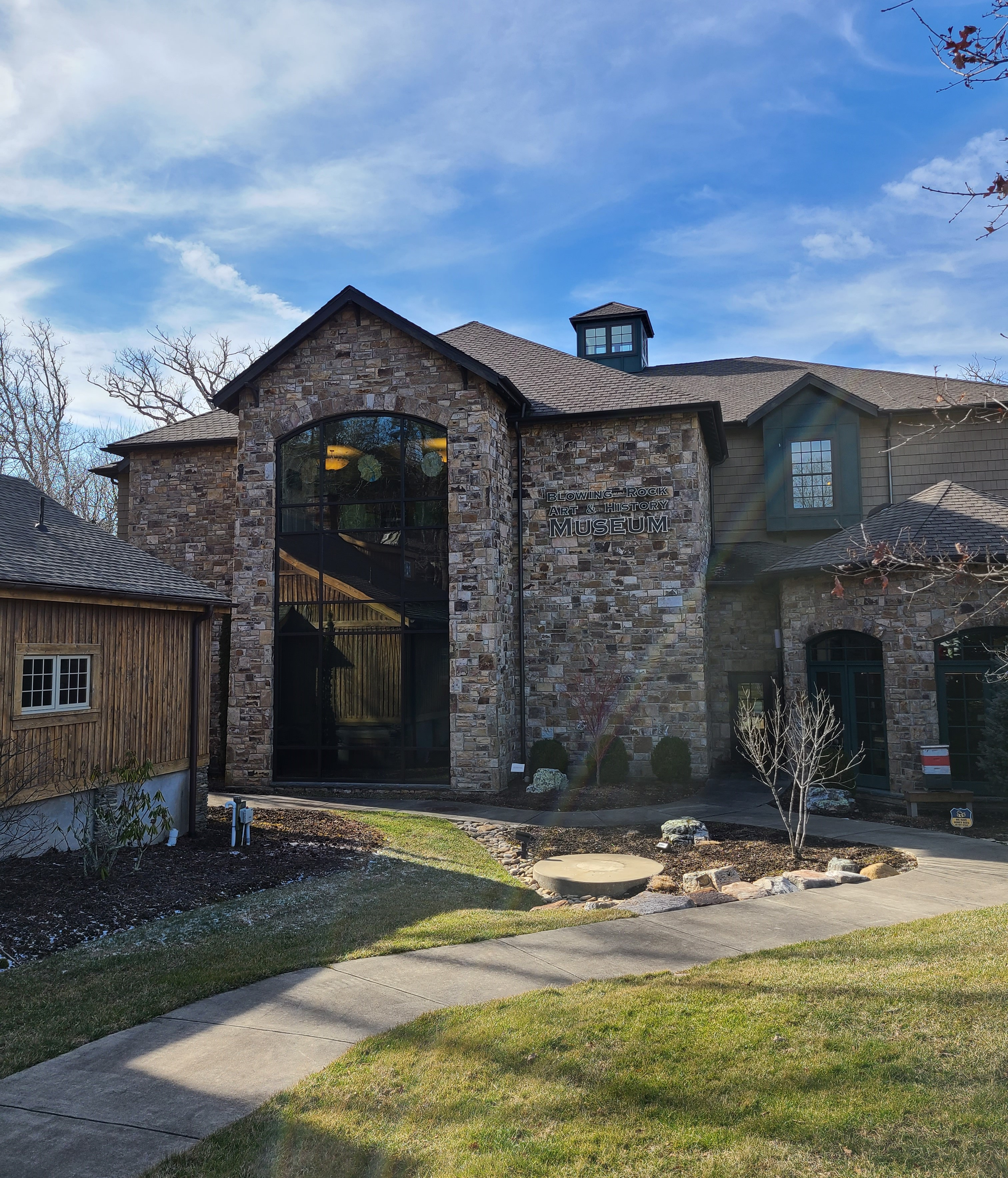
Blowing Rock Art & History Museum (BRAHM)

Blowing Rock is the site of Glen Burney Falls and Glen Marie Falls. The Glen Burney Trail was originally a Native American hunting trail which follows New Year's Creek to the falls overlooks. The trail also served as access to early 1900s logging camps.

The Blowing Rock area was once fought over by the Cherokee and Catawba Native American tribes. According to legend, two lovers - one from each tribe - were walking near the rocks when the man received a notice to report to his village and go into battle. When his lover urged him to stay with her, he became so distraught that he threw himself off the blowing rock into the gorge. The woman prayed to the Great Spirit to return her lover, and the Spirit complied by sending a gust of wind which blew the man back up the cliff and landed him safely on the blowing rock itself. This story of course is fictional but it was used as a draw for the attraction. In the 1980s, a billboard in Wilkesboro for Blowing Rock showed two Indians holding hands, one standing on the rock and one "floating". Today "The Blowing Rock" is a tourist attraction and is known for its superb views of the surrounding Blue Ridge Mountains.

On the nearby Blue Ridge Parkway is Moses Cone Memorial Park, which offers views of the surrounding mountains. The park contains the Moses Cone Manor and Estate, and features two lakes surrounded by forests and trails.

Annual festivals and events in Blowing Rock include the "Art in the Park" festival, a monthly summertime (May-Oct) event in downtown Blowing Rock; the Fourth of July festival and parade; Blowing Rock Winterfest in November; the Blue Ridge Wine and Food Festival in April; Christmas in the Park and Lighting of the Town festivities, including a Holiday Parade; the Symphony by the Lake at Chetola Resort; and the Blowing Rock Charity Horse Show.

== Media ==
The Blowing Rocket newspaper covers Blowing Rock. The newspaper is owned by Adams Publishing Group and is a sister publication of the Watauga Democrat in Boone.

Blowing Rock News is a digital-only news publication focused on Blowing Rock and its surrounding communities.

== Infrastructure ==
Most services are available either in Blowing Rock or in Boone, approximately 8 miles (13 km) away. The town is served by U.S. Highways 221 and 321 as well as the Blue Ridge Parkway. US 221 leads southwest 18 miles (29 km) to Linville and 53 miles (85 km) to Marion. US 321 leads southeast 21 miles (34 km) to Lenoir and 37 miles (60 km) to Hickory. The two highways together lead north to Boone.

For other transportation facilities, consult Boone, North Carolina and Watauga County, North Carolina.

== Notable people ==
- Deanna Ballard, member of the North Carolina Senate
- Thomas H. Buxton, academic
- Tristin Colley, long-distance runner
- Tom Robbins, author, recounted some early memories of Blowing Rock in Wild Ducks Flying Backward and in his 2014 "memoir" Tibetan Peach Pie
- Christopher Seitz, Old Testament scholar and theologian
- Cullie Tarleton, businessman and politician
- Harry Foster Welch, radio and voice actor, best known for portraying the voice of Popeye in cartoons
- Daniel Winkler, custom knife maker based in Blowing Rock
- Greg Bovino, U.S. Border Patrol commander, grew up in Blowing Rock and attended Western Carolina University

== See also ==
- Blowing Rock (land feature)
