= Elk Knob State Park =

State park in North Carolina, United States

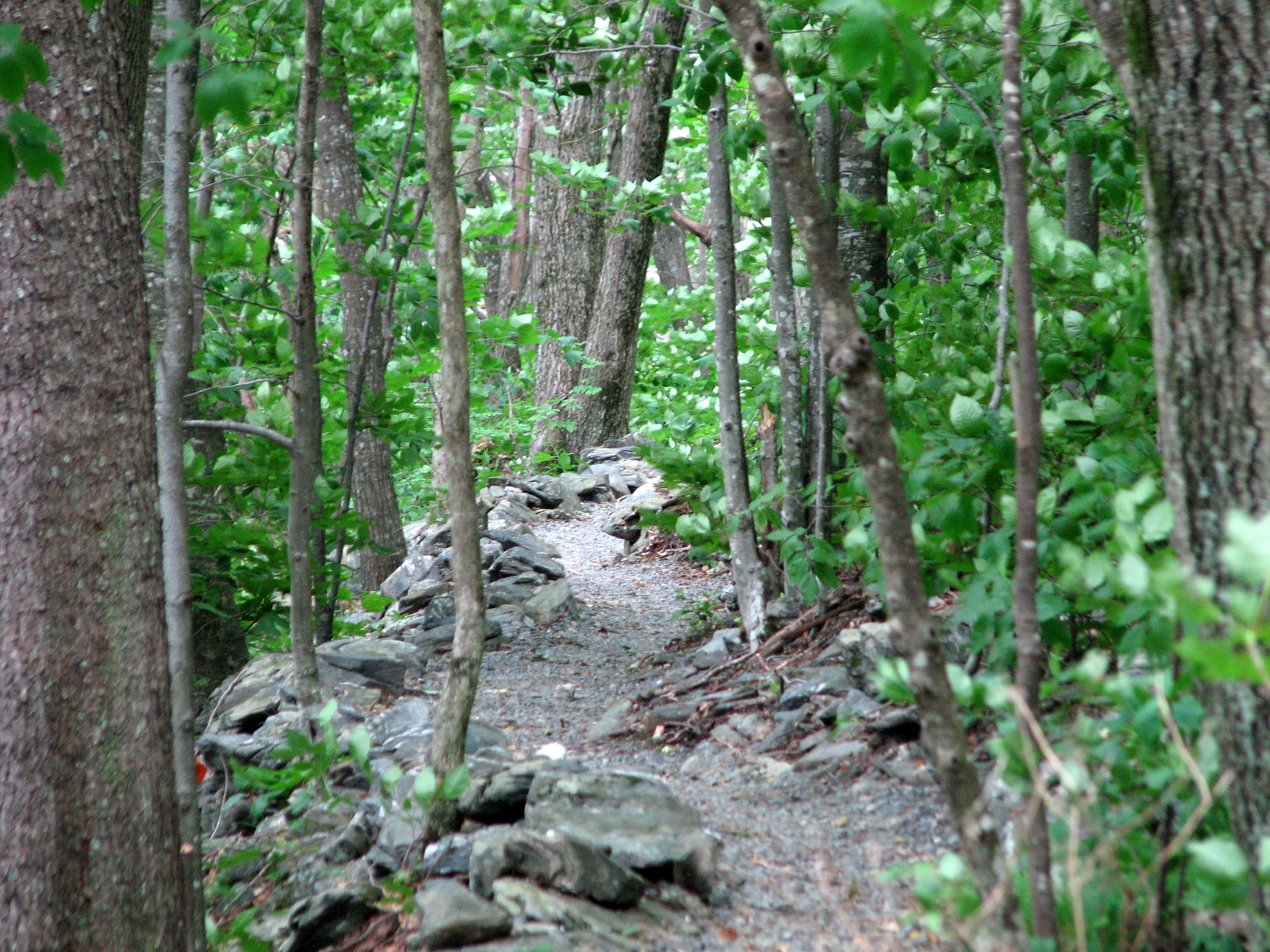

- Location within North Carolina Location within the United States
- Interactive map of Elk Knob State Park
- Location: Watauga County, North Carolina, United States
- Coordinates: 36°19′57″N 81°41′26″W
- Area: 4,423 acres (1,790 ha)
- Elevation: 5,520 ft (1,680 m)
- Established: 2003 (23 years ago)
- Administrator: North Carolina Division of Parks and Recreation
- Website: Official website

Elk Knob State Park is a 4,423-acre (17.90 km^{2}) North Carolina state park in Watauga County, North Carolina, in the United States. Opened in 2003, it is one of North Carolina's newest state parks. Elk Knob State Park was established to preserve the natural state of Elk Knob, the third highest peak in Watauga County. The park is open for year-round recreation and is currently undergoing an expansion of facilities to provide more recreational opportunities to visitors. Elk Knob State Park is on Meat Camp Road, 5.5 miles (8.9 km) from North Carolina Highway 194, 9.5 miles (15.3 km) north of Boone, in the Blue Ridge Mountains.

== History ==
Elk Knob State Park is named for Elk Knob, the third highest peak in Watauga County, which was under threat of being developed for summer homes during the late 1990s and early 2000s. A group of concerned locals, led by the Nature Conservancy and land owners, teamed together to purchase Elk Knob and deed it to the State of North Carolina as a nature preserve, and later a state park. Elk Knob is an amphibolite peak and is home to the headwaters of the North Fork New River, a tributary of the New River, one of the oldest rivers in the world.

Elk Knob State Park is surrounded by several historic mountain communities. Meat Camp, Pottertown and Sutherland were once, according to Dr. Patricia Beaver of Appalachian State University, "bustling, dynamic communities". Meat Camp was the location of Winebarger Grist Mill, which operated from the 1850s until 2005. Sutherland had a thriving cattle industry. Each community had at least one general store, post office, school and church. Faculty and students from Appalachian State have begun a process of preserving the history of the communities by hosting periodic community days, at Elk Knob State Park, where residents of the shrinking communities gather to pass down their history and share photos of earlier days. These gatherings have also given the students and young people of the region a chance to learn about sustainable agriculture practices that were commonplace throughout the history of Elk Knob.

== Ecology ==
Elk Knob State Park's location atop an amphibolite peak has made it an ecologically unique area. Amphibolite is a dark metamorphic rock which is rich in nutrients and supports the growth of rare plants. Elk Knob and Rittle Knob, which are now part of Elk Knob State Park, are ecologically rich sites that host diverse and rare plant species such as Gray's lily, rattlesnake root, flame azalea, purple fringed orchid and trailing wolfsbane.

Northern hardwood forests grow at Elk Knob State Park. This type of forest consists of sugar maple, American beech, yellow buckeye and yellow birch trees. The trees that grow near the summits of Rittle and Elk Knobs have been stunted by the low temperatures, high elevation and high winds. Trees that are just a few feet high can be well over one hundred years old.

The forests of Elk Knob State Park provide a habitat for a number of woodland species including a breeding colony of ravens, the American black bear, bobcat, white-tailed deer, and wild turkeys. Since the park is largely undeveloped, these species have lived in an environment that has been largely left undisturbed by humans. Any development at the park has left minimal ecological damage.

== Recreation ==
Elk Knob State Park is one of the newest state parks in North Carolina. Recreational opportunities are limited since the facilities at the park have not yet been fully built, and they will remain somewhat limited since one of the original goals of the park is to maintain it as a natural area.

An old road that leads to the summit of Elk Knob served as the park's initial hiking trail, but it is steep and rocky, making it a difficult hike. A less steep and easier to ascend hiking trail was constructed with the help of volunteers, and it was finished September 4, 2011. The old road is planned to be formally closed to hiking, so the process of secondary succession will be encouraged on the road bed. Upon reaching the summit hikers can view Mount Jefferson, Grandfather Mountain, Mount Mitchell, Snake Mountain, and various peaks in Tennessee and Virginia.

In the fall of 2012, the park opened up a back-country camping area for backpackers. The camping area consists of 3 individual sites, two group sites, and a "zone camping area", where up to three sites may be established by backpackers. No campfires are permitted, and campers must use bear canisters. The park has allowed limited front-country camping during the weekend of the National Wildlife Federation's Great American Backyard Campout.
