= Rich Mountain Bald (Watauga County, North Carolina) =

Mountain in North Carolina, United States

- Location within North Carolina

Highest point
- Elevation: 5,361 ft (1,634 m)
- Prominence: 932 feet (284 m)
- Coordinates: 36°18′44″N 81°43′00″W

Geography
- Location: Watauga County, North Carolina, U.S.
- Parent range: Blue Ridge Mountains
- Topo map: USGS Zionville

Rich Mountain Bald (variant: Bald of Rich Mountain and Big Bald of Rich) is a mountain in the North Carolina High Country, southeast of the community of Zionville. Its elevation reaches 5,361 feet (1,634 m).

The mountain generates several feeder streams to the South Fork New River (via Meat Camp Creek) and Watauga River (via Cove Creek). Rich Mountain Gap separates it with Snake Mountain.
