= Elk Knob (Watauga County, North Carolina) =

Mountain in North Carolina, United States

- Location within North Carolina

Highest point
- Elevation: 5,538 ft (1,688 m)
- Prominence: 1,000 feet (305 m)
- Coordinates: 36°19′38″N 81°40′36″W

Geography
- Location: Watauga County, North Carolina, U.S.
- Parent range: Blue Ridge Mountains
- Topo map: USGS Zionville

Elk Knob is a mountain in the North Carolina High Country, north of the community of Meat Camp. Its elevation reaches 5,538 feet (1,688 m).

The mountain is the headwaters of the North Fork New River and feeder creeks to the South Fork New River (via Meat Camp Creek). The mountain is home to Elk Knob State Park. Elk Knob is partially formed by amphibolites of the Ashe Metamorphic Suite and Alligator Back Metamorphic suite.
