= Elk Knob =

Elk Knob may refer to:

In geography:

- Elk Knob (California)
- Elk Knob (Garfield County, Colorado)
- Elk Knob (Gunnison County, Colorado)
- Elk Knob (Alleghany County, North Carolina)
- Elk Knob (Watauga County, North Carolina)
- Elk Knob (Pennsylvania)
- Elk Knob (South Dakota)
- Elk Knob (Lee County, Virginia)
- Elk Knob (Wise County, Virginia)
- Elk Knob (Monroe County, West Virginia)
- Elk Knob (Summers County, West Virginia)

May also refer to:

- Elk Knob State Park, a state park in North Carolina
