= Aho, North Carolina =

Aho
- Unincorporated community
- Location within the state of North Carolina Aho (the United States)
- Coordinates: 36°09′33″N 81°36′59″W
- Country: United States
- State: North Carolina
- County: Watauga
- Elevation: 3,763 ft (1,147 m)
- Time zone: UTC-5 (Eastern (EST))
  - Summer (DST): UTC-4 (EDT)
- ZIP code: 28605
- Area code: 828
- GNIS feature ID: 1018776

Aho (/ˈeɪˈhoʊ/ AY-hoh) is an unincorporated community located in Watauga County, North Carolina, United States. Possibly named after the Aho Branch that flows nearby, the community is located along the Blue Ridge Parkway at Bentley Knob, northeast of Blowing Rock.
