= Snake Mountain (North Carolina – Tennessee) =

Mountain in United States of America

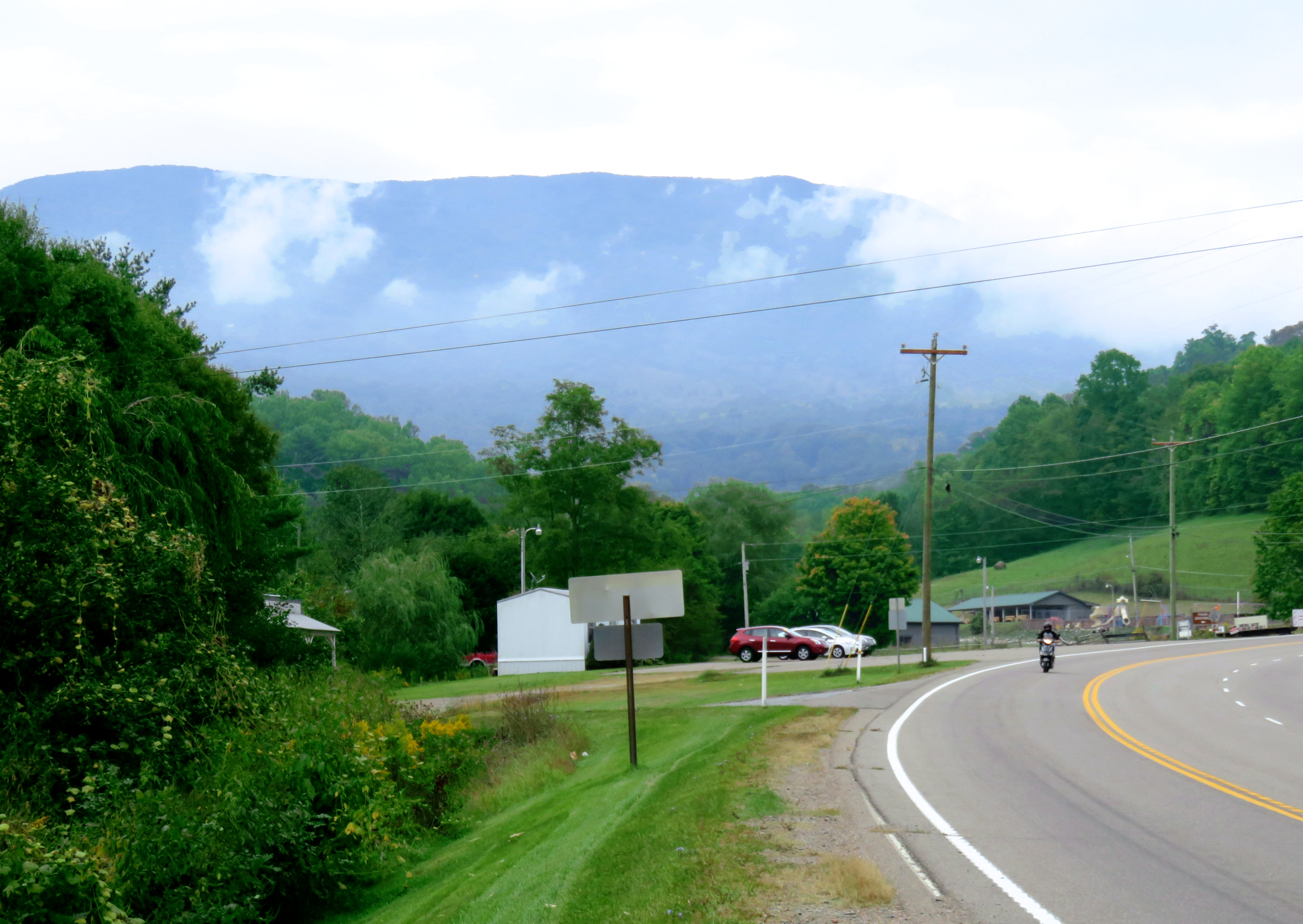
- Snake Mountain, viewed from Trade, Tennessee

Highest point
- Elevation: 5,564 ft (1,696 m)
- Prominence: 2,240 ft (680 m)
- Coordinates: 36°19′52″N 81°42′27″W

Geography
- Location within North Carolina
- Location: Watauga County, North Carolina, U.S.
- Parent range: Blue Ridge Mountains
- Topo map: USGS Zionville

Snake Mountain is a mountain located along the border of North Carolina and Tennessee, east of the community of Zionville, in the southeastern United States. It is part of the Blue Ridge Mountains, and includes parts of Watauga County, North Carolina, and Johnson County, Tennessee. It has two peaks, the higher of which reaches an elevation of 5,564 feet (1,696 m). The lower peak, at 5,518 feet (1,682 m), is Johnson County's high point.

The mountain generates several feeder streams to the North Fork New River (via Maine Branch), South Fork New River (via Meat Camp Creek) and Watauga River (via Cove Creek). Several ridges form from Snake Mountain, with the main being Snake Mountain Ridge, mark the border of North Carolina and Tennessee. Also there is Sugartree Ridge and Hessian Ridge, which are smaller outcrops west of Snake Mountain. Several gaps also surround the mountain: Elk Horn Gap, Pottertown Gap, Rich Mountain Gap and State Line Gap.

Historically, both the Old Buffalo Trail and Daniel Boone Trail converge at the foot of the mountain, at Zionville.
