= Zionsville =

Zionsville or Zionville may refer to:

- Zionsville, Indiana
- Zionville, North Carolina
- Zionsville, Pennsylvania
