= Stanley A. Harris =

American Boy Scouts executive (1882–1978)

- Harris circa 1926
- Born: Stanley Austin Harris; October 31, 1882; Trade, Tennessee, US
- Died: August 13, 1978 (aged 95); Greensboro, North Carolina, US
- Resting place: United Methodist Church, Boone, North Carolina
- Occupations: Field director and national director of Inter-Racial Activities
- Employer: Boy Scouts of America

Stanley Austin Harris (October 31, 1882 – August 13, 1978) was an American executive of the Boy Scouts of America. He established one of the first Boy Scout troops in the United States in 1908, and was a charter member of the Boy Scouts of America two years later. Harris was the first director of Inter-Racial Activities of the Boy Scouts of America and helped to establish the first troops for Black and Native American boys.

== Early life ==
Harris was born on October 31, 1882, in Trade, Tennessee. His parents were Rachel Martitia (née Netherly) and William Jacob Harris, a Methodist minister and former Confederate officer. When he was two years old, his family moved to Avery County, North Carolina. There, Harris attended local schools, graduating from high school.

Harris attended U.S. Grant Memorial University in Athens, Tennessee, graduating in 1902. Harris taught and was the principal of the Cove Creek Academy in Avery County for a year. He continued with postgraduate studies at the American University at Harriman, Tennessee.

== Career ==
In 1903, he worked in a furniture factory in Harriman, Tennessee. In 1904, he was a salesman in a furntiure store in Lexington, Kentucky. In May 1904, he was a founding member and sergeant of the Evans Regiment, Company M, 2nd Infantry of the Kentucky State Guard in Lexington. In August 1905, he was promoted to sergeant major of the First Battalion, Second Regiment of the State Guard.

In 1907, he became the assistant secretary of the Frankfort, Kentucky YMCA. In this capacity, he took groups of boys on hikes in the mountains. He contacted Robert Baden-Powell, founder of The Boy Scouts Association in England, and received a charter for one of the first troops in the United States in December 1908. He was promoted to secretary of the YMCA in 1912, and the YMCA's state boys work secretary in 1916.

Harris became a charter member of the national Boy Scouts of America in 1910. In 1911, he became a Kentucky Scout Commissioner. He became a staff member of the Boy Scouts of America in New York City in 1917. His position was the national field commissioner for the southeastern district of the Boy Scouts of America. He was given the task of promoting interracial scounting in the Southeast.

In 1917, he helped form the first Black troop in Louisville, Kentucky, followed by the first American Indian troop in 1920. This led to Harris becoming the national director of the Inter-Racial Activities of the Boy Scouts of America in 1926. During the Great Depression, his salary was paid by the Laura Spelman Rockefeller Memorial Foundation, established by John D. Rockefeller in 1918. Harris retired from the Boy Scouts on October 1, 1947.

For a short time, he worked for an insurance company in Chattanooga, Tennessee. In 1950, he became the sales supervisor for Coleman's Tobacco Warehouse in Boone, North Carolina, a position he kept for more than twenty years.

== Honors ==
Harris was an honorary member of Alpha Phi Omega. The Tuskegee Institute gave Harris an honorary Ph.D. for his accomplishments with the Boy Scouts. In 2010, the North Carolina Department of Cultural Resources honored Harris with a highway historical marker in Boone, North Carolina.

== Personal life ==
In 1908, when he was 25 years old, doctors told Harris he would die within three months because of a heart condition. He hiked two miles a day until moving into a retirement community in 1975.

In 1919, Harris married Mary Swift, a former student of the Cove Creek Academy. They had two children, son Stanely Austin Harris Jr., and daughter, Marha Harris. They lived in New York City and also had a home in Sugard Grove, North Carolina, built between 1930 and 1931. In 1948, they moved to Boone, North Carolina.

In Boone, Harris was the secretary of the Boone Chamber of Commerce for ten years and was the founder and director of Watauga Citizens and Watauga Developer, two groups organized to attract industry to the area. He was a founder and president of the Boone Rotary Club, board chair of the Wautauga Hospital, and volunteered with the local Boy Scouts. In 1949, he was president of the Watauga Centennial. He was also treasurer of Horn in the West and helped raise money to developed the outdoor drama and to build the Daniel Boone Amphitheater.

When his wife's health began failing in 1975, the couple into the Friends' Home in Greensboro, North Carolina. Harris died in a hospital in Greensboro on August 13, 1978, at the age of 93. He was buried in the cemetery of the United Methodist Church in Boone, North Carolina.
