= Meat Camp, North Carolina =

Meat Camp
- Unincorporated community
- Location within the state of North Carolina
- Coordinates: 36°17′58″N 81°40′35″W
- Country: United States
- State: North Carolina
- County: Watauga County
- Elevation: 3,402 ft (1,037 m)
- Time zone: UTC-5 (Eastern (EST))
  - Summer (DST): UTC-4 (EDT)
- ZIP code: 28607
- Area code: 828
- GNIS feature ID: 1021403

Meat Camp is an unincorporated community located in Watauga County, North Carolina, United States. It is supposedly named after a primitive packing house used by hunters since before the Revolutionary War. Meat Camp has frequently been noted on lists of unusual place names. The community is located on Meat Camp Road (via NC 194), north of Boone.

== History ==
Situated along the Old Buffalo Trail and established before the Revolutionary War, Meat Camp was the location where hunters stored their dressed animal carcasses until they were ready to return to their homes in the lowlands. Between 1790-1800 a road was established through the area, connecting the Yadkin River Valley (near Wilkesboro) to Trade, Tennessee. In 1851, the Meat Camp Baptist Church was organized, establishing a permanent population in the area to this day.

== See also ==
- South Fork New River
