= AppalCart =

American bus company

AppalCART

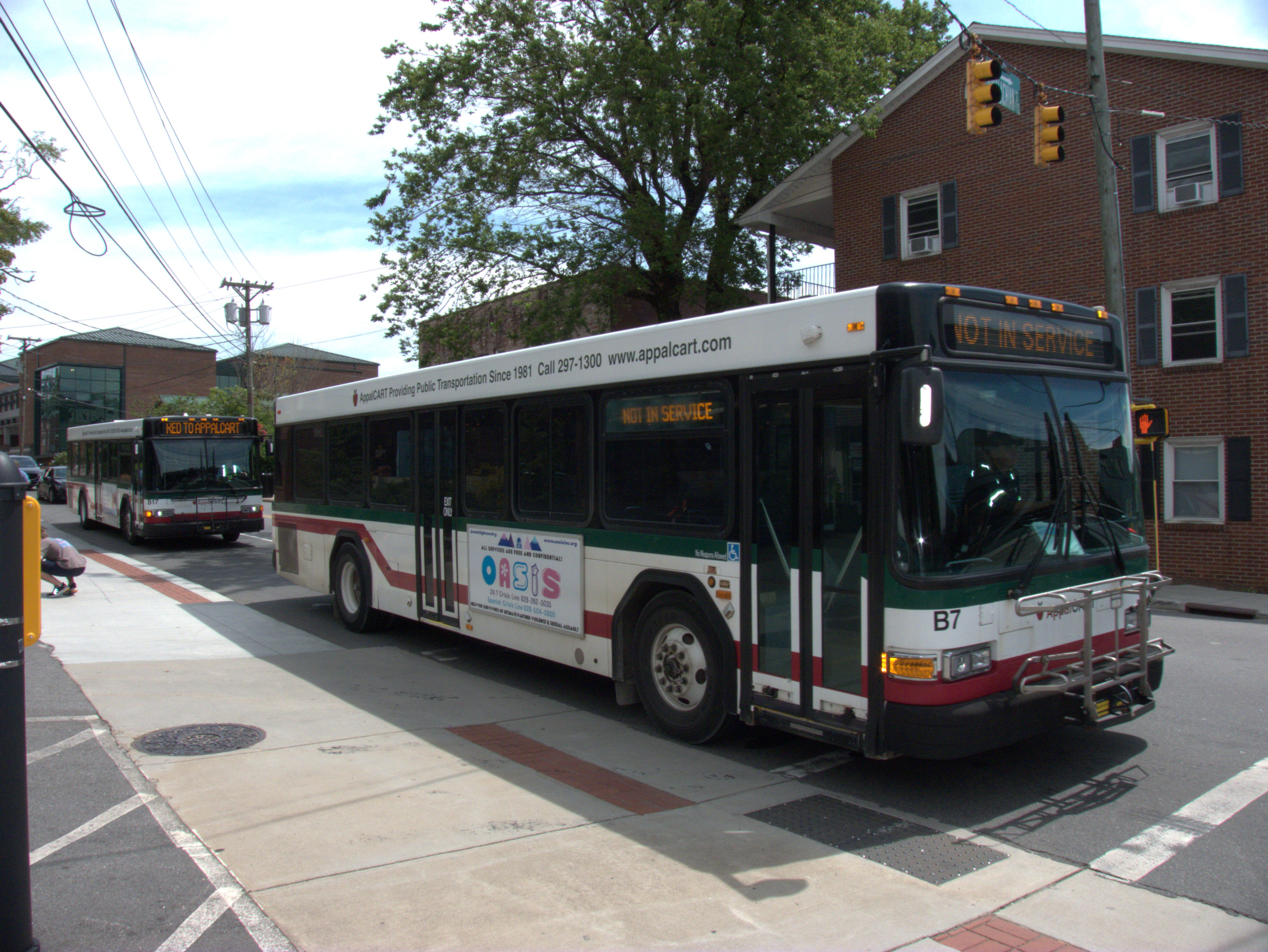
- AppalCART buses in Boone, NC.
- Founded: October 1981
- Headquarters: 305 Highway 105 Bypass Boone, NC 28607
- Locale: North Carolina
- Service area: Boone and Appalachian State University with service to rural locations throughout Watauga County
- Service type: Local and Student Commuter
- Routes: 24
- Stops: 120
- Hubs: ASU College Street Station; ASU Peacock Traffic Circle; Walmart Rural Route Drop-off
- Fleet: 43
- Daily ridership: 1,938,321 annually (2019)
- Fuel type: Diesel, gasoline & electric
- Operator: Watauga County
- Website: appalcart.com

AppalCART (Appalachian Campus Area Rapid Transit) is a free public bus network located in Boone, North Carolina. It provides fare-free fixed route and paratransit service throughout Appalachian State University and Boone, as well as low-fare van service to other towns within Watauga County. In 2013, AppalCART reported a ridership of 1,712,873 passenger trips. In 2019, it reported 1,938,321 trips. This number has dipped to 1.5 million trips in 2024. These trips resulted in 900,000 miles of public transit in 2024.

AppalCART is governed by an 8-member board. The current chairman of the board is Quint David. It receives its funding from a mix of federal, state, local, and Appalachian State University funds.

In 2022, Appalcart unveiled a new 45 foot electric bus, one of the first in the state of North Carolina. Electric busses in the system are expected to grow in future years. AppalCart is working towards expanding their electric fleet, and hopes to have the fleet be 100% electric by 2037.

As of July 2025, AppalCART has announced the addition of a double-decker bus, set to operate in August 2025.

== Routes ==
=== Regular routes ===
Regular routes
Route name and official color shade	Annual ridership (2019)	Year-round?	Start	High-traffic destinations	High-traffic corridors served	Opposite end (Note: Not all AppalCART routes are perfectly linear; some loop back on themselves and/or have branches.)
Blue	159,208	☒	ASU Peacock Traffic Circle	ASU Mountaineer Hall; ASU Appalachian Heights	Bodenheimer Drive	South Lot / Baseball Stadium
Express	114,688	check	ASU Peacock Traffic Circle	ASU Garwood Hall; ASU Convocation Center; Boone Mall; Walmart; Watauga Medical Center; The Finmore; ASU Mountain Laurel Hall; ASU Skywalk	Rivers Street; Blowing Rock Road / US 321, US 221; State Farm Road	ASU College of Health Sciences
Gold	16,099	check	ASU College Street Station	Sunway Charters / Dogwood Hall; ASU Skywalk; ASU Trivette Hall; ASU Mountaineer Hall; ASU Appalachian Heights	Bodenheimer Drive; Rivers Street; West King Street / US 421, US 321, NC 194; Hardin Street / US 321	South Lot / Baseball Stadium
Gray (formerly State Farm Lot Shuttle)	45,813	check	ASU Child Development Center	ASU Living Learning Center; ASU Schaefer Center; Horn in the West Lot; ASU Skywalk	Poplar Grove Road; Rivers Street; Hardin Street / US 321; East King Street / US 421; NC 105 / US 221; State Farm Road	ASU State Farm Lot
Green	294,372	check	Hospitality House	NC 105 Crosswalk; ASU NC 105 Lot; ASU Mountain Laurel Hall; ASU Schaefer Center; ASU College Street Station; Watauga High School; Mountaineer Village; ASU Skywalk	NC 105; Blowing Rock Road / US 321; Rivers Street; West King Street / US 421, US 321, NC 194; East King Street / US 421, US 221, NC 194	Cottages of Boone
NC 105 Lot Shuttle	20,023	☒	ASU NC 105 Lot	ASU Dogwood Hall; ASU Trivette Hall	NC 105; Bodenheimer Drive; Hardin Street / US 321 (Note: NC 105 Lot Shuttle drives on routes such as US 221, but it does not make stops associated with all of the roads it uses.)	ASU Mountaineer Hall
Orange	180,396	check	ASU College Street Station	Mountaineer Village	East King Street / US 421, US 221, NC 194	Brookshire Park Road
Pink	62,773	☒	ASU Peacock Traffic Circle	ASU Garwood Hall; ASU Convocation Center; Boone Mall; Watauga Medical Center; The Finmore; ASU Mountain Laurel Hall; ASU Skywalk	Rivers Street; Blowing Rock Road / US 321, US 221; State Farm Road	ASU College of Health Sciences
Pop 105	273,054	check	AppalCART Headquarters	High Country Condos; ASU Schaefer Center; ASU Convocation Center; McDonald's; NC 105 Crosswalk; University Highlands; CCC&TI (After 6:00 PM, until 9:50 PM)	US 421, US 321, NC 194; Rivers Street; Blowing Rock Road / US 321; NC 105; NC 105 Byp.	AppalCART Headquarters
Purple	250,639	check	ASU Peacock Traffic Circle	ASU Garwood Hall; ASU Convocation Center; Boone Mall; The Village at Meadowview; ASU Mountain Laurel Hall; ASU Skywalk	Rivers Street; Blowing Rock Road / US 321, US 221; Greenway Road	
Red	366,604	check	AppalCART Headquarters	High Country Condos; ASU College Street Station; Walmart; Watauga Medical Center; Quail Drive	West King Street / US 421, US 321, NC 194; East King Street / US 421; NC 105 / US 221; Greenway Road; State Farm Road	ASU College of Health Sciences
Silver	58,385	☒	Caldwell Community College & Technical Institute	Studio West; ASU NC 105 Lot; ASU Mountain Laurel Hall; ASU Skywalk; Pinnacle Drive	US 421, US 321, NC 194; Rivers Street; Blowing Rock Road / US 321; NC 105; NC 105 Byp.	Caldwell Community College & Technical Institute
State Farm Lot Shuttle	No data (Established 2023)	☒	ASU Trivette Hall	ASU Skywalk; Sunway Charters / ASU Dogwood Hall; ASU College Street Station; Quail Drive	Rivers Street; Hardin Street / US 321 (Note: State Farm Lot Shuttle drives on routes such as US 221, but it does not make stops associated with all of the roads it uses.); State Farm Road	ASU State Farm Lot
Wellness District	41,535	☒	ASU College of Health Sciences	The Finmore; Watauga Medical Center	State Farm Road	ASU College of Health Sciences
Total annual ridership (including Night Owl routes and irregular routes such as Game Day routes) (2019):	1,938,321	-	-	-	-	-

=== Night Owl routes ===
Night Owl routes
Route name and official color shade	Annual ridership (2019) (Note: In 2019, Night Owl routes only ran August through November. From 2021 onwards, they run August through May. As such, these figures are inaccurate for the present day and are likely much higher, however, no data is available.)	Year-round?	Start	High-traffic destinations	High-traffic corridors served	Opposite end
Express	3,163	☒	ASU Peacock Traffic Circle	ASU Garwood Hall; ASU Convocation Center; Boone Mall; Walmart; Watauga Medical Center; The Finmore; ASU Mountain Laurel Hall; ASU Skywalk	Rivers Street; Blowing Rock Road / US 321, US 221	The Village at Meadowview
Gold	2,548	☒	ASU College Street Station	Sunway Charters / Dogwood Hall; ASU Skywalk; ASU Trivette Hall; ASU Mountaineer Hall; ASU Appalachian Heights	Bodenheimer Drive; Rivers Street; West King Street / US 421, US 321, NC 194; Hardin Street / US 321	South Lot / Baseball Stadium
Pop 105	3,517	☒	AppalCART Headquarters	High Country Condos; ASU Schaefer Center; ASU Convocation Center; McDonald's; NC 105 Crosswalk; University Highlands	US 421, US 321, NC 194; Rivers Street; Blowing Rock Road / US 321; NC 105; NC 105 Byp.	AppalCART Headquarters
Total annual ridership (2019)	9,137	-	-	-	-	-

=== Game Day routes ===
In addition to the above routes, AppalCART operates seven game day routes: Gray, Express, Purple, Orange, Blue, Gold, and the Disability Shuttle, totaling 24 routes on the system. There are three stops only served by these routes: Poplar Grove Connector Parking Lot, ASU Hill Street Lot, and ASU Stadium East Gate, totaling 120 stops on the entire system.

=== Former routes ===
Former routes
Route name and official color shade	Fate	Active from	Year-round?	Start	High-traffic destinations	High-traffic corridors served	Opposite end
Blowing Rock	Low ridership	May 2018–Aug 2021	(Weekends May-Aug only)	Tanger Outlets	Morris Street; Holiday Inn Express; The Village Inn	Valley Blvd / US 321, US 221; Main Street / US 321 Bus.	Green Park Inn
Gray (1st version) (Note: A duplicate of the Silver Route, but serving the NC 105 lot. The Silver Route did not serve the NC 105 lot at this time.)	Staffing shortages	Aug 2021–Sep 2021	☒	Caldwell Community College & Technical Institute	Studio West; ASU NC 105 Lot; ASU Mountain Laurel Hall; ASU Skywalk; Pinnacle Drive	US 421, US 321, NC 194; Rivers Street; Blowing Rock Road / US 321; NC 105; NC 105 Byp.	Caldwell Community College & Technical Institute
Green East	Merged with Teal to become Green Route	?–Aug 2018	check	ASU College Street Station	Mountaineer Village	East King Street / US 421, US 221, NC 194	Hospitality House
Green West	Merged with Red	?–Aug 2018	check	ASU College Street Station	Kensington Apartments; High Country Condos	West King Street / US 421, US 321, NC 194; Queen Street	Old Bristol Road / US 421 near NC 105 Bypass
Orange Night Owl	Staffing shortages, COVID-19 pandemic	Aug 2019–Nov 2019	☒	ASU College Street Station	Mountaineer Village	East King Street / US 421, US 221, NC 194	Brookshire Park Road
Teal	Merged with Green East to become Green Route	Aug 2013–Aug 2018	check	ASU Peacock Traffic Circle	Studio West; NC 105 Crosswalk; ASU Appalachian Panhellenic Hall; ASU Skywalk; ASU Convocation Center	Rivers Street; Blowing Rock Road / US 321; NC 105	Cottages of Boone
Night Owl	Unknown	?–Mid-2001	No data archived	No data archived	No data archived	No data archived	No data archived

== Board of Directors ==
The board of directors of Appalcart is made up of 8 members who are:

- Quint David - Chair
- Barry Sauls - Vice Chair
- Ronnie Marsh - Member Commissioner
- Todd Carter - Boone Town Council
- Angie Boitnotte - Project on Aging
- David Jackson - At-Large
- Joe Eller - Rider Representative
- John Adams - Appalachain State University Representative
