= Zionville, North Carolina =

Zionville
- Unincorporated community
- Location within the state of North Carolina
- Coordinates: 36°20′05″N 81°44′35″W
- Country: United States
- State: North Carolina
- County: Watauga County
- Elevation: 3,209 ft (978 m)
- Time zone: UTC-5 (Eastern (EST))
  - Summer (DST): UTC-4 (EDT)
- ZIP code: 28698
- Area code: 828
- GNIS feature ID: 1023353

Zionville in an unincorporated community located in Watauga County, North Carolina. The community lies at the North Carolina/Tennessee state line, between Boone and Mountain City, along Old US Highway 421.

== History ==
Zionville is the location where the Old Buffalo Trail and Daniel Boone's Trail intersect before reaching Trade, Tennessee, just across the border. In 1836, the Zionville Baptist Church was established. In 1866, Tom Dula stopped at the home of Colonel James Grayson and worked at his farm for a few days; soon after, authorities from Wilkes County arrived to arrest him for the murder of Laura Foster. He was finally found west of Mountain City and was sent back for trial.

In 1921, NC 60 was established, following Daniel Boone's Trail from Zionville to Boone; the highway then continued east to Castle Hayne (near Wilmington). From 1930-'32, the route overlapped with US 321, it was soon replaced in 1932 by US 421. In late 1934, NC 60 was decommissioned. In 1962 or 1963, US 421 was moved east to its current alignment, bypassing Zionville.

== See also ==
- Rich Mountain Bald
- Snake Mountain
