= Ashe Metamorphic Suite =

- Stratigraphic range: 470-335 Ma
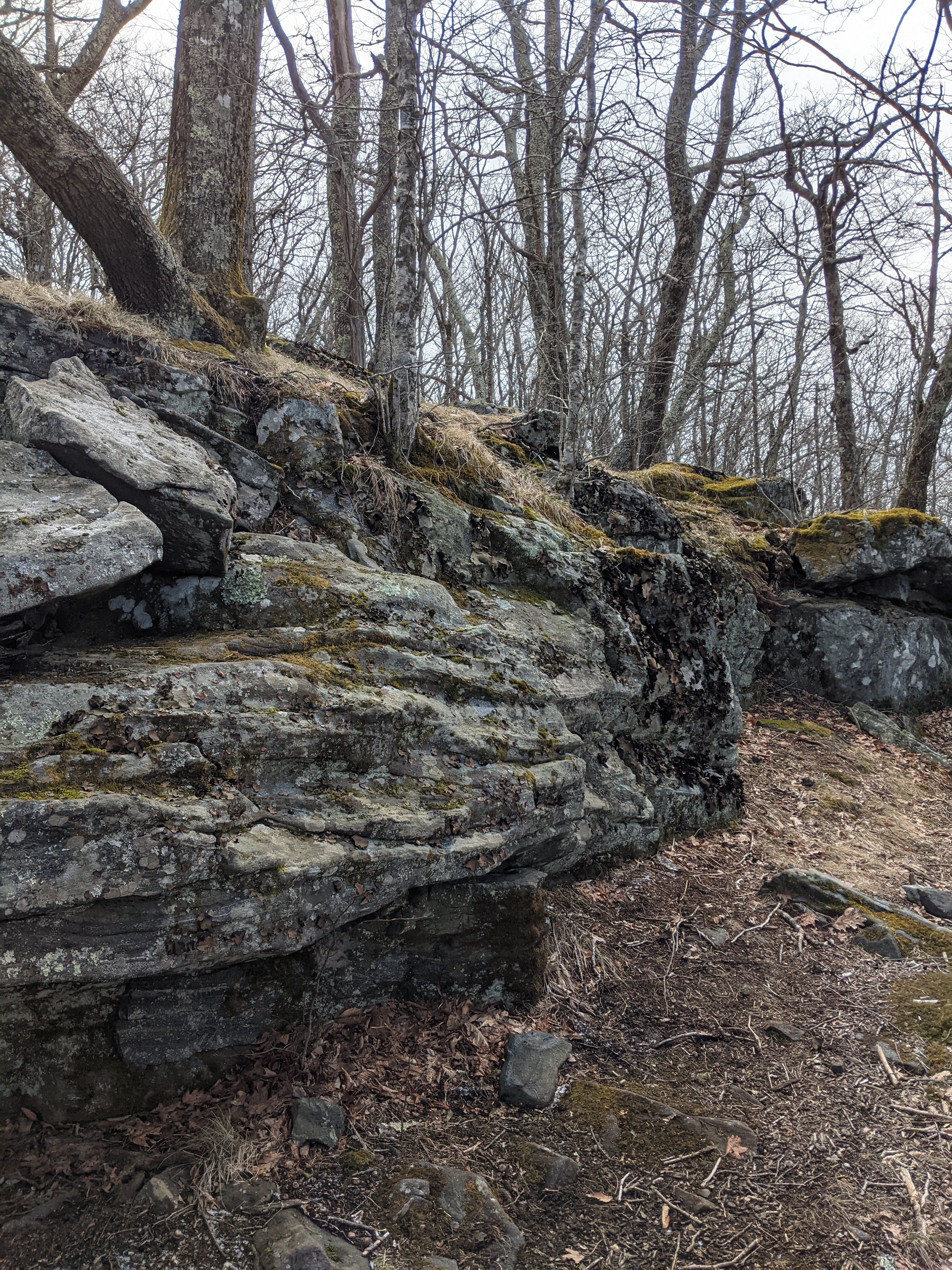
- Outcrop of the Ashe Metamorphic Suite taken at Elk Knob State Park.
- Type: Geological formation
- Area: Appalachian Mountains

Location
- Location: Elk Knob State Park, North Carolina
- Coordinates: 36°19′38″N 81°40′37″W

Type section
- Country: United States

The Ashe Metamorphic Suite, also referred to as the Ashe Formation, was named after its type locality, Ashe County, North Carolina. The Ashe Metamorphic Suite is located in the Eastern Blue Ridge providence that extends from North Carolina up to South-Western Virginia. It is a collection of metamorphic rocks of both sedimentary and volcanic origin. Zircon dating indicates an age of 470 to 335 Ma for the unit. The protolith of the Ashe Metamorphic Suite was deposited during the Late Proterozoic and reaching its cooling age during the end of the Devonian. The Ashe Metamorphic Suite is overwhelmingly composed of amphibolites and mica schists.

== Nomenclature and Equivalent Units ==
The Ashe Metamorphic Suite is thought to be correlative with a lower part of the Lynchburg Group in Virginia, the Mount Roger Formation in North Carolina and Virginia, and the Tallulah Falls Formation in Georgia.

== Geologic overview ==
The Ashe Metamorphic Suite is composed of a variety of different rocks such as metagreywackes, muscovite schist, quartzite, graphitic schist, and mafic rocks such as amphibolite and hornblende gneiss. The unit is overwhelmingly composed of mica schist with the southwest having intrusions of the ultramafic rocks. The Ashe Metamorphic Suite overlies the Chilhowee Group of North Carolina and Tennessee or the mesoproterozoic Blue Ridge basement complex. The Alligator Back Metamorphic Suite structurally overlies the Ashe Metamorphic Suite. The Ashe Metamorphic Suite is intersected by the Grandfather Mountain window leaving a northeastern and southwestern region of the unit.

== Petrology and Geochemistry ==
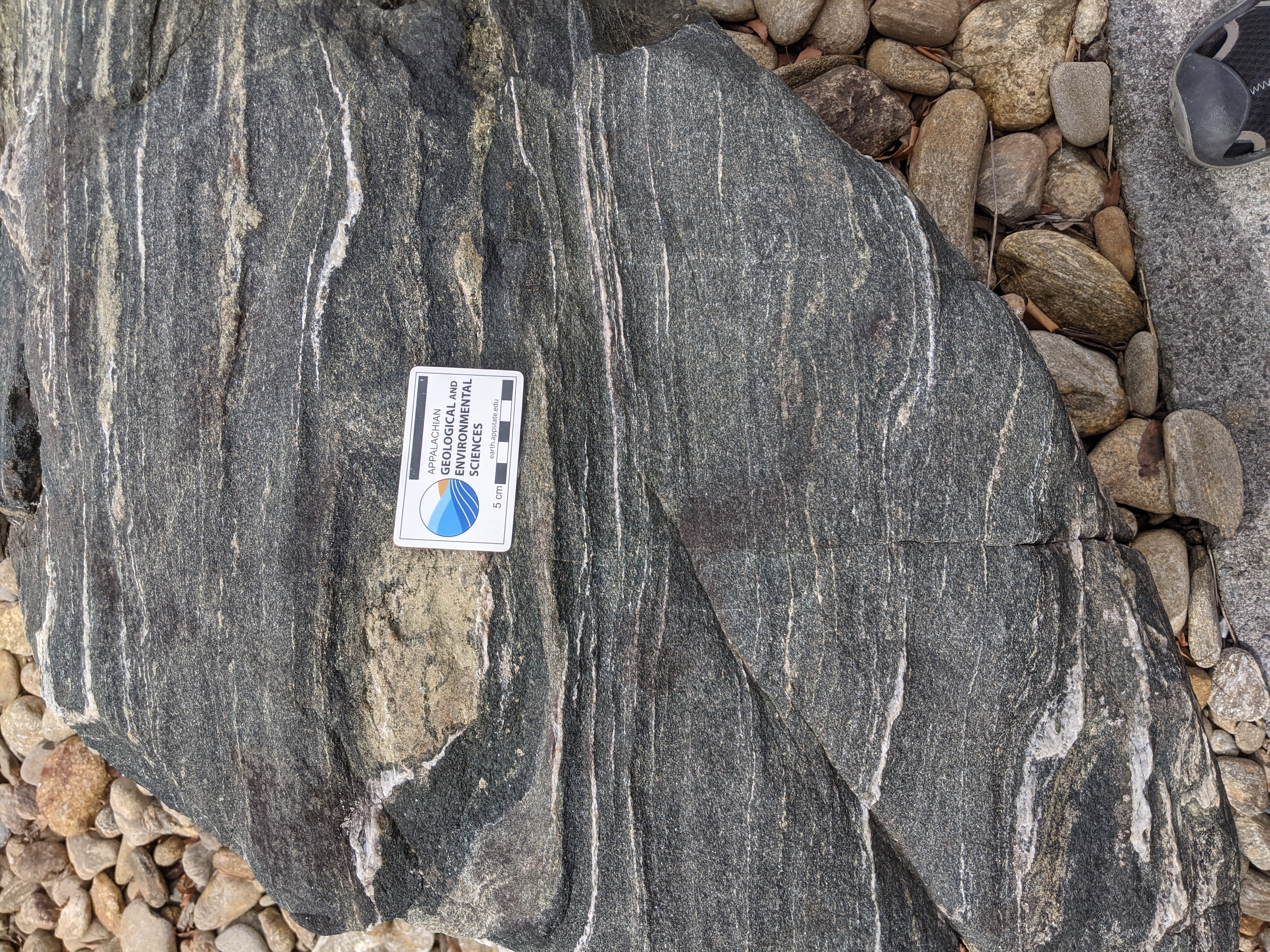
Ashe Metamorphic Suite amphibolite from Meat Camp, NC.

=== Chemical composition ===
A whole rock analyses of 8 samples of Ashe Metamorphic Suite amphibolites demonstrates a basaltic origin of the amhibolites suggesting a mid-ocean ridge basalt protolith.

Oxide Weight %	As-20	As-24	As-49	As-56	As-82	As-12	As-27	As-66
SiO_{2}	51.69	50.67	49.31	49.85	51.00	47.89	50.79	50.93
TiO_{2}	0.15	0.44	1.29	1.88	1.43	3.23	3.16	13.78
Al_{2}O_{3}	12.28	12.07	16.20	13.93	14.14	12.88	12.01	13.78
Fe_{2}O_{3}	12.89	14.88	10.66	14.15	12.15	16.44	16.06	15.03
MnO	0.15	0.18	0.16	0.20	0.17	0.21	0.22	0.20
MgO	8.83	7.95	7.35	6.68	7.22	12.78	5.54	4.31
CaO	11.64	11.13	9.38	10.03	10.32	9.79	9.24	6.76
Na_{2}O	1.28	1.51	3.61	2.87	2.78	2.92	2.34	2.25
K_{2}O	0.19	0.17	0.25	0.31	0.29	0.27	0.83	2.39
P_{2}O_{5}	0.02	0.06	0.17	0.33	0.27	0.44	0.43	0.84
Total	99.12	99.06	98.38	100.23	99.77	100.20	100.62	98.89

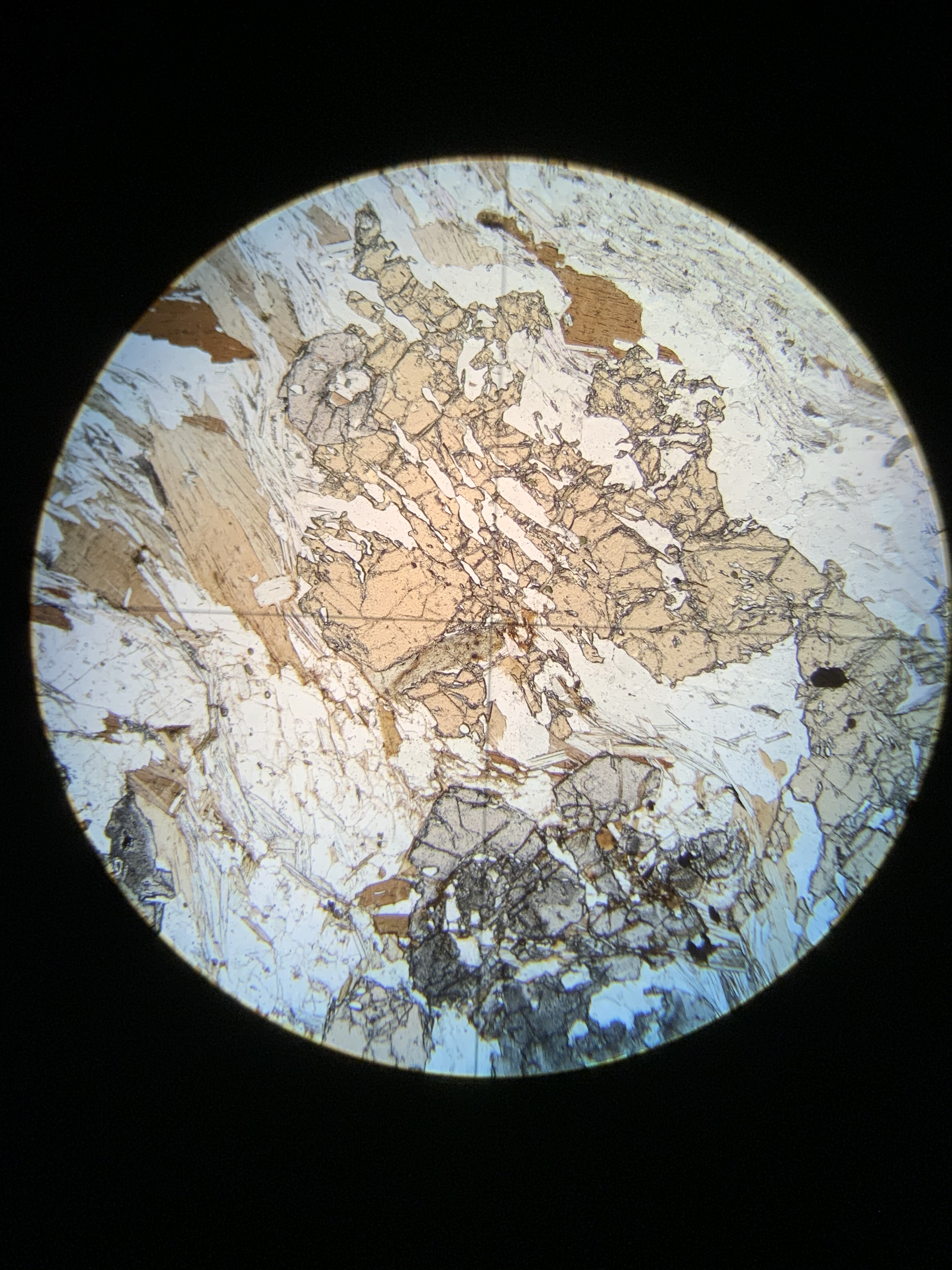
PPL Pelite

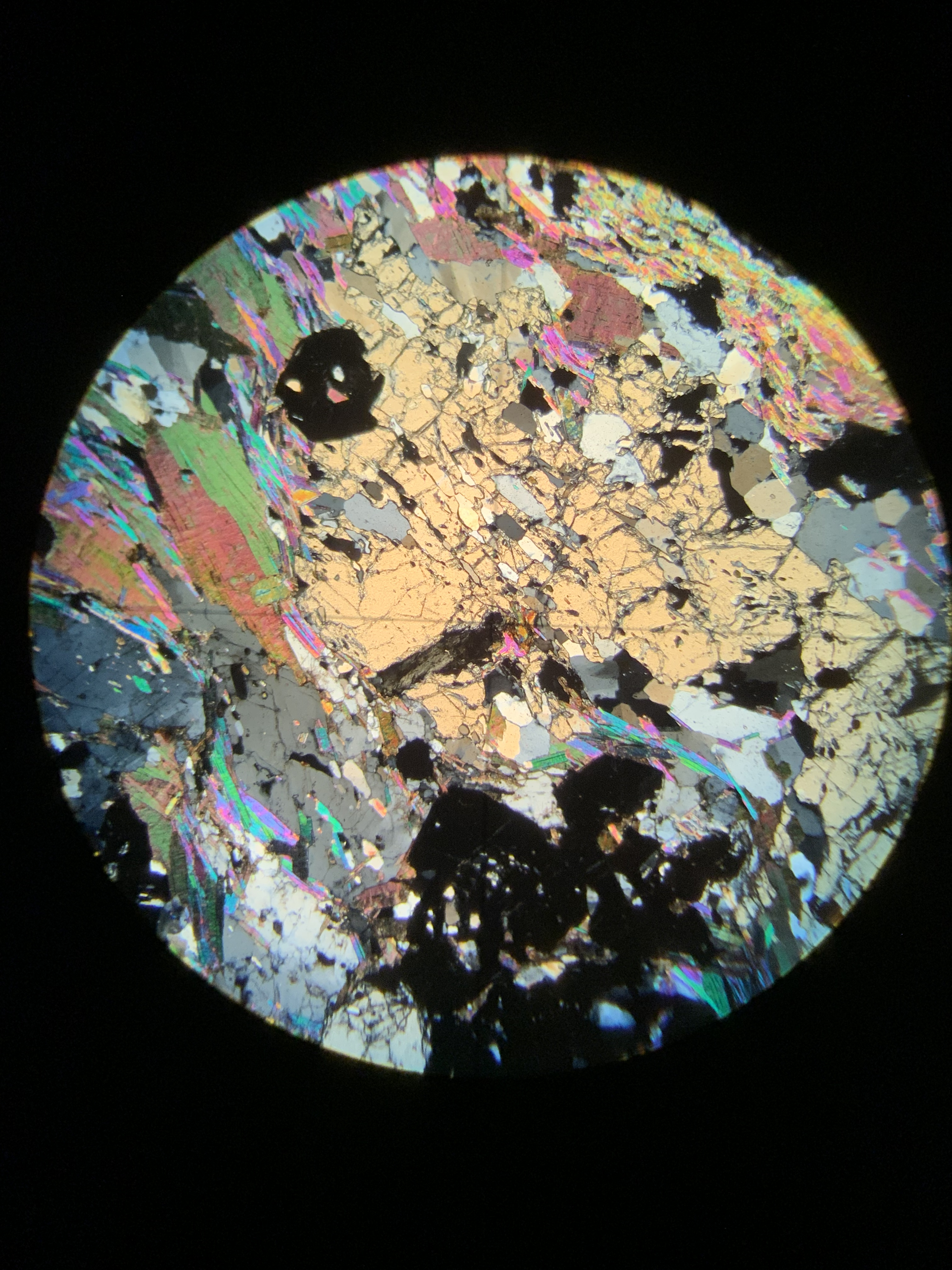
XPL Pelite

Thin section of a pelite from the Ashe Metamorphic Suite in plain polarized light and crossed polarized light.

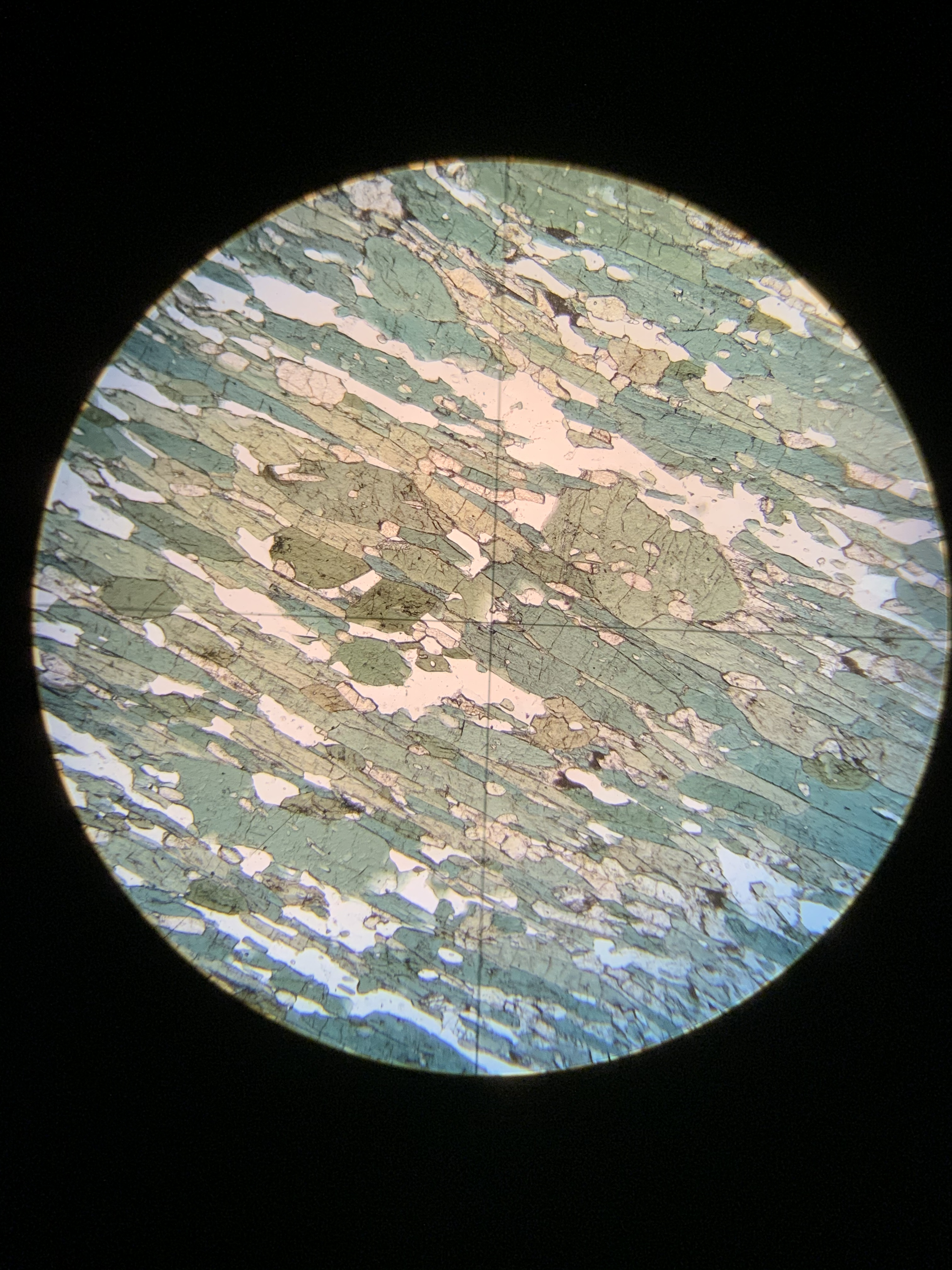
PPL Amphibolite

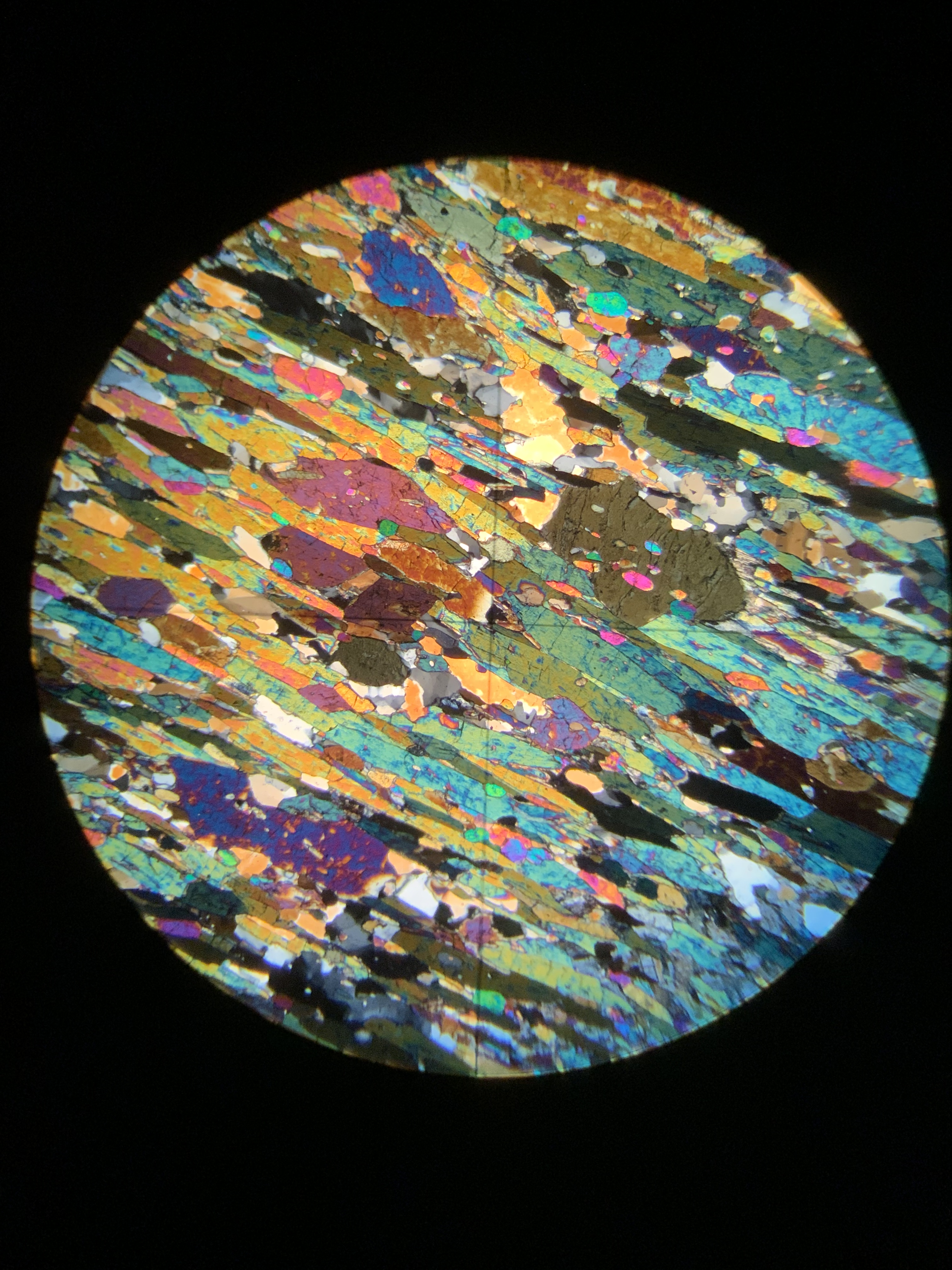
XPL Amphibolite

Thin section of a amphibolite from the Ashe Metamorphic Suite in plain polarized light and crossed polarized light.

=== Mafic Rocks ===
The mafic rocks of the Ashe Metamorphic Suite are composed primarily of hornblende schists and gneiss. The main minerals composing these rocks are hornblende, quartz and plagioclase with minor garnet, biotite, epidote-zoisite and magnetite being present.

=== Pelitic schists ===
The pelitic rocks of the Ashe Metamorohic Suite to the north of the Grandfather Mountain Window are primarily muscovite schists. Depending on the metamorphic grade, the pelitic rocks can be consist of quartz, plagioclase, biotite, garnet, chlorite, staurolite, and kyanite.

== Formation and origin ==
The Ashe Metamorphic Suite is confined between the opening of the Iapetus sea at the beginning of the Cambrian, and the closing of the ocean by in the Early Ordovician. It was initially suggested the Ashe Metamorphic Suite was deposited on a rifted continental margin with a nonconformable contact with the underlying Cranberry Gneiss. More recently the Ashe Metamorphic Suite is thought to be a subduction-related mélange with the contact between the Cranberry Gneiss and the Ashe Metamorphic Suite being a fault, or that the Ashe Metamorphic Suite was deposited as a back-arc basin.
