= Silverstone, North Carolina =

- Unincorporated community
- Location within North Carolina Location within the United States
- Coordinates: 36°17′17″N 81°45′06″W
- Country: United States
- State: North Carolina
- County: Watauga
- Elevation: 2,884 ft (879 m)
- Time zone: UTC-5 (Eastern (EST))
  - Summer (DST): UTC-4 (EDT)
- Area code: 828
- GNIS feature ID: 1022640

Silverstone is an unincorporated community in Watauga County, North Carolina, United States.
