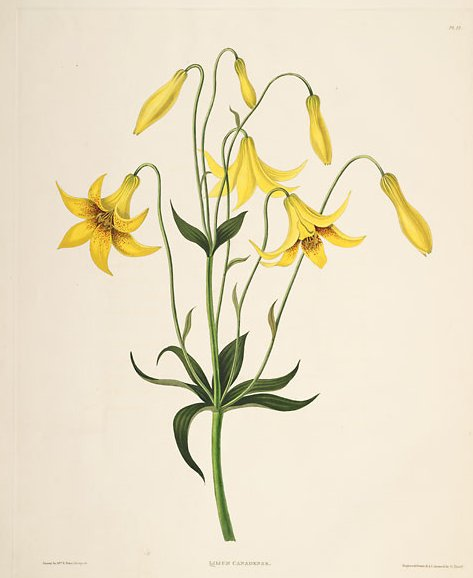
- Canada lily

Conservation status
- Secure (NatureServe)

Scientific classification
- Kingdom: Plantae
- Clade: Tracheophytes
- Clade: Angiosperms
- Clade: Monocots
- Order: Liliales
- Family: Liliaceae
- Subfamily: Lilioideae
- Genus: Lilium
- Species: L. canadense

Binomial name
- Lilium canadense L.

Synonyms
- Lilium pulchrum Salisb.; Lilium penduliflorum Redouté; Lilium pendulum Spae; Lilium peramoenum Farw.

= Lilium canadense =

Species of lily

Lilium canadense, commonly called the Canada lily, wild yellow-lily, or meadow lily, is a native of eastern North America. Its native range extends from Ontario to Nova Scotia south to Georgia and Alabama. It is most common in New England, the Appalachian Mountains, and the Canadian Maritimes. It is also cultivated as an ornamental in Europe and other places.

Flowers emerge in June. They are nodding (hanging downward), yellow, orange or red, often with darker spots. The plant has become less common in urban and suburban areas due to heavy browsing by the white-tailed deer.

== Description ==
These plants usually live in moist meadows and wood margins. They can grow up to 0.5–1.5 m (1.6–4.9 ft) with yellow, orange or red flowers 50–75 mm 50–75 mm (2.0–3.0 in) wide which emerge between June and July.

== Culinary uses ==
The flower buds and roots were traditionally gathered and eaten by North American indigenous peoples.

== Conservation status in the United States ==
It is listed Rare in Indiana, as Exploitably Vulnerable in New York (state), and as Threatened in Rhode Island and Tennessee.

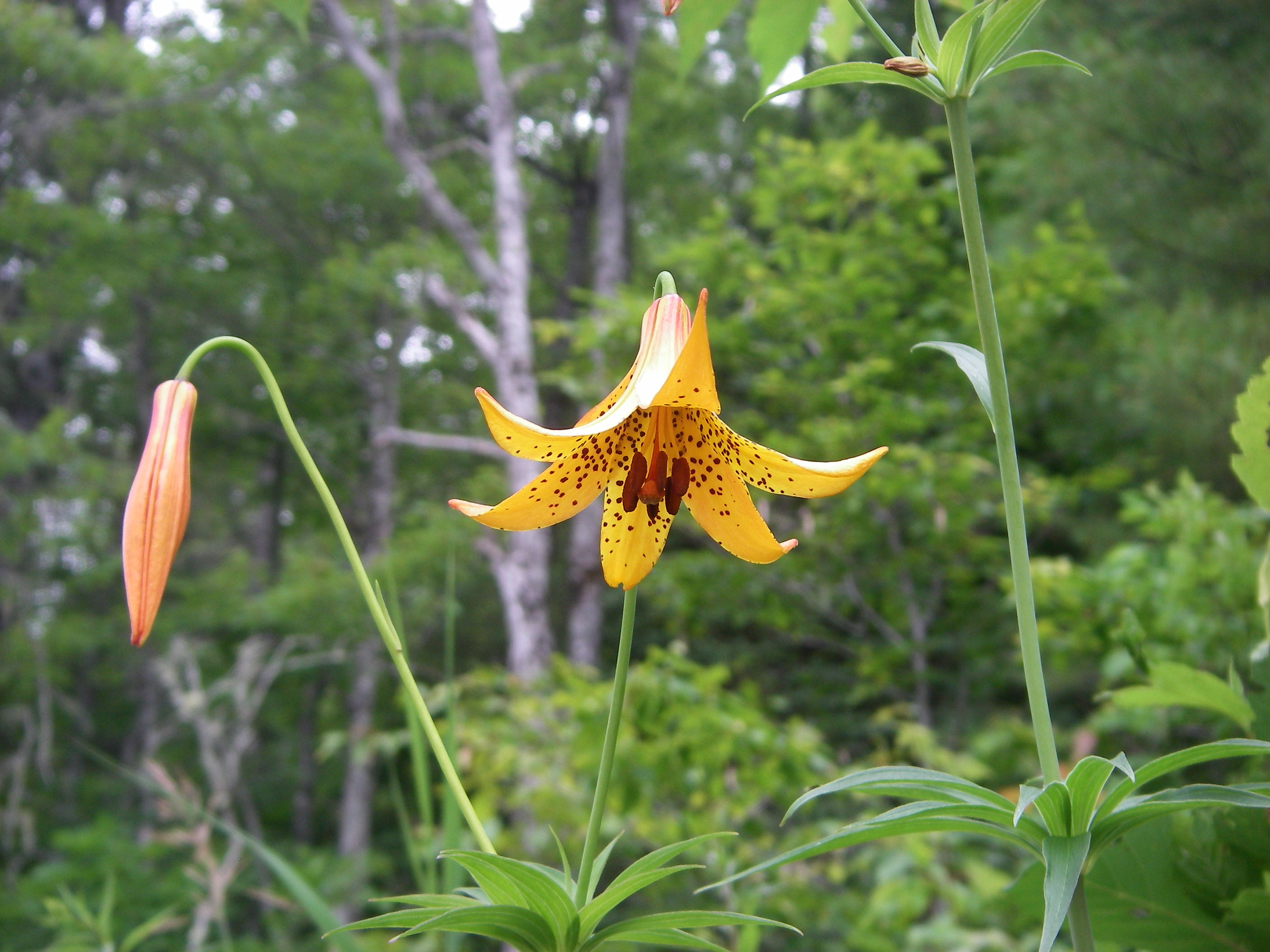
Canada lily in Maine

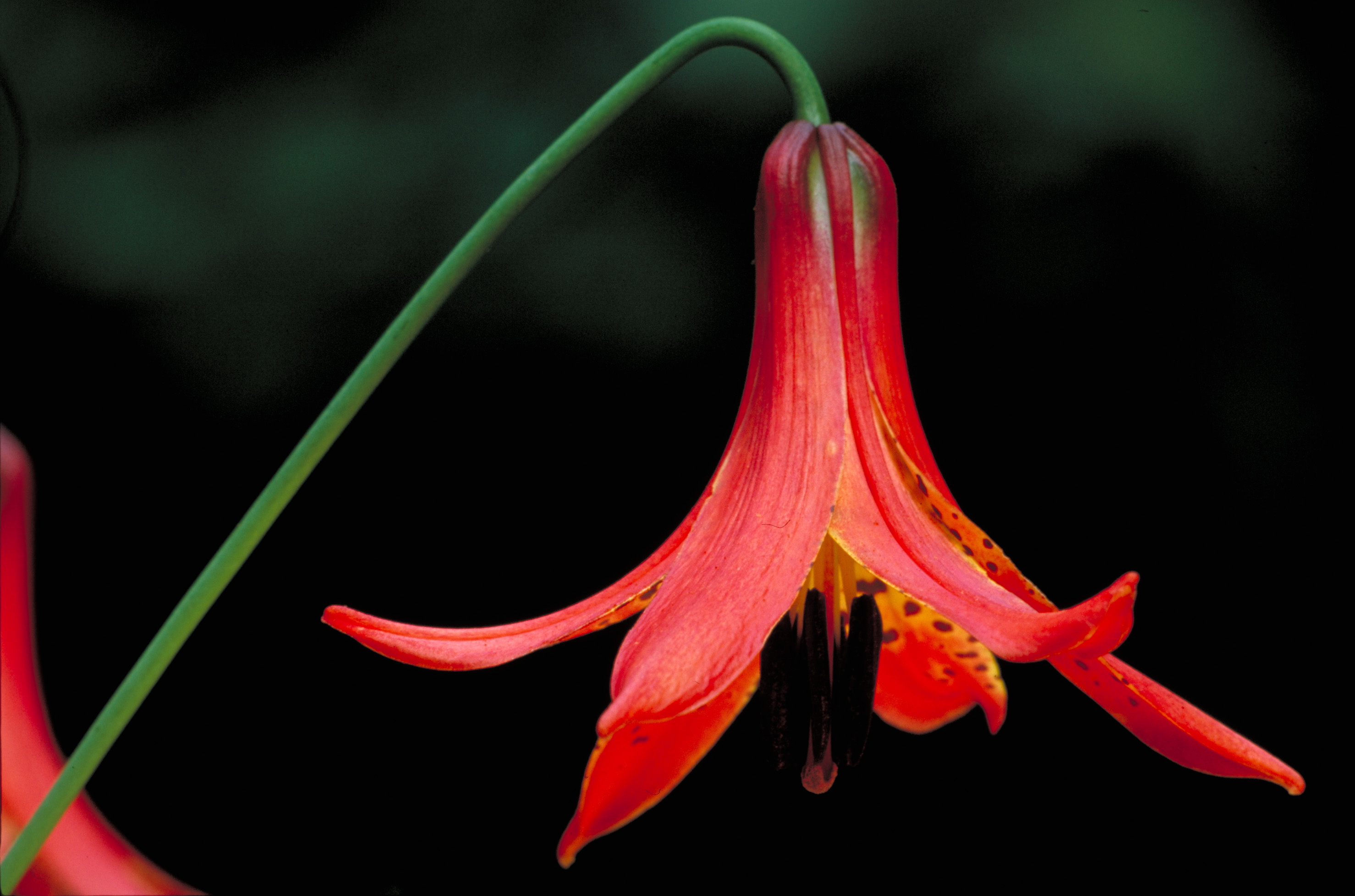
Red Canada lily

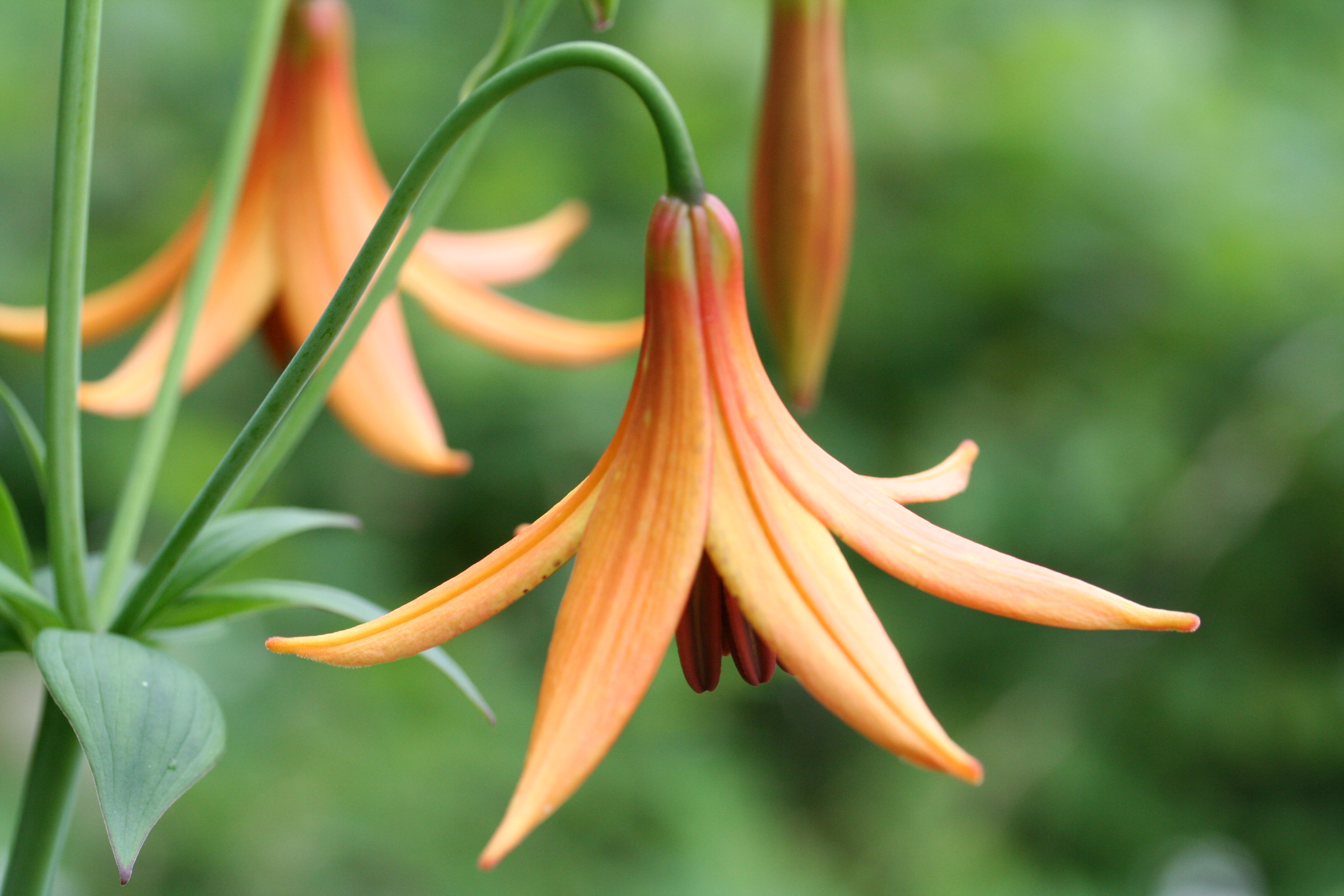
Lilium canadense L., Batiscan River banks, Quebec, Canada
