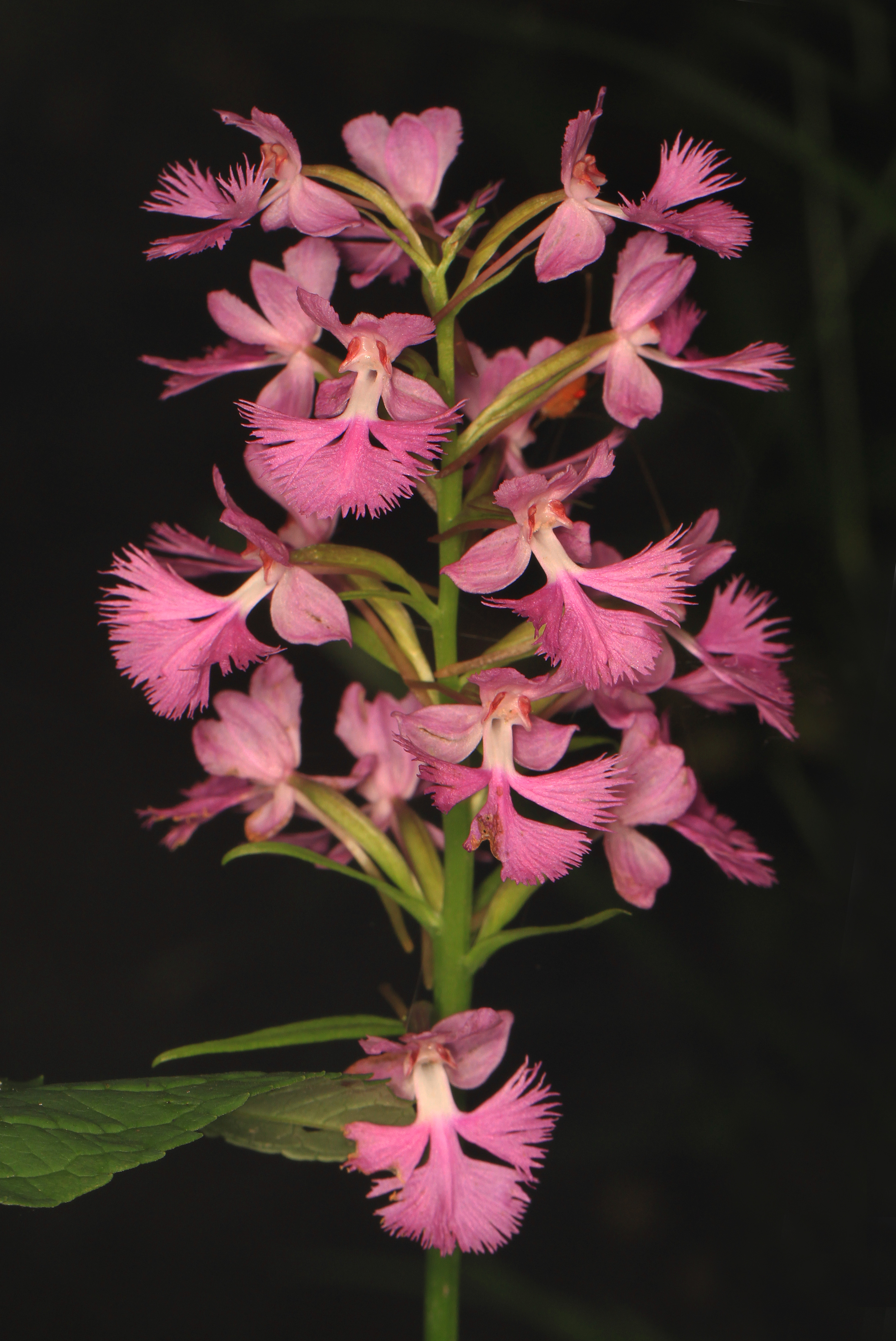
- Flower of Platanthera grandiflora

Conservation status
- Secure (NatureServe)

Scientific classification
- Kingdom: Plantae
- Clade: Tracheophytes
- Clade: Angiosperms
- Clade: Monocots
- Order: Asparagales
- Family: Orchidaceae
- Subfamily: Orchidoideae
- Genus: Platanthera
- Species: P. grandiflora

Binomial name
- Platanthera grandiflora (Bigelow) Lindl.

Synonyms
- Orchis grandiflora Bigelow (basionym); Orchis fimbriata Dryand.; Habenaria fimbriata (Dryand.) R.Br.; Habenaria grandiflora (Bigelow) Torr. ex L.C.Beck; Platanthera fimbriata (Dryand.) Lindl.; Habenaria fimbriata f. albiflora E.L.Rand & Redfield; Blephariglottis grandiflora (Bigelow) Rydb.; Fimbriella psycodes var. grandiflora (Bigelow) Butzin; Habenaria fimbriata f. mentotonsa Fernald; Platanthera grandiflora f. albiflora (E.L.Rand & Redfield) Catling; Platanthera grandiflora f. mentotonsa (Fernald) P.M.Br.; Platanthera grandiflora f. bicolor P.M.Br.; Platanthera grandiflora f. carnea P.M.Br.

= Platanthera grandiflora =

Greater purple fringed orchid

Species of orchid

Platanthera grandiflora, the greater purple fringed orchid, is a species of orchid, genus Platanthera, occurring from Ontario to Newfoundland, south along the Appalachian Mountains to northeastern Georgia, with an isolated population in Illinois. It is imperiled in Georgia, Tennessee, Virginia and North Carolina and presumed extirpated in Ohio.
