= Tom Dula =

Confederate Army soldier (1844–1868)

- Born: June 23, 1844; Wilkes County, North Carolina, U.S.
- Died: May 1, 1868 (aged 23); Statesville, North Carolina, U.S.
- Cause of death: Execution by hanging
- Other name: Tom Dooley
- Occupations: farm hand, soldier
- Known for: Inspiration for the folk song "Tom Dooley"

Thomas C. Dula (June 23‚ 1844 – May 1, 1868) was a former Confederate soldier who was convicted of murdering Laura Foster. National publicity from newspapers such as The New York Times turned Dula's story into a folk legend. Although Laura was murdered in Wilkes County, North Carolina, Dula was tried, convicted, and hanged in Statesville. Considerable controversy surrounded the case. In subsequent years, a folk song was written (entitled "Tom Dooley", based on the pronunciation in the local dialect), and many oral traditions were passed down about the circumstances surrounding Foster's murder and Dula's subsequent execution. The Kingston Trio recorded a hit version of the murder ballad in 1958.

== Early life ==
Tom Dula was born to a poor Appalachian hill-country family in Wilkes County, North Carolina, most likely the youngest of three brothers, with one younger sister, Eliza. Dula grew up, attended school, and "probably played with the female Fosters" – Anne and her cousins Laura and Pauline.

Three months before his 18th birthday, on March 15, 1862, Tom enlisted in the Confederate Army as a private in Company K, 42nd North Carolina Infantry Regiment. He was captured, and subsequently released in April 1865.

Dula wrote a 15-page account of his life, as well as a note that exonerated Anne Foster (then using the married name Melton). His literacy is highly unusual, considering the harsh poverty of his upbringing. Dula played the fiddle and was considered by those who knew him well to be a "ladies' man".

== Military service ==
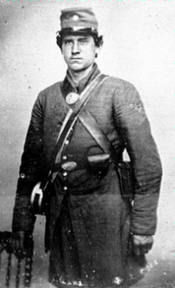
Unidentified man in a Confederate uniform.

Contrary to newspaper accounts at the time, Dula did not serve in Colonel Zebulon Vance's 26th North Carolina Infantry regiment, he had instead served in the 42nd North Carolina Infantry regiment, under Company K. Also, rumors that he "played the banjo" in the army band for Vance's benefit and entertained the colonel with his antics were false. These have often been cited as the reason that Vance was so quick to lead the defense during Dula's trial.

Dula did not come through the war completely unscathed, as folklore, oral tradition, and some modern writers have claimed. He was wounded several times in battle. His brothers died in the war, leaving Tom as his mother's "sole remaining boy".

Dula did sometimes use his musical talents in the army, and on one surviving muster roll he is listed as a "musician" and a "drummer".

== Murder of Laura Foster ==
Anne Foster married an older man, James Melton, who was a farmer, cobbler, and neighbor of both the Fosters and the Dulas. Melton also served in the war, taking part in the Battle of Gettysburg. Both Melton and Dula were captured and sent to a northern prison camp. They were released after the war ended and returned home. Shortly after his return, Dula resumed his relationship with Anne. With a reputation as a libertine, it was not long before he began an intimate relationship with Laura Foster, Anne's cousin. Folklore has it that Laura became pregnant, and that she and Dula had decided to elope. On the morning she was to meet Dula, May 25, 1866, Laura quietly left her home and rode off on her father's horse. She was never seen alive again.

It is not truly known what happened that day, but many stories have grown that implicate Anne Melton. Some tales claim that Anne murdered Laura Foster because she was jealous that Dula was marrying her. These stories say that Dula suspected Anne had killed her, but he still loved Anne enough to take the blame himself. It was Anne's word that led to the discovery of Laura's body, leading to further suspicion of Anne's guilt. Anne's cousin, Pauline Foster, testified that Anne had taken her to the grave one night to make sure it was still well hidden.

Witnesses at the trial testified that Dula made the incriminating statement he was going to "do in" the one who gave him "the pock" (syphilis). Their testimony suggested that Dula believed Laura had given him syphilis, which he had passed on to Anne. However, the local doctor testified he had treated both Dula and Anne for syphilis (using blue mass), as he also had Pauline Foster, who in fact was the first to be treated. Many believe that Dula caught the disease from Pauline Foster, then passed it on to both Anne and Laura.

Once the grave had been located, Laura Foster's decomposed body was found with her legs drawn up to fit in the shallow grave. She had been stabbed once in the chest. The gruesome murder and the lovers' triangle, combined with the rumors that circulated in the small backwoods town, captured the public's attention and led to the lasting notoriety of the crime.

Dula's role in the murder is still debated. After the murder he stopped at the home of his relative Thomas Dula, a site that became Dula Springs Hotel. He had fled the area before Laura's body was found, after locals accused him of murdering Laura. Calling himself Tom Hall, he worked for about a week for Colonel James Grayson, just across the state line in Trade, Tennessee. Grayson was later mentioned in the song about Dula, and from that came the myth that he had been Dula's rival for the love of Laura Foster, but Grayson actually had no prior connection to either Dula or Foster. Once Dula's identity was known, Grayson did help the Wilkes County posse bring him in, but that was his only part in the affair.

=== Trial ===
Following Dula's arrest, former North Carolina Governor Zebulon Vance represented him pro bono, and to the end of his life maintained that Dula was innocent. He succeeded in having the trial moved from Wilkesboro to Statesville, since it was believed Dula could not receive a fair trial in Wilkes County. Nevertheless, Dula was convicted, and although he was given a new trial on appeal, he was convicted again. His supposed accomplice, Jack Keaton, was set free, and on Dula's word, Anne Melton was acquitted. As he stood on the gallows facing death, Dula reportedly said, "Gentlemen, I did not harm a single hair on that fair lady's head." He was executed on May 1, 1868, nearly two years after Laura Foster's murder. Dula's younger sister and her husband retrieved his body for burial.

=== Petitions ===
In 2001, the citizens of North Wilkesboro presented a petition to North Carolina Governor Mike Easley, asking that Tom Dula be posthumously pardoned. No action was taken.

Tom Dula was ceremonially "acquitted" of all charges by Wilkes County after a petition was sent around Wilkes County and to the county seat. However, this action was unofficial and had no legal standing.

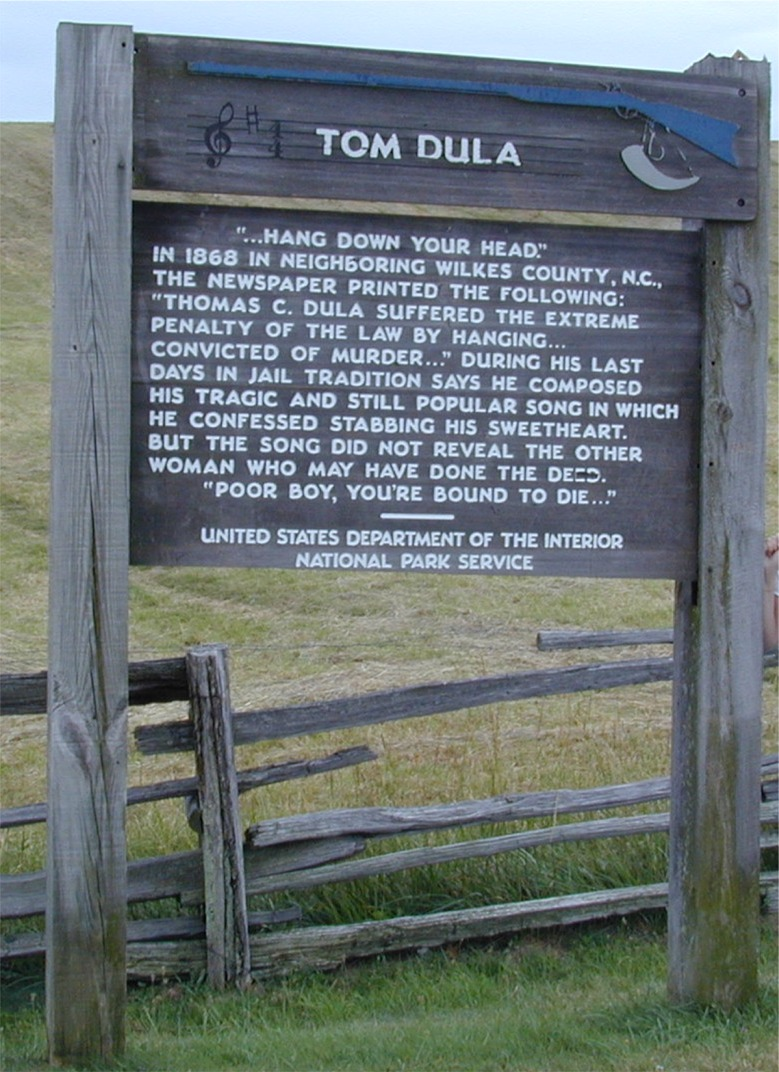
Sign along the Blue Ridge Parkway in Wilkes County, North Carolina

=== Myths ===
Much legend and folklore has grown around the tragedy and the life of Tom Dula. Not least of these is that Dula came through the war without a scratch, with Governor Vance making use of Dula's supposed talents with a banjo for his own entertainment. Both Dula's and Vance's accounts, as well as Dula's own military record, show this to be untrue. Nonetheless, the myth has persisted to the present day.

Another myth holds that while Dula was fighting in Virginia, Anne – apparently despairing of ever seeing Tom again – met and married an older farmer, James Melton. In fact, she had married Melton in 1859, three years before Tom left for the war, though that may not have changed the nature of her relationship with Dula.

A final tale is that Anne Melton confessed to the murder on her deathbed. She allegedly confessed to having killed Laura in a fit of jealousy and begged Tom to help her conceal the body. People in the area still say that, on her deathbed, Anne saw black cats on the walls and could hear and smell bacon frying.

== In popular culture ==
=== Music ===
- Thomas Land is believed to have written a song about the tragedy titled "Tom Dooley" (which was how Dula's name was pronounced) shortly after Dula was hanged. This, combined with the widespread publicity the trial received, further cemented Dula's place in North Carolina legend.
- Stonewall Jackson's U.S. country music and Billboard hit song "Waterloo" (1959) makes reference to Tom Dooley in the final verse.
- The music project Windows to Sky featuring SJ Tucker released a version of "Tom Dooley" titled "Tom Dula: Madness Made Us Wild; a Play in Five Verses and a Hanging" (2012), which combines elements of several versions of the story and song, and adapts quotes from the original court transcripts as lyrics. They describe it as "our original reinvention of the 'Tom Dula' story for the Neil Young Americana Contest, June 2012".
- Bob Dylan's song "Murder Most Foul" (2020) makes reference to Tom Dooley.

=== Other ===
- Michael Landon portrayed Dula in the movie The Legend of Tom Dooley (1959).
