= Trade, Tennessee =

Trade
- Unincorporated community
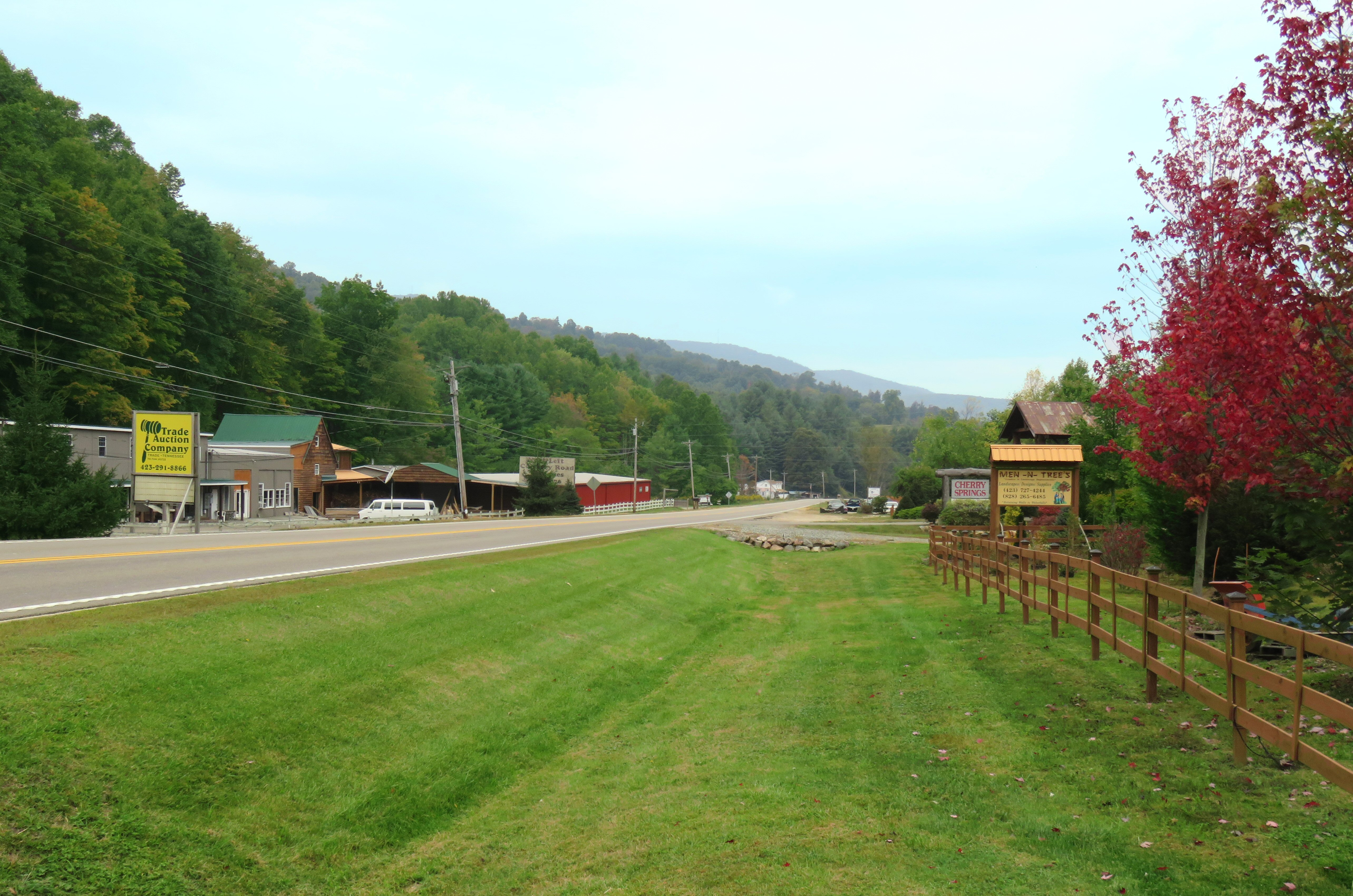
- Businesses along US 421 in Trade

- Location within Tennessee Location within the United States
- Coordinates: 36°20′57″N 81°44′44″W
- Country: United States
- State: Tennessee
- County: Johnson
- Elevation: 3,133 ft (955 m)
- Time zone: UTC-5 (Eastern (EST))
  - Summer (DST): UTC-4 (EDT)
- ZIP code: 37691
- Area code: 423
- GNIS feature ID: 1272826

Trade is an unincorporated community in Johnson County, Tennessee. The easternmost community in the state, Trade is located between the towns of Mountain City, Tennessee, and Boone, North Carolina, along US 421. Generally considered Tennessee's oldest community, Trade was established as a trading outpost in the 18th century, and was visited by English-speakers as early as 1673. At an elevation of 3,133 feet, it is the highest community in Tennessee.

== History ==
The oldest unincorporated community in the state of Tennessee, Trade originated in the 18th century as "The Trade Gap," a trading post established for Native Americans, pioneers, and fur traders to buy and sell their wares. It was located on an old buffalo trail between Snake and Rich Mountains, the easiest route through the mountains to the West. The first English-speakers visited what is now Trade as early as 1673, when the Needham and Arthur expedition passed through the area.

Tom Dula (made famous by the folk song "Tom Dooley") hid out in Trade as he was on the run, suspected of having murdered Laura Foster in Wilkes County, North Carolina. It was in Trade that the posse finally caught up to Dula and arrested him. Dula was working on Grayson farm. He stated, "if it hadn't been for Grayson I'd have been in Tennessee", when he was captured in Trade.

== Geography ==
Trade lies in the upper Roan Creek Valley between Snake Mountain to the east, Stone Mountain to the northwest, and Fork Ridge to the southwest. The border between Tennessee and North Carolina passes immediately to the south and atop Snake Mountain to the east. The community of Zionville lies opposite the border to the south.

== Culture ==
The Trade Days festival, a three-day festival of Appalachian arts, crafts, culture, and history, was held in Trade each June since 1989. The festival also featured Appalachian music, dance, and a Native American pow-wow. Additionally, vendors sold unique items such as jewelry and art. Profits from the festival were used to improve and expand the Trade Community Center and Park. The festival was halted for close to a decade and were supposed to resume in 2020, but were put on pause again due to Covid-19.

In 2008, the Trade gristmill celebrated its grand opening. Most of the parts comprising the newly constructed mill date back to pre-Civil War. The gristmill is located on the grounds of Trade Days and the Trade Community Center and is open to the public. A variety of products are available for purchase, including popcorn grits and featured art by local talent.

== Notable people ==
- Stanley A. Harris, Boy Scouts of America executive

== See also ==
- Snake Mountain
