= North Fork New River =

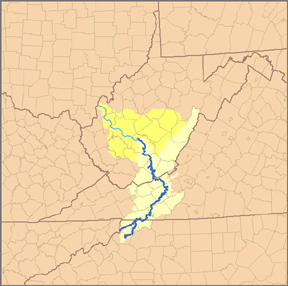
- Map of the Kanawha River watershed, with the New River and its watershed highlighted.

Location
- Country: United States
- State: North Carolina
- Counties: Watauga, Alleghany, Ashe

Physical characteristics
- Source: Elk Knob (Watauga County, North Carolina)
  - location: Watauga County, NC
  - coordinates: 36°19′59″N 81°41′04″W
  - elevation: 4,446 ft (1,355 m)
- Mouth: New River
  - location: Ashe County, NC
  - coordinates: 36°32′45″N 81°21′47″W
  - elevation: 2,546 ft (776 m)

The North Fork New River is a river in the U.S. state of North Carolina. It rises in Northern Watauga County, and flows northeast to Ashe County where it joins with the South Fork New River to form the New River.

== See also ==
- New River
- South Fork New River
