= Watauga County, North Carolina =

County in North Carolina, United States

- County
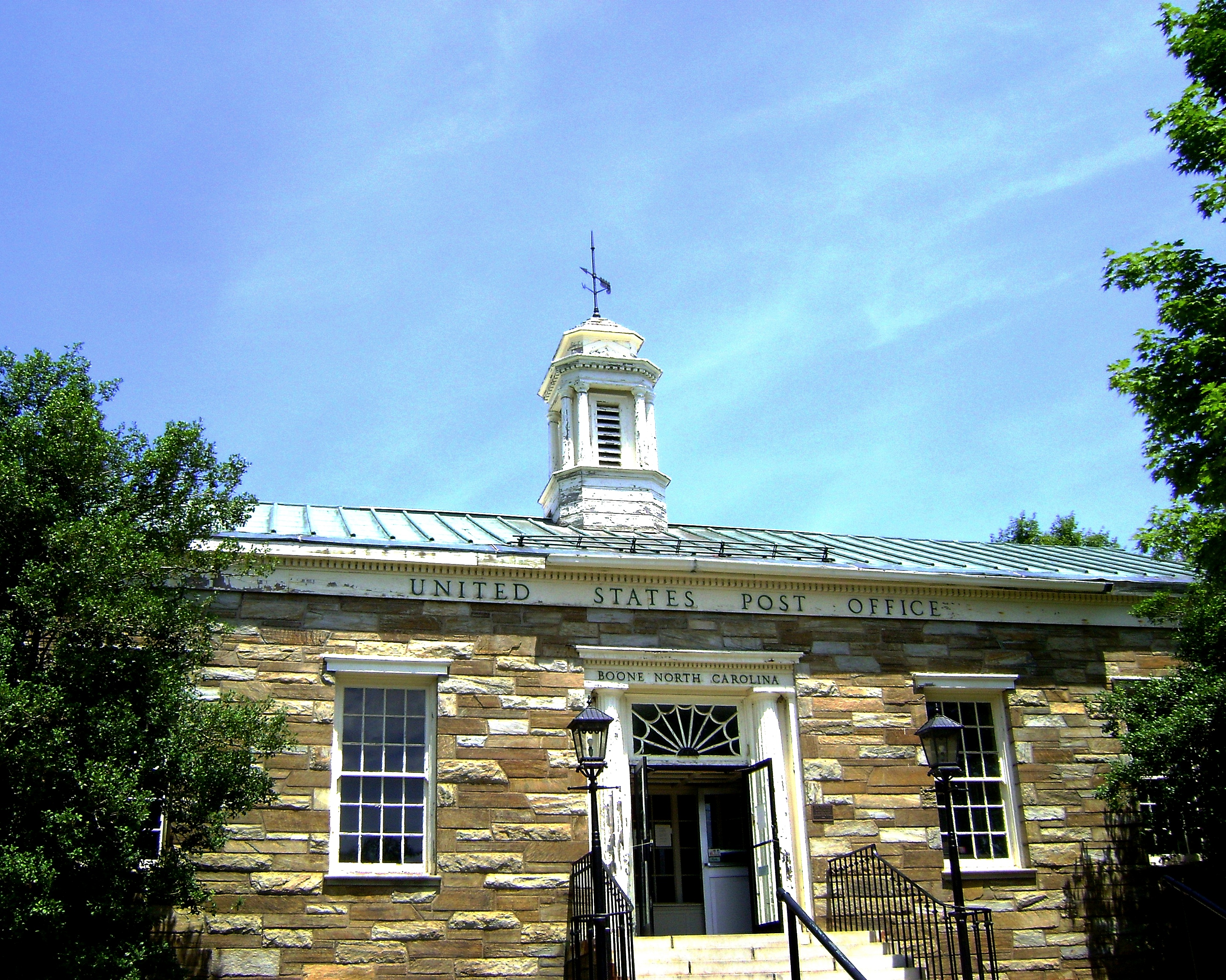
- United States Post Office in Boone

- Seal

- Location within the U.S. state of North Carolina
- Coordinates: 36.24°N 81.71°W
- Country: United States
- State: North Carolina
- Founded: 1849
- Named for: Watauga River
- Seat: Boone
- Largest community: Boone

Area
  - Total: 313.32 sq mi (811.5 km^{2})
  - Land: 312.44 sq mi (809.2 km^{2})
  - Water: 0.88 sq mi (2.3 km^{2}) 0.28%

Population (2020)
  - Total: 54,086
  - Estimate (2025): 54,786 ▲
  - Density: 173.11/sq mi (66.84/km^{2})
- Time zone: UTC−5 (Eastern)
  - Summer (DST): UTC−4 (EDT)
- Congressional district: 5th
- Website: www.wataugacounty.org

Watauga County (/wəˈtɔːɡə/ wuh-TAW-guh) is a county located in the U.S. state of North Carolina. The population was 54,086 at the 2020 census. Its county seat and largest community is Boone. The county is in an exceptionally mountainous region, known as the High Country. It is the home of Appalachian State University, which has approximately 21,570 students as of Fall 2024. Watauga County comprises the Boone, NC Micropolitan Statistical Area.

== History ==
The county was formed in 1849 from parts of Ashe, Caldwell, Wilkes, and Yancey counties. It was named for the Watauga River, whose name is said to be a Native American word. Meanings include "beautiful water," "whispering waters," "village of many springs," and "river of islands."

== Geography ==
Interactive map of Watauga County

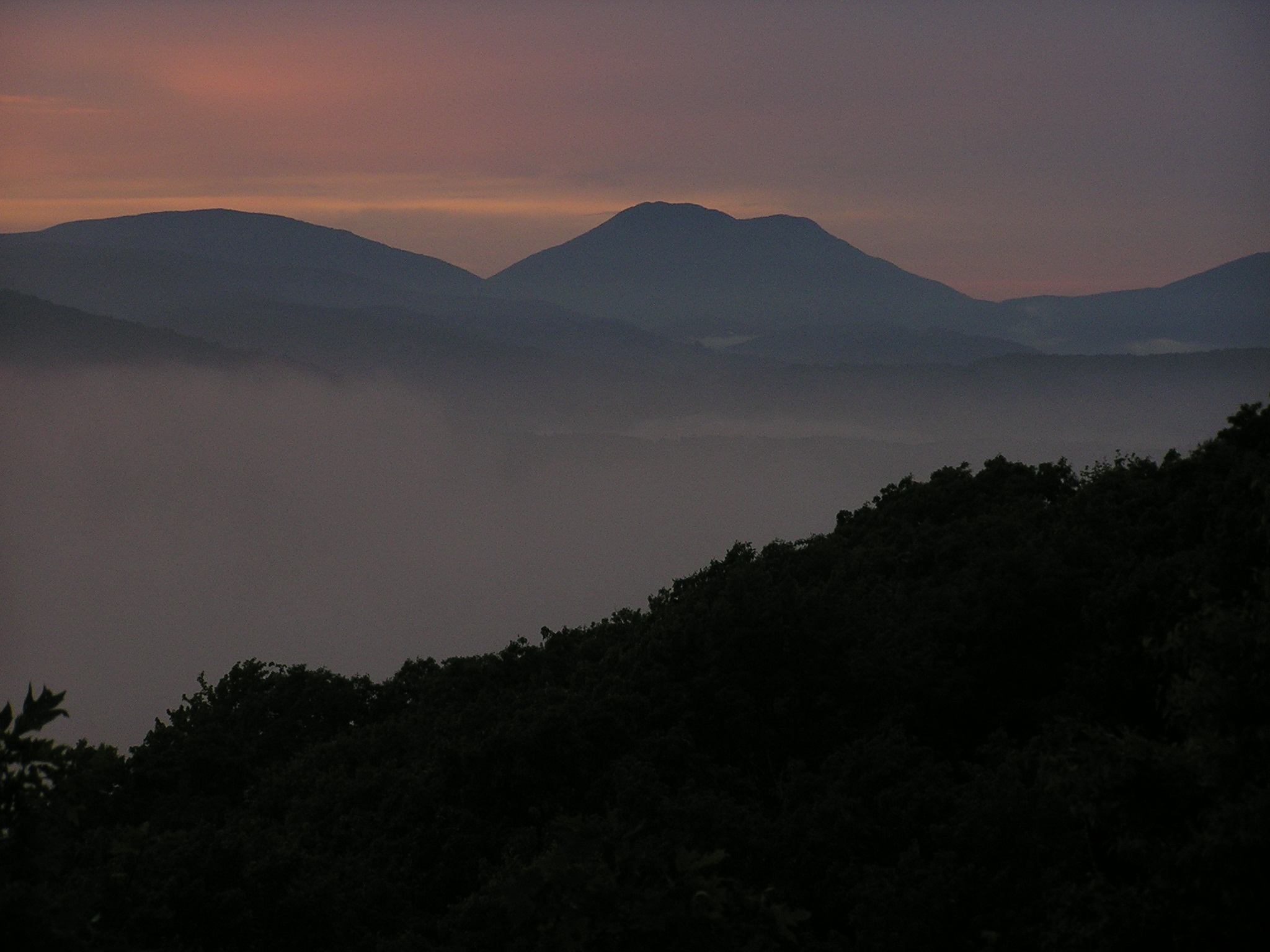
Snake Mountain (5,564 feet [1,696 m]) in northern Watauga County

According to the U.S. Census Bureau, the county has a total area of 313.32 square miles (811.5 km^{2}), of which 312.44 square miles (809.2 km^{2}) is land and 0.88 square miles (2.3 km^{2}) (0.28%) is water.

Watauga County is extremely mountainous, and all of the county's terrain is located within the Appalachian Mountains range. The highest point in the county is Calloway Peak, the highest peak of Grandfather Mountain (shared with the adjacent counties of Avery and Caldwell), which rises to 5,964 feet (1,818 meters) above sea level. At an elevation of 5,506 feet (1,678 meters) above sea level, Beech Mountain is the highest incorporated community east of the Mississippi River. Boone, the county's largest city and county seat, has the highest elevation (3,333 feet) of any city over 10,000 population in the Eastern United States.

Isolated by mountainous terrain from the remainder of North Carolina to the east, Watauga County was described in the 19th and early 20th centuries as one of the Lost Provinces of North Carolina.

=== National protected areas ===
- Blue Ridge Parkway (part)
- Julian Price Memorial Park
- Moses H. Cone Memorial Park
- Pisgah National Forest (part)

=== State and local protected areas ===
- Beech Creek Bog State Natural Area
- Elk Knob Game Land
- Elk Knob State Park (part)
- Foscoe Grandfather Community Center
- Grandfather Mountain State Park (part)
- Green Valley Community Park
- Pisgah National Forest Game Land (part)
- Turtle Island Preserve

=== Major water bodies ===
- Buckeye Creek
- Craborchard Creek
- Howard Creek
- Laurel Creek
- Meadow Creek
- North Fork New River
- Sharp Creek
- South Fork New River
- Watauga River
- Yadkin River

=== Adjacent counties ===
- Ashe County – northeast
- Wilkes County – east
- Caldwell County – south
- Avery County – southwest
- Johnson County, Tennessee – northwest

== Climate ==
As with most of North Carolina's High Country, the climate of Watauga County is that of a humid continental climate, characterized by considerably cooler and more extreme weather than in other parts of the state. Dramatic and unexpected changes in the weather are not uncommon in the county, particularly for precipitation. This is partly due to the elevation of the county, and partly due to orographic lifting, which causes precipitation to fall more readily in Watauga County than in lowland areas to the south and east. Summers can be very warm, with temperatures commonly near 80 °F and occasionally (although infrequently) approaching 90 °F. Snow usually starts in November, tapering off by March, and occasional snowfall occurs in April. Windy conditions tend to be amplified across the county due to the rugged terrain and high elevation.

=== Ski resorts ===
Because of the cold winter climate in Watauga County, the area is home to several ski resorts.

- Appalachian Ski Mountain
- Beech Mountain Resort
- Sugar Mountain Resort

== Transportation ==
Watauga County, like much of the High Country, has no interstate highway. The county is served by state highways maintained by the North Carolina Department of Transportation. The Blue Ridge Parkway in eastern portions of Watauga is sometimes used as a commuter route due to its proximity to populated areas—for example, it is the fastest route between the unincorporated community of Bamboo and the town of Blowing Rock.

=== Major highways ===
- US 221
- US 321
- US 421
- NC 88
- NC 105
- NC 184
- NC 194
- Blue Ridge Parkway

=== Airport ===
A small general aviation airstrip (FAA Identifier: NC14) is located in Boone. However, it has no scheduled commercial service. As such, commercial airline passengers must typically utilize the airports at Charlotte, Greensboro in North Carolina, or the Tri-Cities in Tennessee.

=== Public Transportation ===
There is a public transport system in Boone provided by AppalCART that services the downtown and some outlying areas at no cost, in addition to paratransit, and rural route services for a small fee. Sunway Charters, a charter bus company, operates in cooperation with Greyhound Lines to provide coach bus service from Boone to Charlotte and Greensboro, called the Mountaineer North–South and the Mountaineer East–West, respectively.

== Demographics ==
Historical population
Census	Pop.	Note	%±
1850	3,400		—
1860	4,957		45.8%
1870	5,287		6.7%
1880	8,160		54.3%
1890	10,611		30.0%
1900	13,417		26.4%
1910	13,556		1.0%
1920	13,477		−0.6%
1930	15,165		12.5%
1940	18,114		19.4%
1950	18,342		1.3%
1960	17,529		−4.4%
1970	23,404		33.5%
1980	31,666		35.3%
1990	36,952		16.7%
2000	42,695		15.5%
2010	51,079		19.6%
2020	54,086		5.9%
2025 (est.)	54,786	▲	1.3%
U.S. Decennial Census; 1790–1960 1900–1990; 1990–2000 2010 2020

=== 2024 census ===
Watauga County, North Carolina Population 2026

White: 50,349 92.32% Two or more races: 1,737 3.18% Black or African American: 981 1.8% Asian: 767 1.41% Other race: 348 0.64% Native American: 339 0.62% Native Hawaiian: 19 0.03%

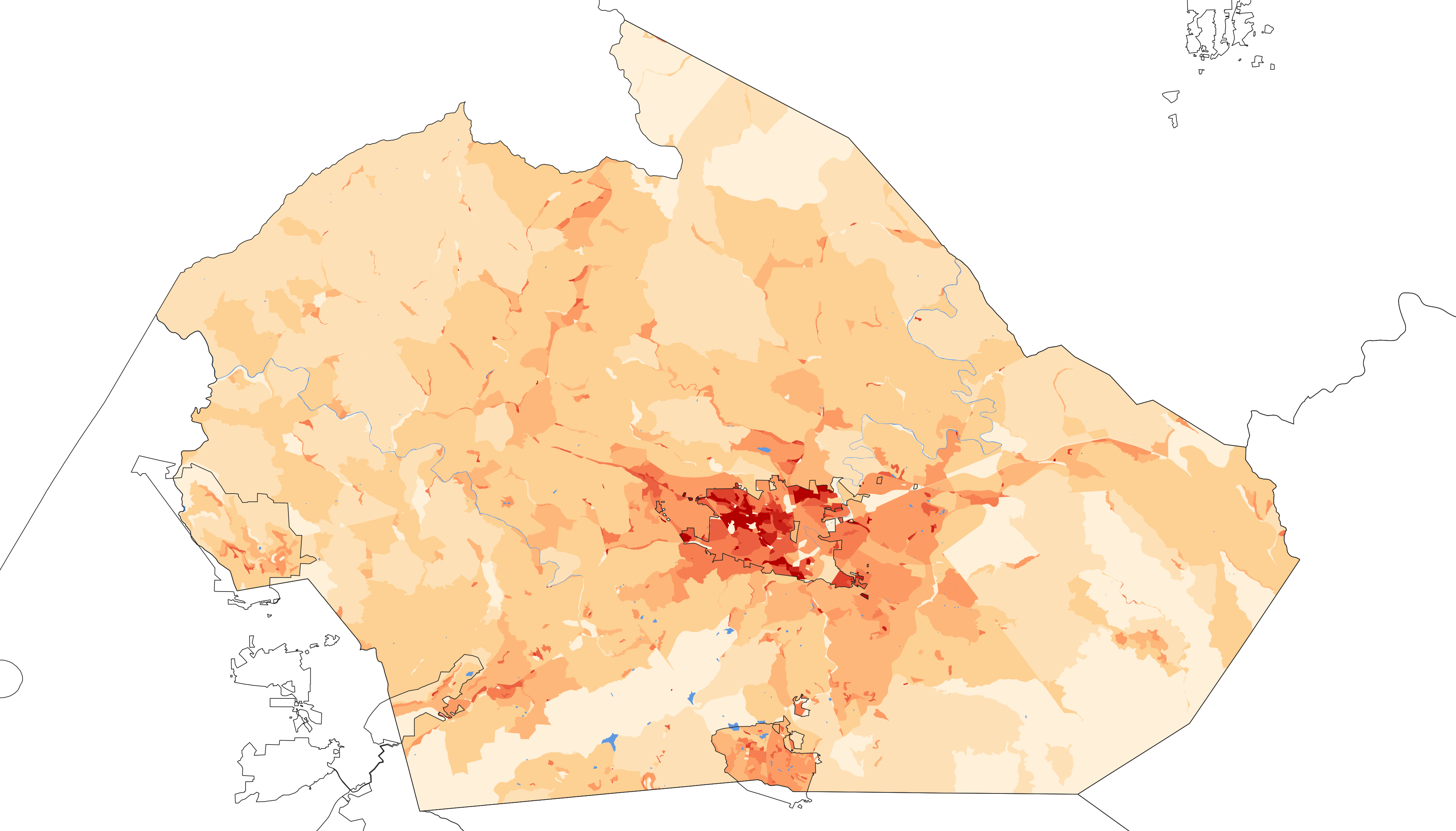
2020 population density of Watauga County NC by census block

=== Racial and ethnic composition ===
Watauga County, North Carolina – Racial and ethnic composition Note: the US Census treats Hispanic/Latino as an ethnic category. This table excludes Latinos from the racial categories and assigns them to a separate category. Hispanics/Latinos may be of any race.
Race / Ethnicity (NH = Non-Hispanic)	Pop 1980	Pop 1990	Pop 2000	Pop 2010	Pop 2020	% 1980	% 1990	% 2000	% 2010	% 2020
White alone (NH)	30,936	35,725	40,744	47,268	44,986	97.69%	96.68%	95.43%	92.54%	83.17%
Black or African American alone (NH)	425	766	673	855	2,101	1.34%	2.07%	1.58%	1.67%	3.88%
Native American or Alaska Native alone (NH)	23	56	95	117	82	0.07%	0.15%	0.22%	0.23%	0.15%
Asian alone (NH)	79	152	251	467	938	0.25%	0.41%	0.59%	0.91%	1.73%
Native Hawaiian or Pacific Islander alone (NH)	x	x	15	13	11	x	x	0.04%	0.03%	0.02%
Other race alone (NH)	25	4	51	54	438	0.08%	0.01%	0.12%	0.11%	0.81%
Mixed race or Multiracial (NH)	x	x	244	592	2,009	x	x	0.57%	1.16%	3.71%
Hispanic or Latino (any race)	178	249	622	1,713	3,521	0.56%	0.67%	1.46%	3.35%	6.51%
Total	31,666	36,952	42,695	51,079	54,086	100.00%	100.00%	100.00%	100.00%	100.00%

=== 2020 census ===
As of the 2020 census, the county had a population of 54,086 and a median age of 29.4 years; 13.9% of residents were under the age of 18 and 16.6% were 65 years of age or older. For every 100 females there were 91.8 males, and for every 100 females age 18 and over there were 89.9 males.

The racial makeup of the county was 84.5% White, 4.0% Black or African American, 0.2% American Indian and Alaska Native, 1.7% Asian, less than 0.1% Native Hawaiian and Pacific Islander, 4.0% from some other race, and 5.5% from two or more races. Hispanic or Latino residents of any race comprised 6.5% of the population.

51.1% of residents lived in urban areas, while 48.9% lived in rural areas.

There were 21,413 households in the county, of which 19.6% had children under the age of 18 living in them. Of all households, 40.8% were married-couple households, 23.8% were households with a male householder and no spouse or partner present, and 29.6% were households with a female householder and no spouse or partner present. About 31.7% of all households were made up of individuals and 10.3% had someone living alone who was 65 years of age or older.

There were 32,637 housing units, of which 34.4% were vacant. Among occupied housing units, 56.5% were owner-occupied and 43.5% were renter-occupied. The homeowner vacancy rate was 2.1% and the rental vacancy rate was 10.7%.

=== 2000 census ===
At the 2000 census, there were 42,695 people, 16,540 households, and 9,411 families residing in the county. The population density was 137 people per square mile (53 people/km^{2}). There were 23,155 housing units at an average density of 74 units per square mile (29 units/km^{2}). The racial makeup of the county was 96.45% White, 1.59% Black or African American, 0.25% Native American, 0.59% Asian, 0.04% Pacific Islander, 0.45% from other races, and 0.62% from two or more races. 1.46% of the population were Hispanics or Latinos of any race.

According to the 2000 Census the largest self-reported ancestry groups in Watauga County were: English (25.1%), German (22.5%) and Irish (13.3%). Most of those claiming Irish ancestry in Watauga county are actually of Scots-Irish/Ulster-Scots Protestant background and not Irish Catholics.

There were 16,540 households, out of which 23.20% had children under the age of 18 living with them, 47.40% were married couples living together, 6.80% had a female householder with no husband present, and 43.10% were non-families. 28.60% of all households were made up of individuals, and 8.00% had someone living alone who was 65 years of age or older. The average household size was 2.26 and the average family size was 2.80.

The age distribution is 16.30% under the age of 18, 27.80% from 18 to 24, 23.40% from 25 to 44, 21.50% from 45 to 64, and 11.00% who were 65 years of age or older. The median age was 30 years. The overall age distribution and median age are greatly affected by the presence of Appalachian State University in Boone. For every 100 females there are 99.30 males. For every 100 females age 18 and over, there were 98.20 males.

The median income for a household in the county was $32,611, and the median income for a family was $45,508. Males had a median income of $29,135 versus $22,006 for females. The per capita income for the county was $17,258. About 7.20% of families and 17.90% of the population were below the poverty line, including 11.50% of those under age 18 and 10.60% of those age 65 or over.

== Government, public safety, and politics ==
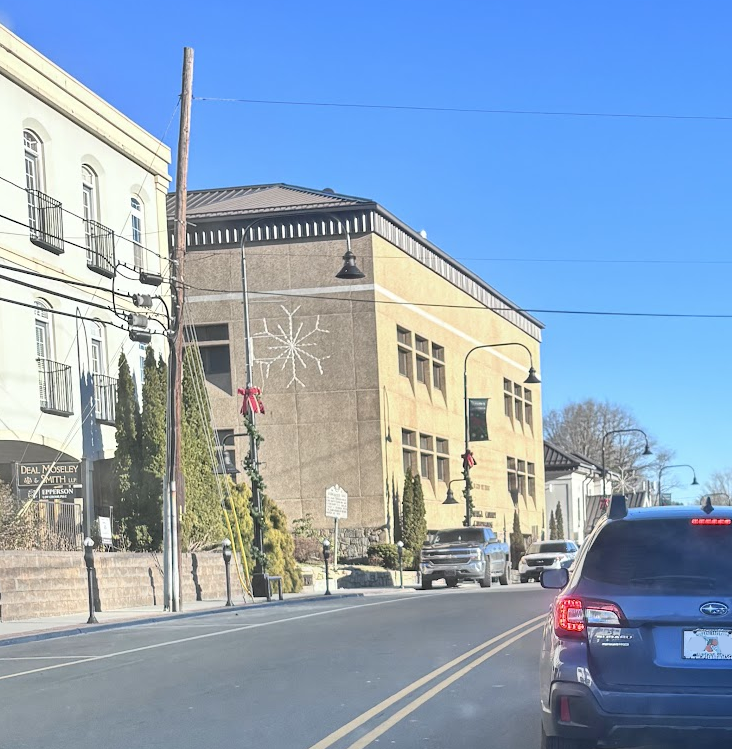
A view of the Watauga County Courthouse on King Street, downtown Boone

=== Government ===
Watauga County is governed by an elected Board of Commissioners who provide administration policy for the appointed County Manager.

Watauga County is a member of the regional High Country Council of Governments.

=== Public safety ===
==== County sheriff and municipal police ====
The Sheriff's Office provides court protection, jail management, and protection of all county owned facilities for all of Watauga County and patrol and detective services for the unincorporated areas of the county. The towns of Boone, Beech Mountain, Blowing Rock, and Seven Devils have municipal police departments.

==== Fire protection and emergency services ====
Fire protection is provided by 13 fire departments in Watauga County including Beaver Dam, Boone, Beech Mountain, Cove Creek, Deep Gap, Foscoe, Meat Camp, Shawneehaw, Stewart, Simmons, Todd, and Zionville. The Emergency Management Office coordinates resources for emergency services and also provides countywide EMS service.

=== Politics ===
Historically, Watauga's strong Unionist sympathies – though not as strong as North Carolina highland-mountain counties like Avery and Mitchell, or counties with Quaker, antislavery histories like Yadkin – meant the county voted mainly Republican during the Solid South Democrat era, except in Presidential landslides. The only Democrats to gain an absolute majority of the county's vote in the 20th century were Franklin Roosevelt in 1932 and 1936, and by a very narrow margin, Lyndon B. Johnson in 1964, while Woodrow Wilson in 1912 and Bill Clinton in 1992 obtained pluralities in three-cornered contests. The growth of Appalachian State University, with its predominantly left-leaning electorate, has strengthened the Democratic Party's standing and it carried the county in 2008, 2016, 2020 and 2024. The county has also proved favorable for Libertarians, with Watauga being Gary Johnson's best county in all of North Carolina in both his 2012 and 2016 campaigns.

United States presidential election results for Watauga County, North Carolina
Year	Republican		Democratic		Third party(ies)	
Year	No.	%	No.	%	No.	%
1912	420	19.32%	933	42.92%	821	37.76%
1916	1,352	54.23%	1,141	45.77%	0	0.00%
1920	2,631	60.45%	1,721	39.55%	0	0.00%
1924	2,665	52.90%	2,365	46.94%	8	0.16%
1928	3,159	54.94%	2,591	45.06%	0	0.00%
1932	3,166	47.93%	3,419	51.76%	21	0.32%
1936	3,409	46.77%	3,880	53.23%	0	0.00%
1940	3,739	50.84%	3,615	49.16%	0	0.00%
1944	3,954	55.16%	3,214	44.84%	0	0.00%
1948	3,851	52.04%	3,379	45.66%	170	2.30%
1952	4,527	55.70%	3,600	44.30%	0	0.00%
1956	4,636	58.99%	3,223	41.01%	0	0.00%
1960	5,020	59.34%	3,440	40.66%	0	0.00%
1964	3,932	49.38%	4,031	50.62%	0	0.00%
1968	5,081	55.88%	2,952	32.46%	1,060	11.66%
1972	6,017	62.85%	3,451	36.05%	105	1.10%
1976	5,400	49.92%	5,358	49.53%	59	0.55%
1980	6,149	51.42%	5,022	42.00%	787	6.58%
1984	9,370	64.27%	5,163	35.41%	46	0.32%
1988	8,662	58.59%	6,048	40.91%	75	0.51%
1992	7,899	41.09%	8,262	42.98%	3,064	15.94%
1996	8,146	47.30%	7,349	42.67%	1,727	10.03%
2000	10,438	55.75%	7,959	42.51%	326	1.74%
2004	12,659	52.64%	11,232	46.70%	159	0.66%
2008	13,344	47.03%	14,558	51.31%	470	1.66%
2012	13,861	50.09%	13,002	46.98%	811	2.93%
2016	13,697	45.68%	14,138	47.15%	2,150	7.17%
2020	14,451	44.85%	17,122	53.14%	647	2.01%
2024	15,254	46.09%	17,225	52.05%	616	1.86%

== Economy ==
Some notable examples of the county's economy are:

- The county produces significant amounts of Fraser fir Christmas trees.
- The growth of produce was once a mainstay in the agricultural economy of the county. Cabbage was once widely grown, so much so, that a sauerkraut plant was once located in Boone. The plant has long been closed. Boone Creek, the main creek that runs through Boone and the Appalachian State University campus is still nicknamed Kraut Creek since it is said that the creek used to smell of sauerkraut juice coming out of the plant.
- The Watauga County Farmers' Market has been operating in Boone since 1974.
- The Beech Mountain Resort is one of the few ski resorts operating in the Southeastern United States.
- Appalachian State University is a major economic driver for the county and the region as a whole, generating US$2.2 billion in statewide impact and US$573 million in local impact as of 2022.

== Education ==
=== K–8 schools ===
- Bethel
- Blowing Rock
- Cove Creek
- Grace Academy
- Green Valley
- Hardin Park
- Mabel
- Mountain Pathways Montessori School
- Parkway
- Two Rivers Community School
- Valle Crucis

=== High school ===
- Watauga High School

=== Colleges and universities ===
- Appalachian State University, part of the University of North Carolina System and enrolls more than 21,000 students
- Caldwell Community College & Technical Institute, satellite campus

== Communities ==
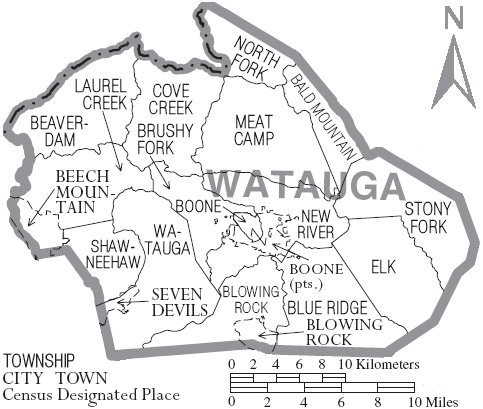
Map of Watauga County with municipal and township labels

=== Towns ===
- Beech Mountain
- Blowing Rock
- Boone (county seat and largest community)
- Seven Devils

=== Census-designated places ===
- Cove Creek
- Foscoe
- Valle Crucis

=== Unincorporated communities ===
- Aho
- Bamboo
- Deep Gap
- Matney
- Meat Camp
- Sherwood
- Silverstone
- Sugar Grove
- Todd
- Vilas
- Zionville

=== Former communities ===
- Shulls Mill

=== Townships ===
- Bald Mountain
- Beaverdam
- Blowing Rock
- Blue Ridge
- Boone
- Brushy Fork
- Cove Creek
- Elk
- Laurel Creek
- Meat Camp
- New River
- North Fork
- Shawneehaw
- Stony Fork
- Watauga

== See also ==
- List of North Carolina counties
- National Register of Historic Places listings in Watauga County, North Carolina
