= South Fork New River =

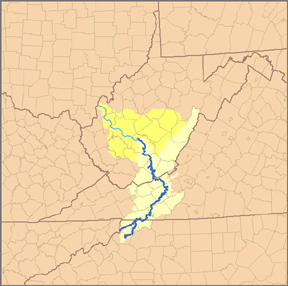
- Map of the Kanawha River watershed, with the New River and its watershed highlighted.

Location
- Country: United States
- State: North Carolina
- Counties: Watauga, Alleghany, Ashe

Physical characteristics
- Source: Middle Fork South Fork New River
  - location: Blowing Rock, NC
  - coordinates: 36°07′34″N 81°40′20″W
  - elevation: 3,543 ft (1,080 m)
- 2nd source: East Fork South Fork New River
  - location: Watauga County, NC
  - coordinates: 36°10′56″N 81°36′37″W
  - elevation: 3,271 ft (997 m)
- Source confluence
  - location: Boone, NC
  - coordinates: 36°12′16″N 81°38′59″W
  - elevation: 3,104 ft (946 m)
- Mouth: New River
  - location: Ashe County, NC
  - coordinates: 36°32′46″N 81°21′11″W
  - elevation: 2,546 ft (776 m)
- Discharge
  - location: Jefferson, NC
  - average: 552 cu ft/s (15.6 m^{3}/s)
  - minimum: 227 cu ft/s (6.4 m^{3}/s)(1986)
  - maximum: 2,120 cu ft/s (60 m^{3}/s)(1998)

The South Fork New River is a river in the U.S. state of North Carolina.

It stretches from its headwaters at a spring near Blowing Rock and the Eastern Continental Divide and meanders northward along the northwestern face of the Blue Ridge Mountains through the eastern and central portions of Watauga County and then Ashe County in northwestern North Carolina, passing through the town of Boone. It joins the North Fork New River in Ashe County to form the New River. Its waters ultimately reach the Gulf of Mexico through the Kanawha River, the Ohio River, and the Mississippi River. Its tributaries include Winkler's Creek, Boone (Kraut) Creek and Payne Branch.

== Middle Fork ==
The Middle Fork runs between the towns of Blowing Rock and Boone and is fed by tributaries including the Aho Branch Creek (AY-ho). Due to industrial usage and highway widening projects in the 1970s, much of the Middle Fork was severely ecologically degraded. Since 2000, the Middle Fork Greenway project has been working to create a 6.5-mile recreational greenway between the two cities. Additionally, work is being done to restore native plants and damaged sections of the river.

== See also ==
- New River
- North Fork New River
