= William Skiles =

William Skiles may refer to:

- William W. Skiles, U.S. Representative from Ohio
- William West Skiles, American missionary
- William Vernon Skiles, professor of mathematics
- Bill Skiles, of American stand-up comedy act Skiles and Henderson
