= Valle Crucis Historic District =

Historic district in North Carolina, United States

- U.S. National Register of Historic Places
- U.S. Historic district
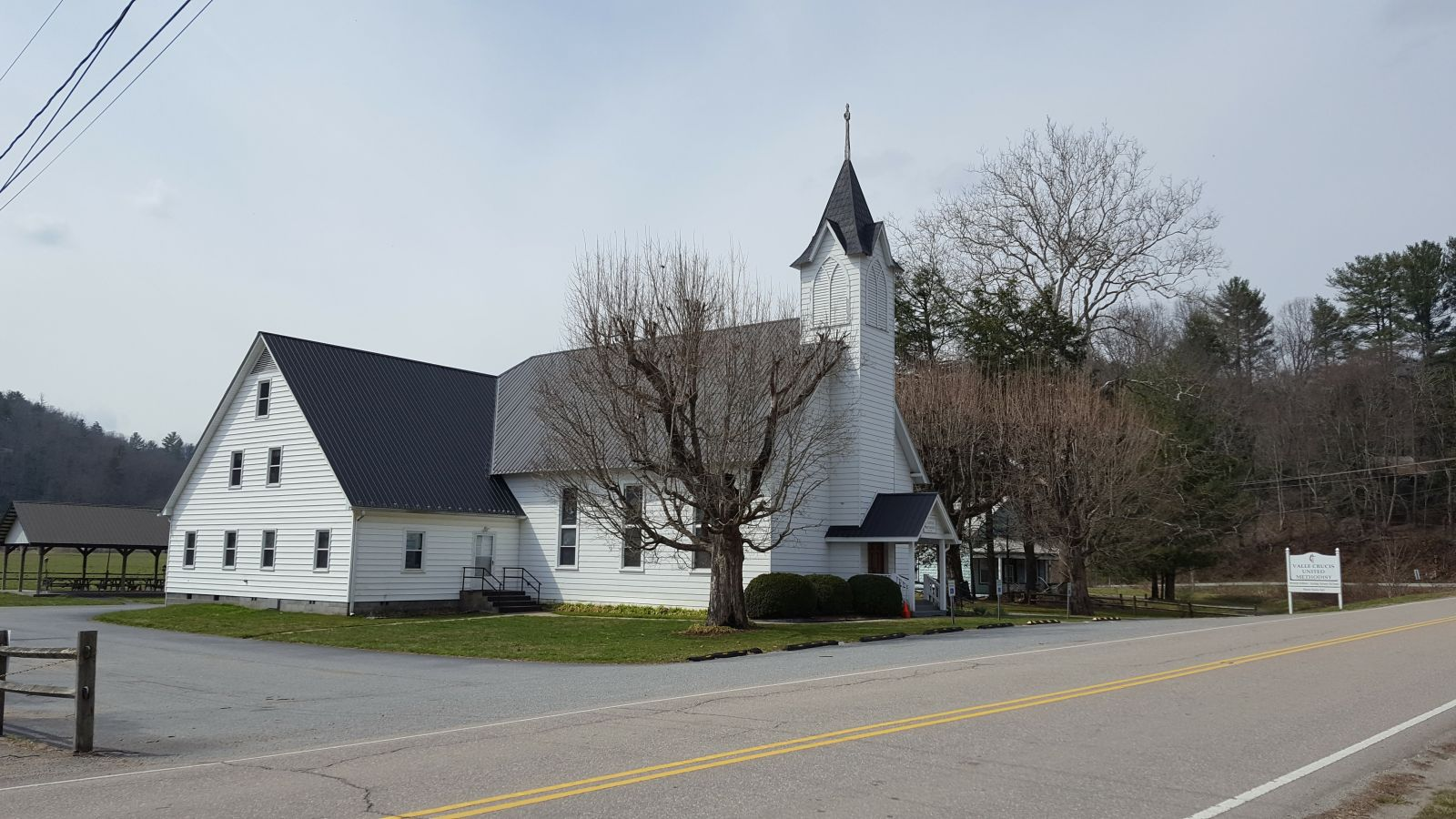
- Valle Crucis Methodist Church, 2017

- Location within North Carolina Location within the United States
- Location: Along NC 194 and NC 1112, Valle Crucis, North Carolina
- Coordinates: 36°12′33″N 81°46′43″W
- Area: 909 acres (368 ha)
- Architectural style: Gothic Revival, Bungalow/Craftsman, Colonial Revival
- NRHP reference No.: 04001600
- Added to NRHP: February 2, 2005

Valle Crucis Historic District is a national historic district located at Valle Crucis, Watauga County, North Carolina. The district encompasses 50 contributing buildings, 1 contributing site, and 7 contributing structures in the central business district and surrounding residential sections of Valle Crucis. It developed between about 1812 and 1954, and includes notable examples of Gothic Revival, Bungalow / American Craftsman, and Colonial Revival style architecture. Located in the district are the separately listed Mast General Store, Mast Farm, and Valle Crucis Episcopal Mission. Other notable contributing buildings are the Baird Farm (c. 1860, c. 1872), Lucy Mast Olsen House (1936–1940), Taylor tobacco barn, Farthing Store (1909), Valle Crucis Bank (1914), Hard Taylor House (c. 1855, 1895), and C. D. "Squire" Taylor House (1911).

It was listed on the National Register of Historic Places in 2005.

== Gallery ==
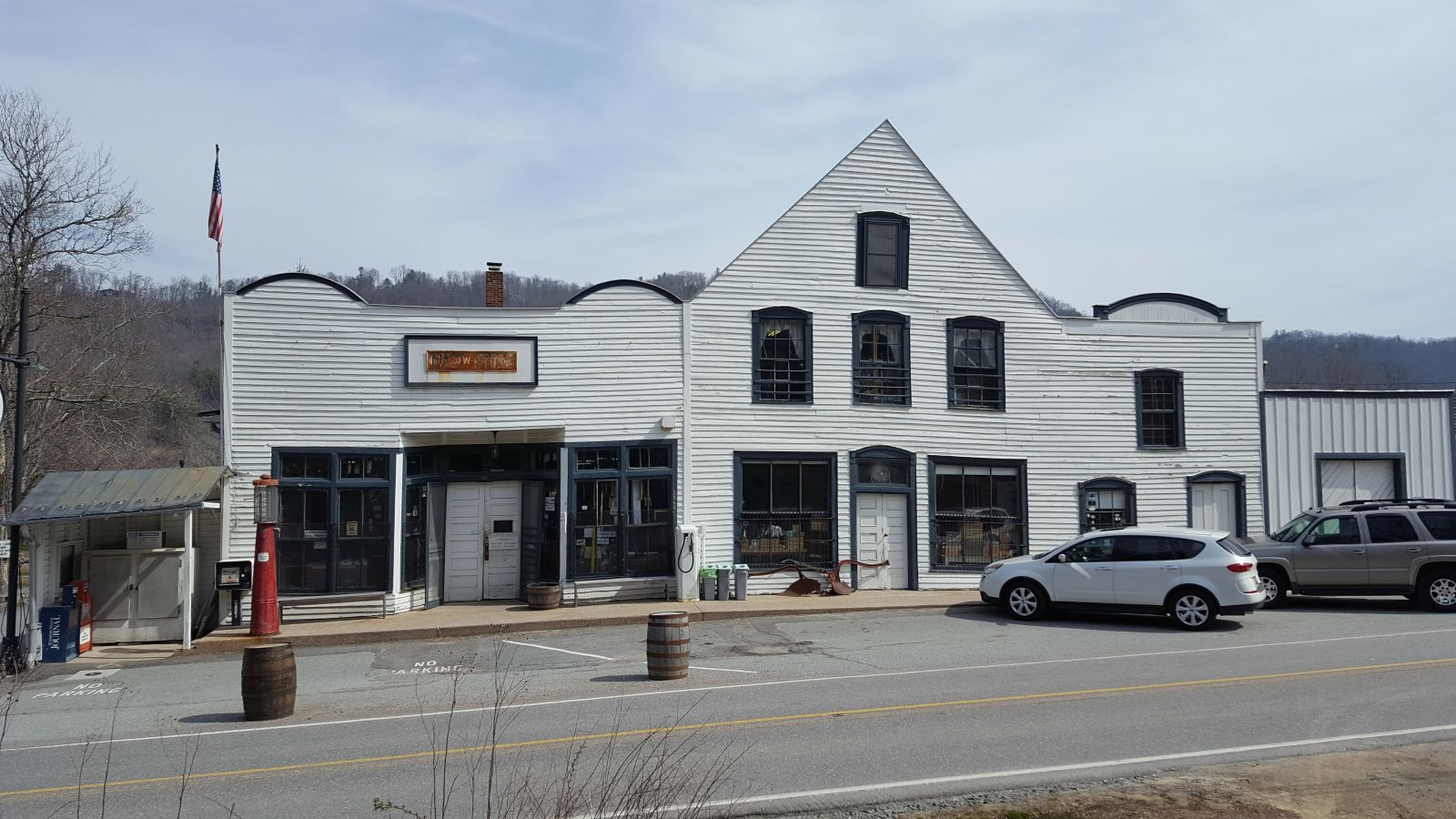
Mast General Store, 2017

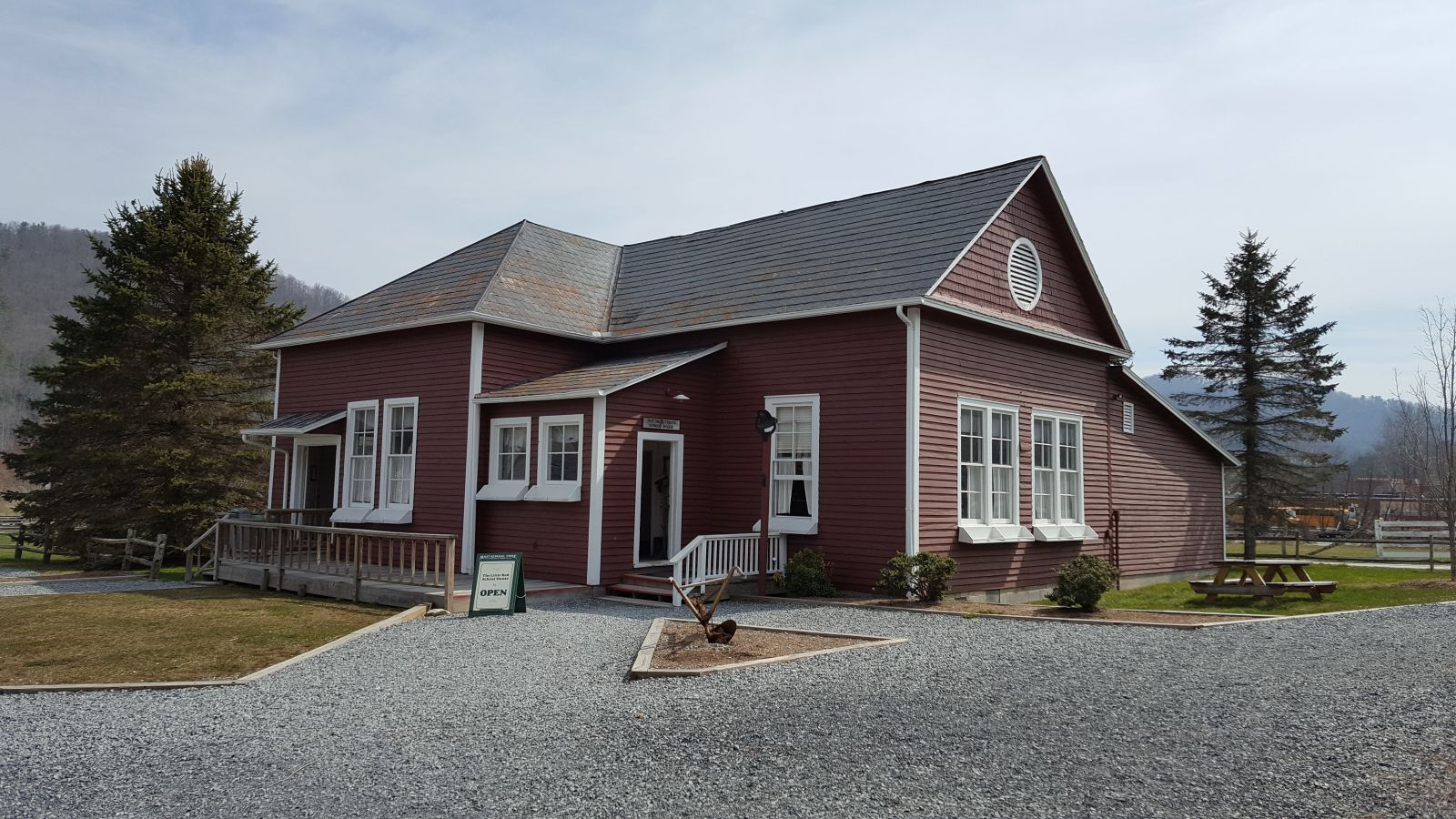
(former) Valle Crucis Academy, 2017

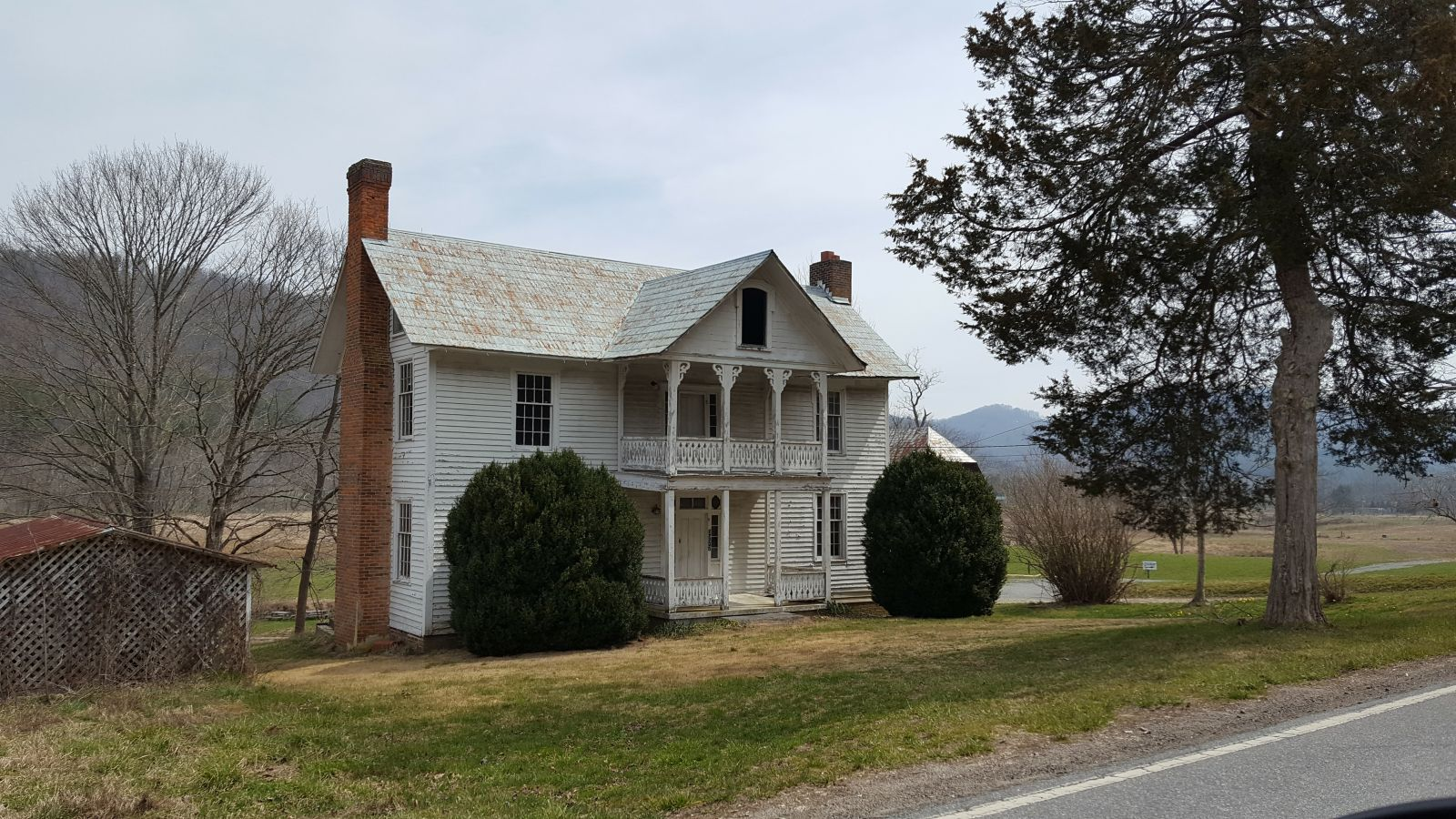
David F. Baird House, 2017

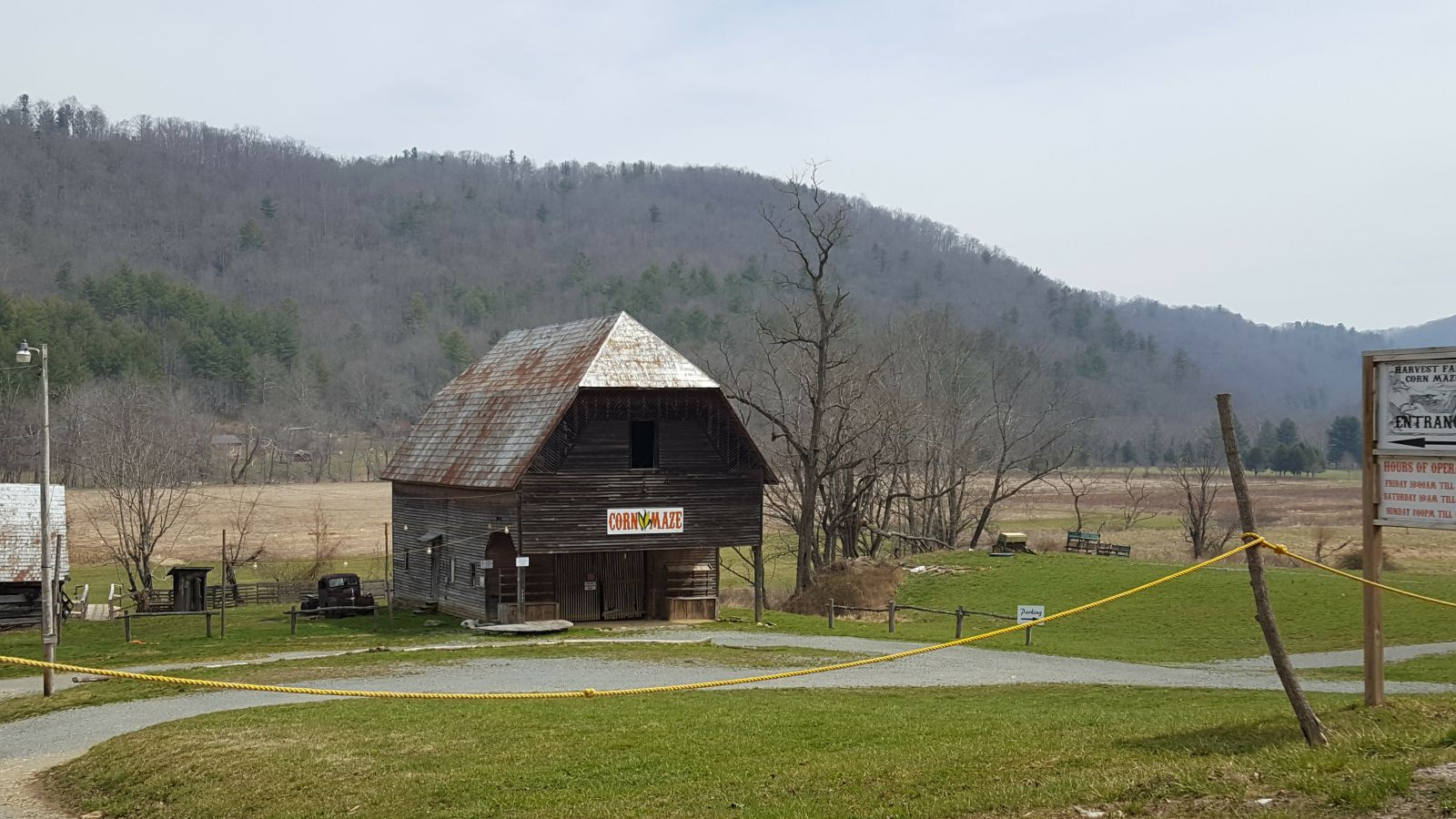
David F. Baird Barn, 2017

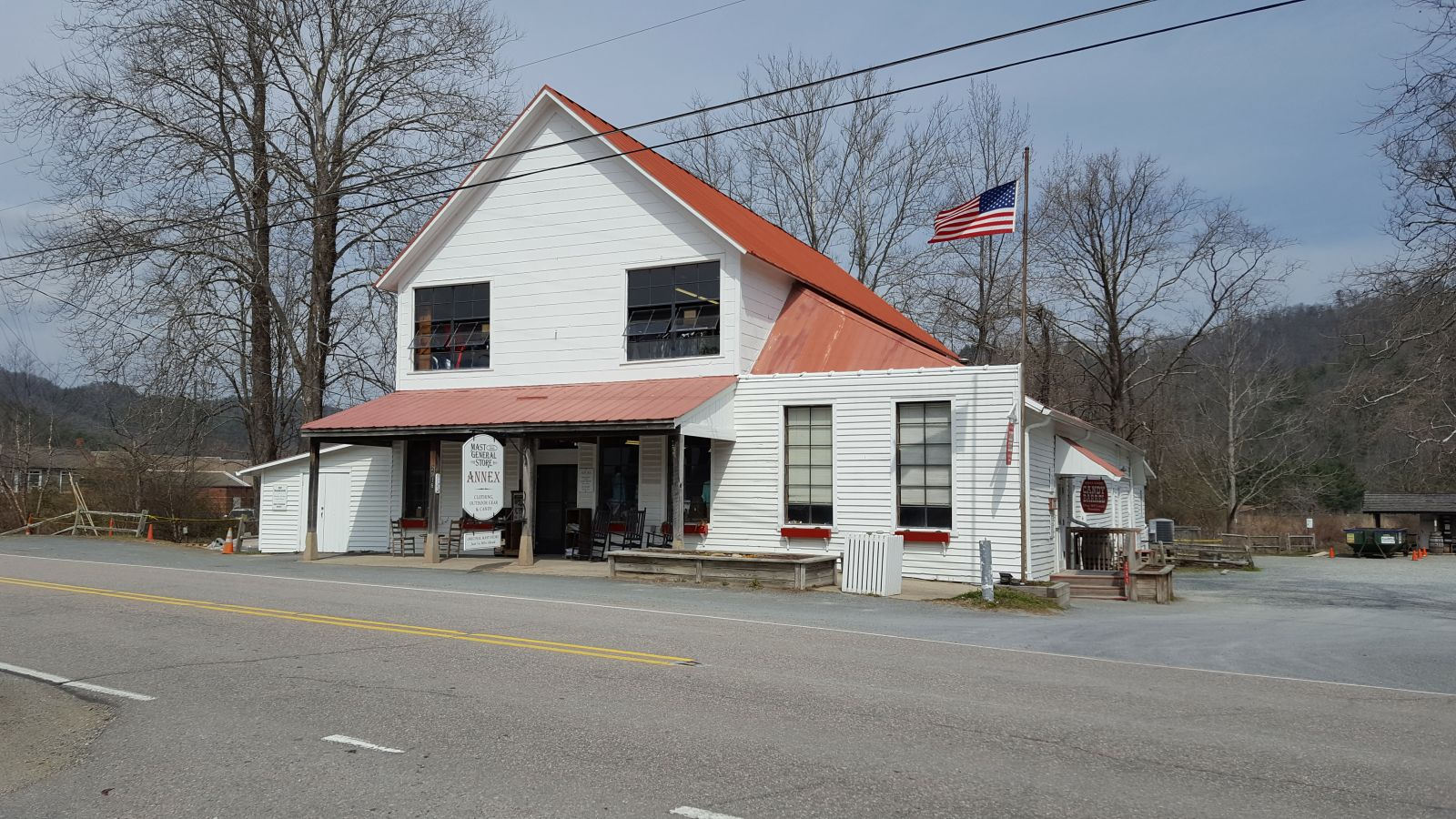
Farthing Store, 2017

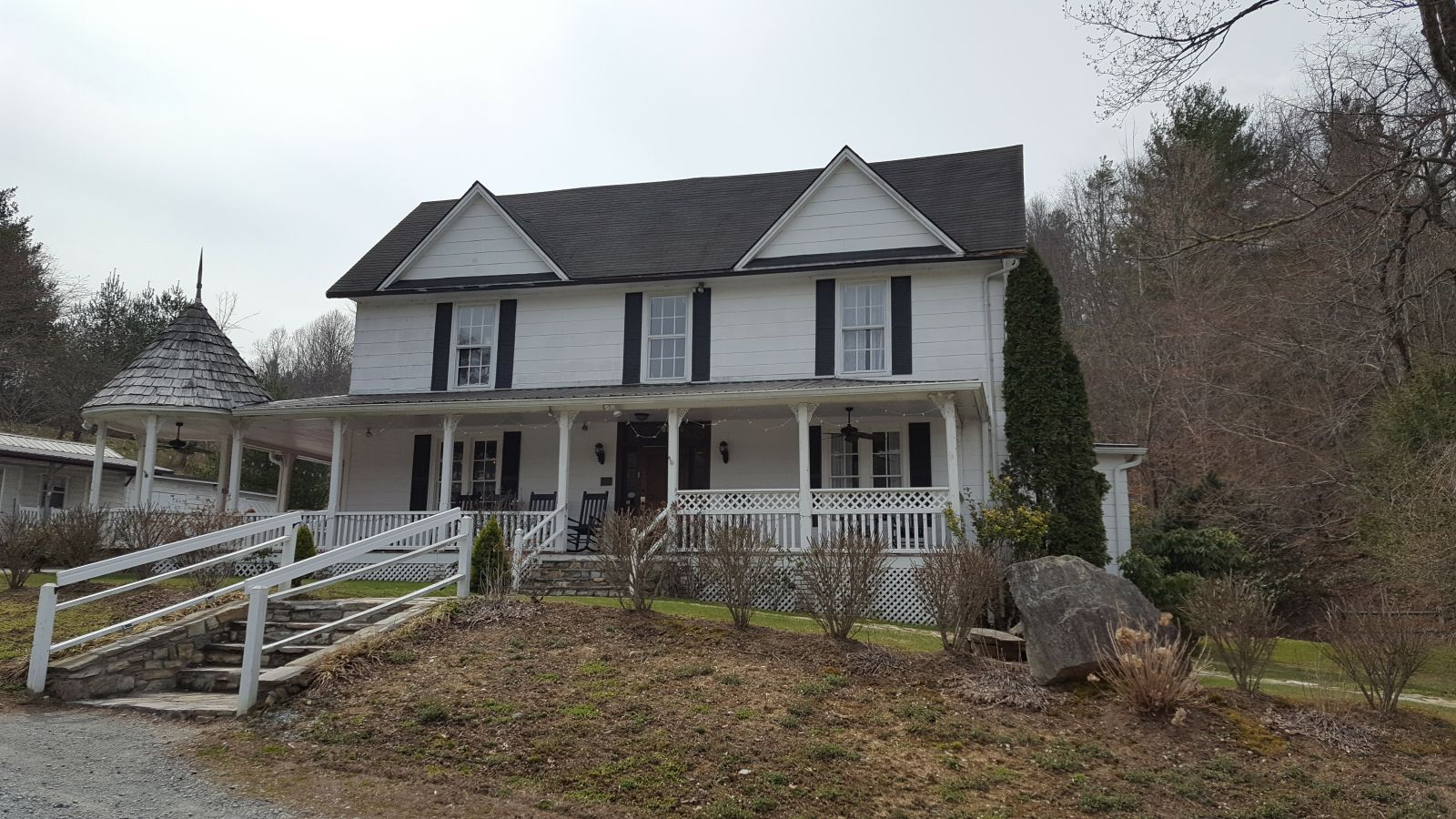
Hard Taylor House, 2017

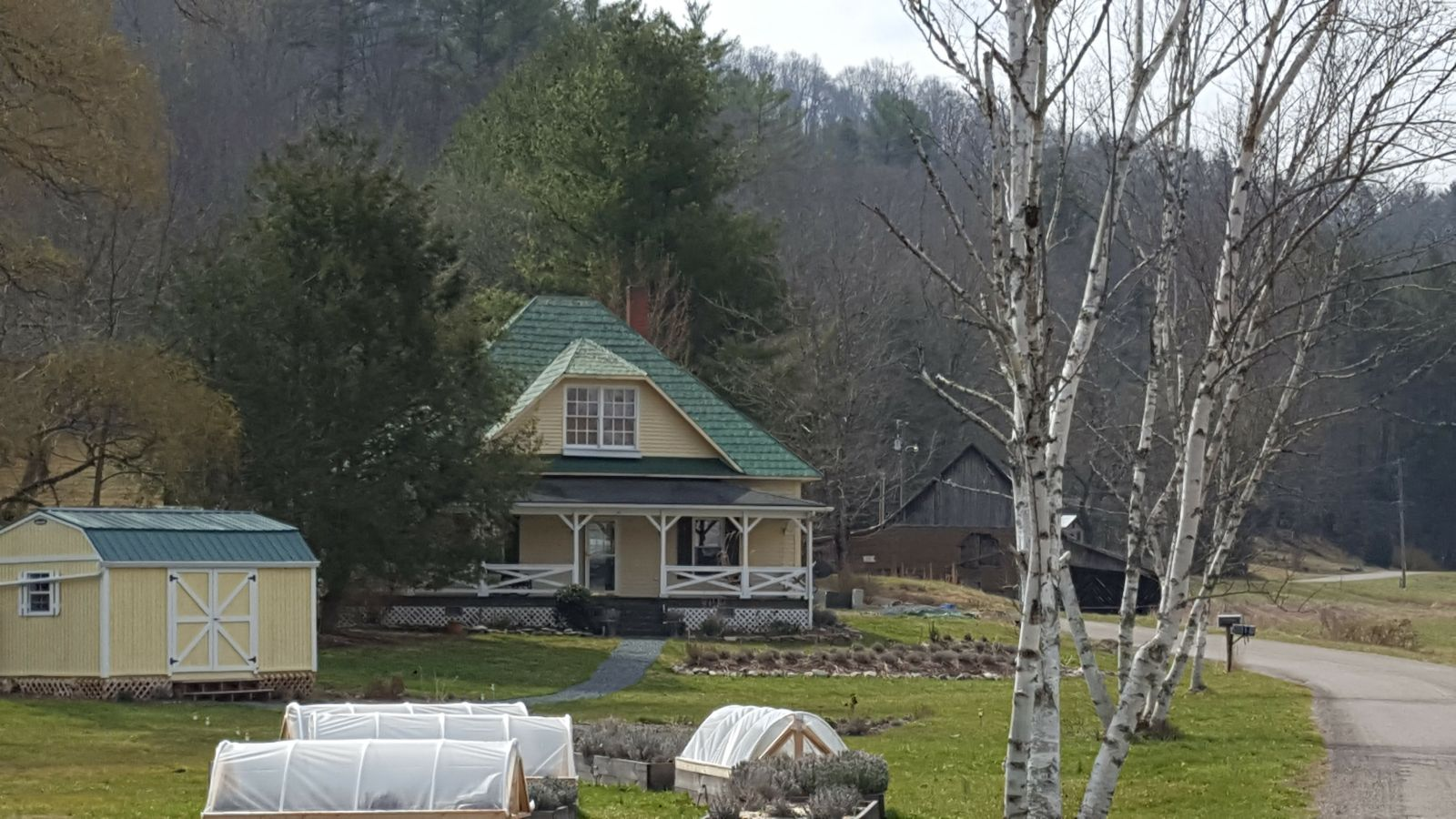
W.H. & Mollie Mast House (Willow House), 2017

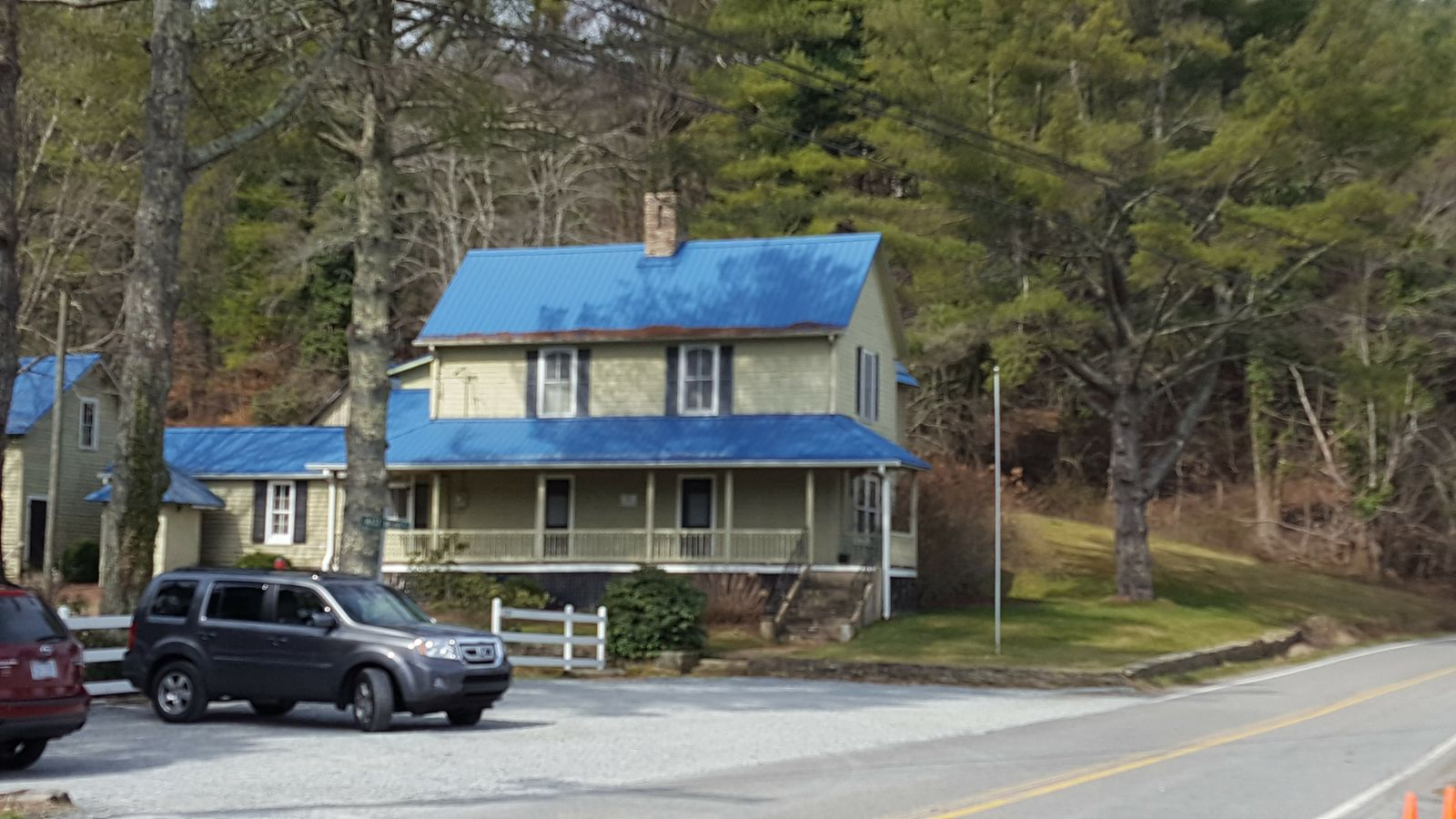
W.W. Mast House, 2017
