= William West Skiles =

American churchman and community founder

William West Skiles (1807–1862) was an American missionary, a Deacon in the Episcopal Church, and a teacher and community leader. He helped to found the community of Valle Crucis, North Carolina and to establish the church and missionary center there.

== Early life ==
William West Skiles (October 12, 1807 - December 8, 1862) was the founder of the community of Valle Crucis, North Carolina in the 1840s, and builder of the region's first Episcopal church. "William West Skiles, Episcopal missionary and teacher, was born in Hertford, Perquimans County, North Carolina. Following a few years of formal schooling in the local schools, he worked as a mechanic and later as overseer of a group of lumber mills in the vicinity of Plymouth, North Carolina. In 1844 Skiles left eastern North Carolina to settle in the newly formed community of Valle Crucis, Watauga County, North Carolina where Levi Silliman Ives, bishop of the Diocese of North Carolina, was in the process of developing a center for missionary work, a classical and agricultural school for boys, and a theological school. During the next year a chapel, schoolhouse, and dormitory were built as well as a sawmill and a blacksmith shop. A farm and a dairy were maintained to help support the community."

== Order of the Holy Cross ==
In December 1842, Bishop Levi Silliman Ives sent a priest to begin the Episcopal ministry in Valle Crucis Episcopal Mission. During the next 10 years, land was purchased, simple buildings were constructed to start the Mission School, and the Society of the Holy Cross, the first monastic order since the English Reformation in the 1500s, was formed. Ives sent William West Skiles to Valle Crucis to supervise the farming operation. Skiles was ordained a Deacon in 1847 and was instrumental in building St. John’s Episcopal Church in 1862.

"William West Skiles, a native of North Carolina, was the first man in the Anglican Communion since the Reformation to persevere in the dedicated life of poverty, chastity, and obedience under vows."

== Homely Sage of Valle Crucis ==
Brother Skiles often was consulted affectionately as the "homely sage" in the community, where few people could read or write. Local families would bring their letters to him to read for them, and to help write their answers. "A minister of the Gospel, a schoolmaster, a sort of physician, he was also public Scrivener and legal adviser. Few days passed when some letter was not brought to him to read and to answer; family letters of all kinds, business letters, legal papers, with these his pen was often busy... he was also a general counselor to the neighboring population." In addition, he was respected as an arbiter, settling arguments between farmers, as well as between family members. In short, his home was a little court in a section of the country where there were few lawyers and little law enforcement.

== Death and burial ==
When he died in 1862, he was buried at St John's Episcopal Church cemetery in Valle Crucis, North Carolina. His tombstone reds "Deacon. Monk. Missionary." Shortly after his death, the church was moved to a new location to avoid periodic flooding. William Skiles' remains were moved as well.

== Bibliography ==
- Cooper, Susan Fenimore. Missionary Life at Valle Crucis. Valle Crucis, N.C.: Valle Crucis Conference Center, 1992.
- Skiles, William West, and Susan Fenimore Cooper. A Sketch of Missionary Life at Valle Crucis in Western North Carolina 1842-1862. New York: James Pott & Co, 1992.
- "William West Skiles, Deacon, Monastic and Missionary, 1862". For All the Saints. 2012.
- "William West Skiles" Dictionary of North Carolina Biography. 1979 - 1996.
