= Mast General Store =

- U.S. National Register of Historic Places
- U.S. Historic district – Contributing property
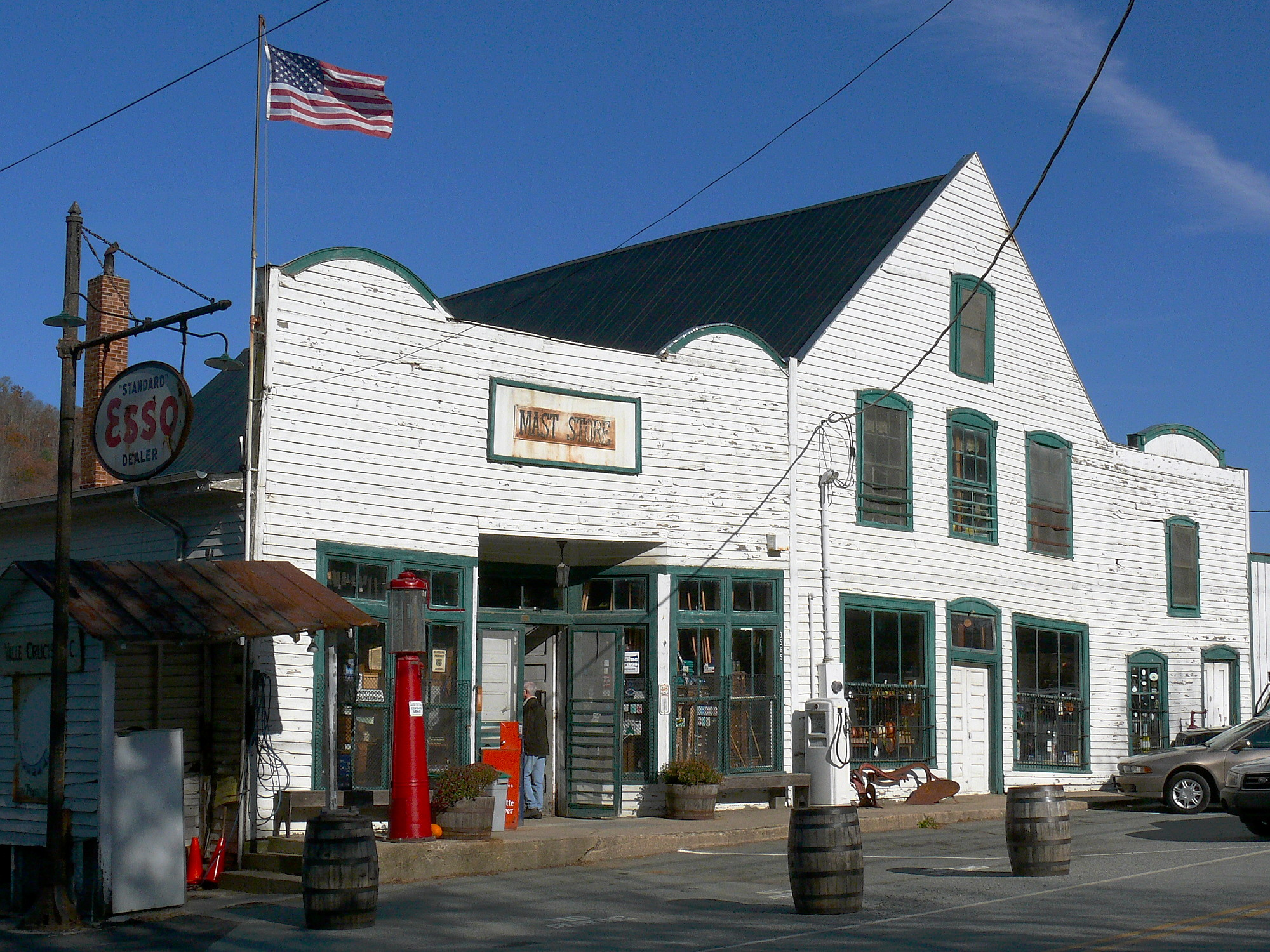

- Location within North Carolina Location within the United States
- Nearest city: Valle Crucis, North Carolina
- Coordinates: 36°12′28″N 81°46′48″W
- Area: less than one acre
- Built: 1883
- Website: www.mastgeneralstore.com
- NRHP reference No.: 73001383
- Added to NRHP: April 3, 1973

The Mast General Store is a general store located in Historic Valle Crucis, North Carolina. It is recognized by the National Register of Historic Places as one of the best remaining examples of the type. It is still the center of the community housing the post office (Valle Crucis, NC 28691) and offering coffee for 5¢ on the honor system. As of 2020 the business had expanded to eleven locations, including the original Store and annex, both located in Valle Crucis, North Carolina. The store sells commodities such as old-time hearth and home goods, outdoor clothing and gear, footwear, work clothes, old-fashioned wind-up toys, regional books and music, honey, and hundreds of varieties of old-fashioned candy.

== History ==
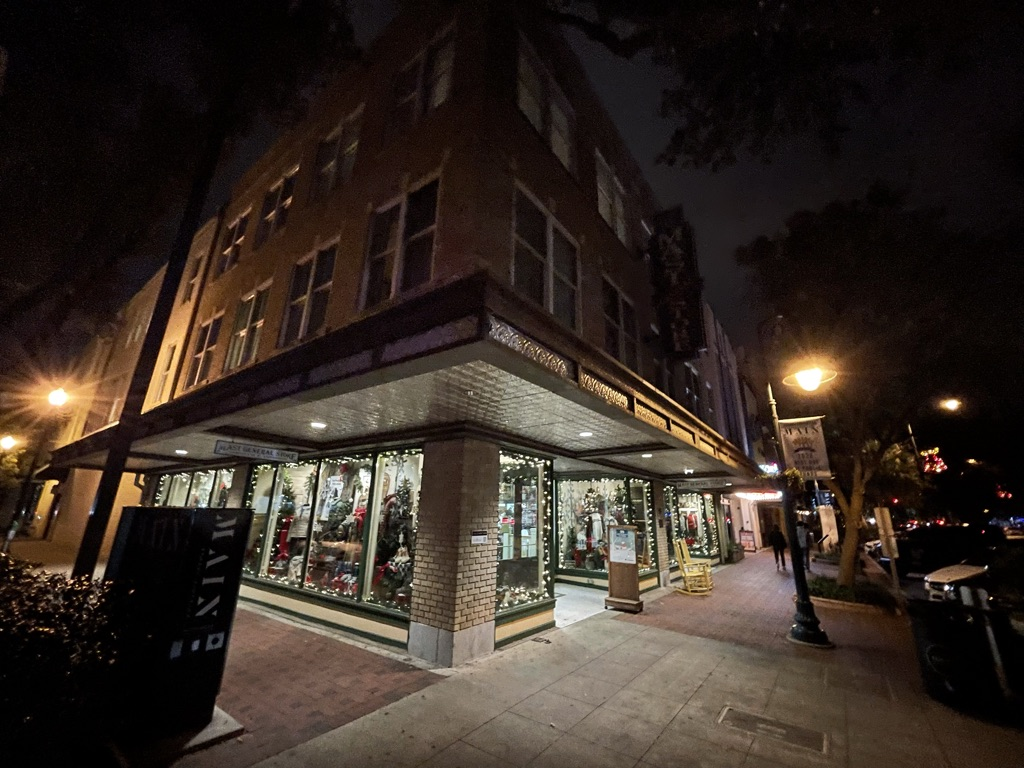
Mast General Store Columbia, South Carolina

The building that would become Mast General Store was constructed in 1882 by Henry Taylor and opened in 1883. W.W. Mast purchased half interest in the store in 1897, and the store was renamed the "Taylor and Mast General Store". In 1913, Mast purchased the remaining half of Taylor's interest, and the business became known as the Mast General Store. The business stayed in the family through three generations until 1973, when it was sold to a doctor from Atlanta and a professor from Appalachian State University. The store's slogan was "if you can't buy it here, you don't need it", a reference to the immense variety of items for sale.

The business closed its doors in 1977, but reopened in 1980 when it was purchased by John and Faye Cooper. In 1996, it became an employee-owned company.

The first store outside of the Valle Crucis area was opened in 1988 in Boone. It was followed by three more stores, for a total of six Mast General Stores in North Carolina. A Waynesville location opened in 1991, Hendersonville in August 1995, Asheville in 1999. A smaller concept store, Mast Store Candy and More, opened in Blowing Rock in March 2005 and has since closed. March 12, 2003, would see the first opening of a store outside of North Carolina, with a store opened in Greenville, South Carolina, inside a building that previously housed a Meyers-Arnold, a regional department store. A store on Gay Street in Downtown Knoxville, Tennessee opened in August 2006. The ninth Mast General Store was opened on May 25, 2011, in Columbia, South Carolina. The tenth store opened in Winston-Salem, North Carolina, in May 2015. The eleventh and newest store location opened in Roanoke, Virginia, in 2020.

== Historical recognition ==
The Mast General Store in Valle Crucis in times past

The Valle Crucis Mast General Store was added to the National Register of Historic Places on April 3, 1973. North Carolina has recognized the valley in which it is located as the first Rural Historic District. It also won the L. Vincent Lowe, Jr. Business Award from Preservation North Carolina in 1998. This award is given to businesses that make special efforts to assist and/or promote historic preservation in North Carolina It is located in the Valle Crucis Historic District.

== Green power ==
The Mast General Store committed to purchasing 3.6 million kilowatt-hours per year of "Green Energy" in 2006. Traditional fossil fuel would create 750,000 pounds of carbon dioxide to generate the same amount of electricity. This commitment was part of a campaign by NCGreenPower to expand the use of renewable energy in North Carolina.
