= Valle Crucis Episcopal Mission =

Historic district in North Carolina, United States

- U.S. National Register of Historic Places
- U.S. Historic district
- U.S. Historic district – Contributing property
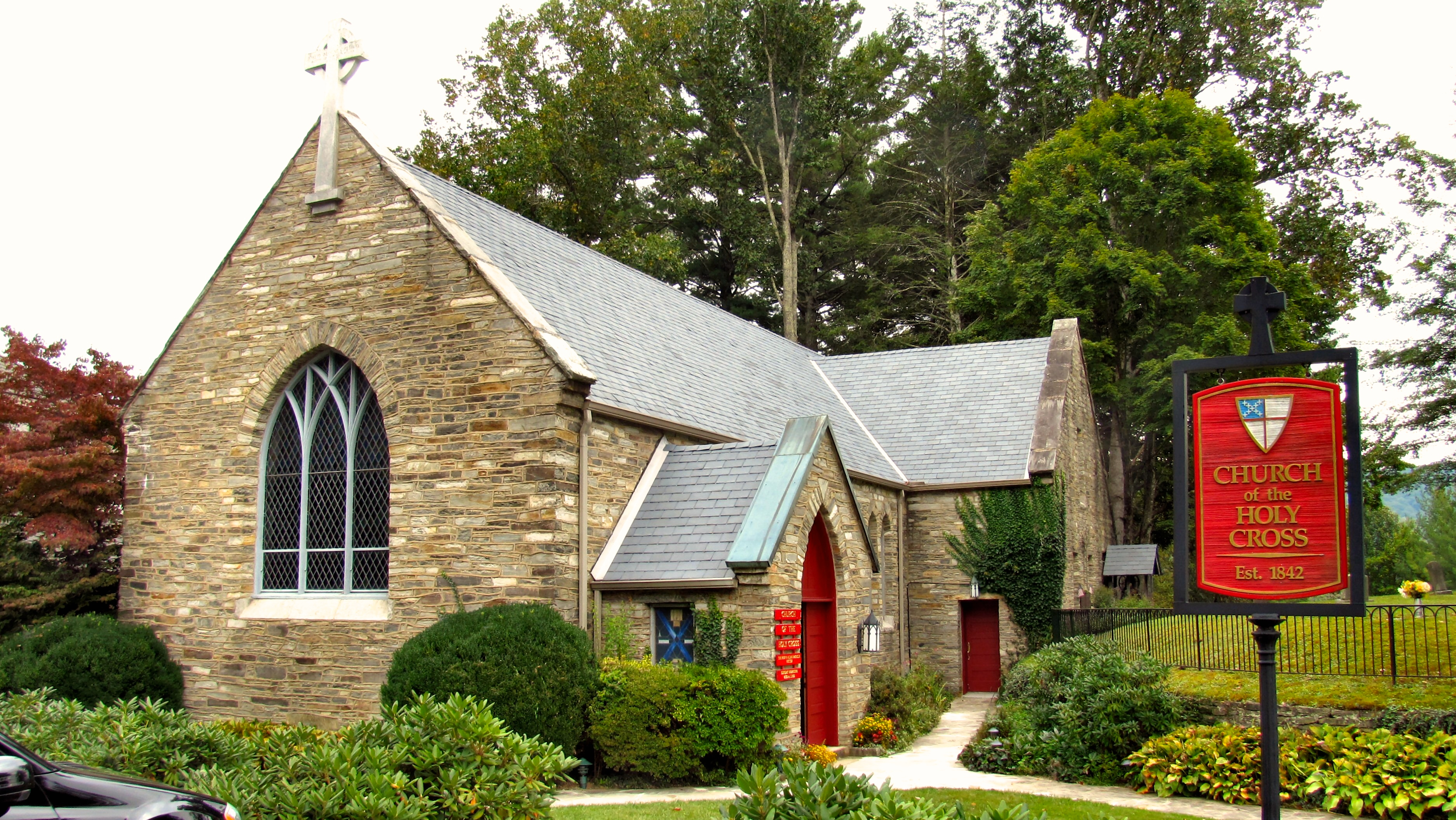
- Church of the Holy Cross

- Location within North Carolina Location within the United States
- Location: NC 194 N side, 1 miles SW of jct. with NC 1112, near Valle Crucis, North Carolina
- Coordinates: 36°11′45″N 81°47′46″W
- Area: 426 acres (172 ha)
- Built: 1896
- Architectural style: Late Gothic Revival, Bungalow/Craftsman
- NRHP reference No.: 93000938
- Added to NRHP: September 09, 1993

Valle Crucis Episcopal Mission, also known as Valle Crucis Conference Center, is a historic Episcopal mission church complex and national historic district located near Valle Crucis, Watauga County, North Carolina. The Gothic Revival style, gable-front stone Church of the Holy Cross was built about 1924. Other contributing resources are the church cemetery with the earliest burial dated to 1808, Auchmutv Hall dormitory (1910-1911), The Annex (c. 1920), "The Farm House" (1915), Former Dairy Barn (now "The Apple Barn", 1903-1911), Former Apple Barn (now "The Bunk House", 1914), The Mission House (1896), the Power Dam (1903-1930), the Valley / Field, and the Apple Orchard. The Valle Crucis Episcopal Mission was established by the Episcopal Church in 1844-1845.

It was listed on the National Register of Historic Places in 1993. It is located in the Valle Crucis Historic District.

== Order of the Holy Cross ==
Bishop Levi Silliman Ives of the Episcopal Diocese of North Carolina founded a religious community called the Brotherhood of the Holy Cross, at Valle Crucis in 1842. He had become more attracted to Roman Catholic teachings through the Oxford Movement in the Anglican Church. He wanted to form a monastery for Episcopalian men following the rule of St. Benedict in the Roman church. "So warm was the advocacy of the Oxford theories by Bishop Ives that he was arraigned for them before the convention of the Episcopal Church. His explanations were accepted for a time, but the "Brotherhood of the Holy Cross" was dissolved."

"There had been a slight abortive attempt at forming an American Order, under Bishop Ives, at Valle Crucis, North Carolina. But it had come to nothing."

The Rev. William Glenny French was the first Superior of the Order of the Holy Cross. Father William established a rigorous schedule for everyone in the order. Religious services were held three times a day, and each man and boy were required to do two hours of manual labor a day. He also worked as a missionary to the local mountain communities, holding services and sacraments to both the free and the slave populations. However, the practices of private confession and absolution were considered highly objectionable to the Episcopal practices of the day, and the society was abolished in 1849.

William West Skiles, a brother and deacon, helped start the religious community at Valle Crucis.

== Church of the Holy Cross ==
The cornerstone of the Church of the Holy Cross was laid in 1924. The parquet floor was part of the original building, and was made from the end pieces of 2x4's and three inches deep. Each piece was dovetailed to interlock and to fit into a subfloor. There is nothing similar to this anywhere else in the Valley. The "Skiles Altar" is a Dutch cupboard that is hand carved with suitable inscriptions in honor of William West Skiles, a missionary brother of the Order of the Holy Cross. The altar was given in his memory by the Order of the Holy Cross in the 1950s or 1960s.

== Chapel of St. Anthony ==
The Chapel of St Anthony is between the four hermitages at the Valle Crucis. These Hermitage (religious retreat) are small cabins designed for individuals desiring temporary renewal and reflection, and are open to artists, writers, educators and people of many faith backgrounds. The hermitages and the chapel create a small, isolated community separate from the rest of the mission, and the chapel has a hickory floor, a hand hewn altar, and local and custom artwork adorn the walls. The chapel is designed to facilitate quiet prayer, contemplation and spiritual direction.

== School ==
As part of the Episcopal mission, a classical and theological school was established for the local children, including not only academic subjects but agricultural ones as well. The school was named the Classical and Agricultural School, and was the first one in the state to teach practical agriculture. One section of the school prepared boys for the ministry, and included at least one black man, William Alston, as a student, who finished in 1850, and went on to become an ordained minister in Philadelphia and New York.

The school closed in 1850 as the mission was abandoned. But in 1895, under Bishop Joseph Blount Cheshire and the Rev. Milor Jones, the school was reopened with an eight-room, two story Mission House, which housed a teacher, another mission worker, and several boarding school students. The school continued to the 1990s, and boarded girls who learned home skills of milking, making butter, cooking, weaving, laundry work, sewing and embroidery. Boys attended day classes, and the student population increased by 1900 to one hundred, about half boys and half girls. Later on, Bishop Junius Horner insisted that the school operate a farm to support the mission. He acquired 525 acres of more land for the mission and he said that the school was "intended for the class of boys and girls who cannot take advantage of more expensive schools." By 1906 over a thousand fowls were raised in the chicken coops, and over a hundred acres were devoted to apple trees.

== Valle Crucis, Shawneehaw and Elk Park Turnpike ==
The Valle Crucis, Shaneehaw and Elk Park Turnpike was built as a private toll road between 1891 and 1892, using only hand labor and without machinery. A particular four mile section is noted for its winding curves from the Valle Crucis Elementary School to Banner Elk, North Carolina, and for its scenery. Today, the older roadbed is part of North Carolina Highway 194.

== Bibliography ==
- Bumgardner, Jim. All the Vales Rejoice. [Blowing Rock, N.C.]: [St. Mary's of the Hills], 1991. Notes: Notes: A capella music used in Anglican worship services. Performer(s): Performed by the choir of St. Mary's of the Hills; choir director, Jim Bumgardner. Event notes: Recorded live at St. John's Episcopal Church, Valle Crucis, N.C., November 1991. Description: 1 audiocassette: analog, Dolby processed. Contents: Victimae pachali laudes—O Lord, the maker of all thing—Lord, for thy tender mercies sake—O Lord, give thy holy spirit—If ye love me—Purge me, oh Lord—Call to remembrance—da Palestrina—O bone Jesu—da Palestrina: Sicut Cervus—Ave verum corpus—Kyrie and Agnus dei—Cantate domino—Almighty and everlasting God—Thou knowest, Lord—Miserere mei—Ubi caritas—A grace—The lamb.
- Clyde, Sharon. Watauga County, North Carolina: Including Its History, the Valle Crucis Episcopal Mission. [Place of publication not identified]: Earth Eyes Travel Guides, 2012.
- Cobb, David Cleopas. Transforming Communities: The Formation of Monastic Communities in the 19th Century and Episcopal Service Corps Houses in the 21st Century. Thesis (D. Min.)--University of the South, 2017, 2017.
- French, William Glenney, and H. Glenney French. History of the Order of the Holy Cross at Valle Crucis, North Carolina Under Right Rev. Levi Silliman Ives, 1847-1851. 1911. Notes: History, 1847-1850, of the Episcopal Order of the Holy Cross's combined monastery, divinity school, training school for boys, and mountain mission at Valle Crucis, Watauga County, N.C., written by its first Superior. Included are copies of letters and diary entries, 1833-1858, added by French's son, H. Glenney (Horatio Glenney) French, ca. 1911.
- Gooding family. William L. Horner Collection: Gooding Family Papers. 1799. Notes: Collection consists primarily of correspondence and financial records. The bulk of the correspondence concerns the Confederacy and troop maneuvers in the Shenandoah Valley area of western Virginia, eastern North Carolina, and Georgia. Letters describe the disillusionment of soldiers, camp life, the occupation and administration of New Bern by Union forces, scarcity of goods, duty at Fort Holmes, soldier desertion, General William T. Sherman's "March to the Sea," Union Army's attack on Atlanta and Savannah, and the Confederacy during Sherman's Carolina Campaign of 1865. Other correspondence concerns the Gooding family and their business affairs, including letters from Edward Stanley; the spread of illnesses such as influenza, whopping cough, and typhoid fever; and the Episcopal Seminary of Valle Crucis in western North Carolina. Contains Civil War records, including a list of African American men on board the U.S. steamer COSSACK, a list of soldiers issued supplies, and a copy of "The Proclamation made by the Union Government at New Bern." Legal records concern runaway slaves, R.J. Gooding's will, and the Gooding pharmaceutical business. Land records describe the purchase and sale of land by the Gooding family. Financial records include promissory notes, account ledgers, sale inventories, a list of taxable property, and purchase receipts.
- Horner, Junius M. Southern Appalachian Highlanders. Time Period of Item: 1927. Penland School of Crafts, n.d. Summary: This illustrated pamphlet was designed to encourage donations to support the work of Episcopal missions in Western North Carolina. Published by the Episcopal Diocese of Western North Carolina in 1927, the pamphlet gives brief descriptions of the mission work being done in the Appalachian School (Penland, N.C.), Valle Crucis School (Valle Crucis, N.C.), Christ School (Arden, N.C.), and Patterson School (Patterson or Lenoir, N.C.) during the 1920s. The pamphlet was written by the Right Reverend Junius Moore Horner (1859-1933), bishop of the Diocese of Western North Carolina. From 1923 to 1938 the Appalachian School served as the umbrella institution under which the Penland Weavers and Potters were organized and the Penland School of Handicrafts (now Penland School of Crafts) was established.
- Hughes, I. Harding. Valle Crucis: A History of an Uncommon Place. [Valle Crucis, NC]: I.H. Hughes, 1995.
- Hughson, Walter. The Church's Mission to the Mountaineers of the South. Hartford, Conn: Church Missions Pub. Co, 1908.
- McCracken, Elizabeth. Western North Carolina Trains Youth. 1938. Notes: "A series of articles on the church schools in the Diocese of Western Carolina, which appeared in The spirit of missions for June–September, 1938." Description: 16 pages: illustrations, portraits; 24 cm. Contents: The Appalachian School at Penland, staffed by devoted missionaries, prepares its pupils for Christian living—Girls school at Valle Crucis steadfast to ideal of mission begun nearly a century ago in the Vale of the Cross—The Patterson School at Legerwood teaches boys lessons of eternal verity including value of the land. Responsibility: by Elizabeth McCracken, literary editor of The living church and editorial correspondent of The spirit of missions.
- Oxford, Scott Alexander. Maturing in the Spirit: Spiritual Development at Church of the Holy Cross, Valle Crucis. 1994.
- Richardson, Katherine H. National Register of Historic Places Registration Form: Valle Crucis Episcopal Mission (Valle Crucis Conference Center). 1993.
- Skiles, William West, and Susan Fenimore Cooper. A Sketch of Missionary Life at Valle Crucis in Western North Carolina 1842-1862. New York: James Pott & Co, 1992.
- Valle Crucis Mission School (N.C.). Valle Crucis Mission School Collection. 1895. Notes: Collection #127. Collection was arranged by a student intern and staff archivist.
- Valle Crucis Summer School for Religious Education. Valle Crucis Summer School for Religious Education, July 5th-17th. [Valle Crucis, N.C.]: [Summer School for Religious Education], 1926. Notes: Announcement for the 1926 summer school session, including list of executive committee and instructors, rates, dates, and mission statement.
- Wright, Lewis. 1997. "The Church of the Holy Cross Valle Crucis, North Carolina". Anglican and Episcopal History. 66, no. 4: 564-569.
