= Mast Farm =

Historic farm in North Carolina, United States

- U.S. National Register of Historic Places
- U.S. Historic district – Contributing property
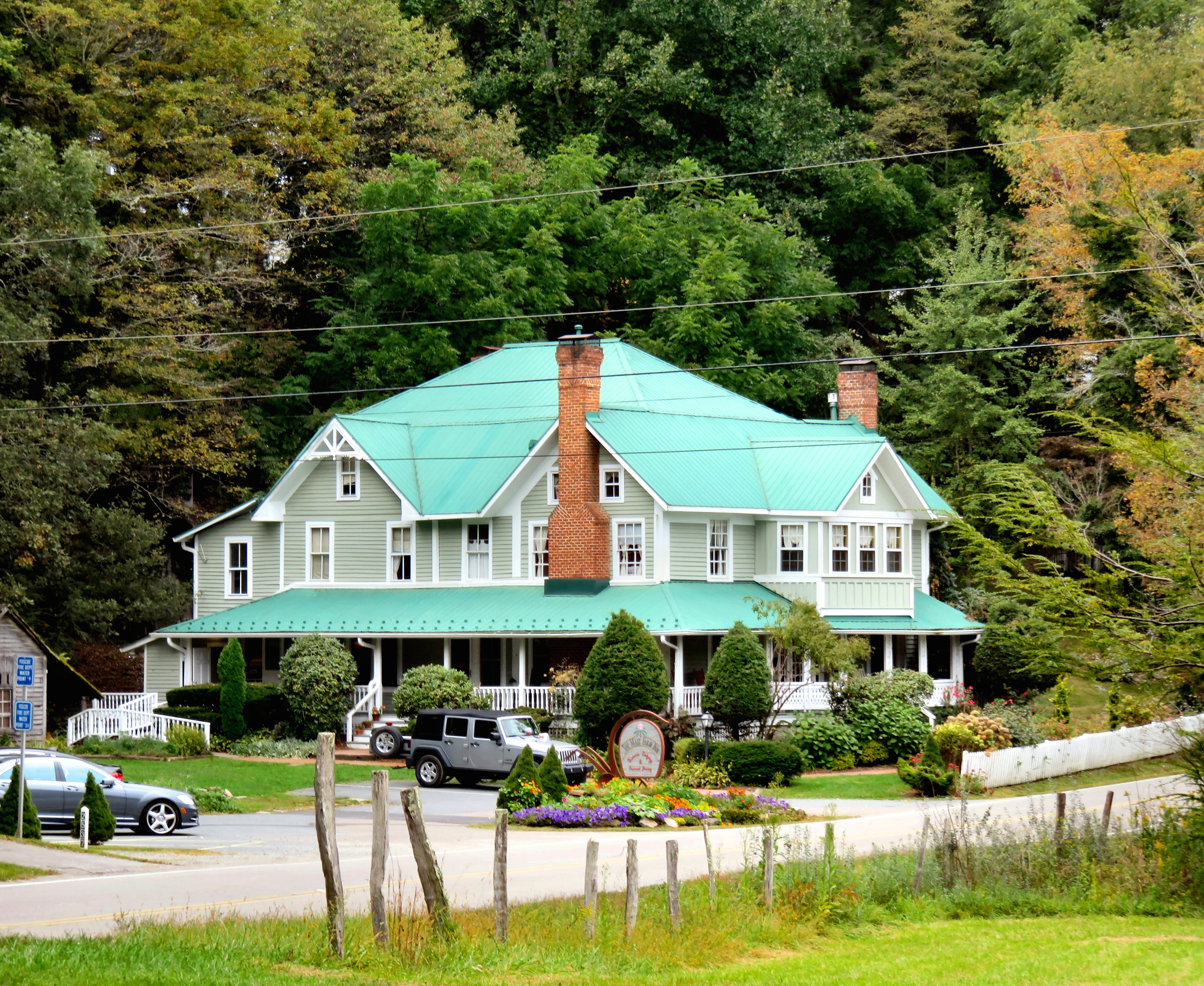
- Mast Farm Inn

- Location within North Carolina Location within the United States
- Location: E of Valle Crucis off SR 1112, near Valle Crucis, North Carolina
- Coordinates: 36°12′23″N 81°46′15″W
- Area: 8 acres (3.2 ha)
- Built: c.1812, 1885
- Part of: Valle Crucis Historic District
- NRHP reference No.: 72001002
- Added to NRHP: January 20, 1972

The Mast Farm is a historic farm located near Valle Crucis, Watauga County, North Carolina and is now the Mast Farm Inn. In the late 1700s, Joseph Mast walked from Pennsylvania and settled on much of the land that is now Valle Crucis. Around 1810, his son David built the two-room log cabin which now sits facing the main house at the Mast Farm. David's son Andrew began building the main house around 1880. Andrew's son, D. Finley Mast, completed it in 1896. A photo of the house in the early 1900s shows a sign stating simply, "BROOKSHIDE FARM, D. FINLEY MAST, ONE HALF MILE TO POST OFFICE." Originally, the main house consisted of only the part closest to the road – three stories high, with two rooms on each floor. Like most large homes with open flames for cooking, it had a detached kitchen. The main house is a two-story frame dwelling with a gable roof. In the early 1900s, Finley and his wife, Josephine, began to make additions to the house and to operate it as an inn. Over a period of about twenty-five years, five different symmetrical additions were completed, ultimately comprising thirteen bedrooms – and one bathroom. Other contributing buildings are an eight-sided gazebo (1890), wash house, spring house, meat house, log woodhouse, apple house (1905), weaving house (c. 1812), blacksmith shop, and gambrel roofed barn. The weaving house served as the original farm house.

The Mast Farm was listed on the National Register of Historic Places in 1972. It is also located in the National Register-listed Valle Crucis Historic District.
