= Valle Crucis, North Carolina =

Valle Crucis
- Unincorporated community
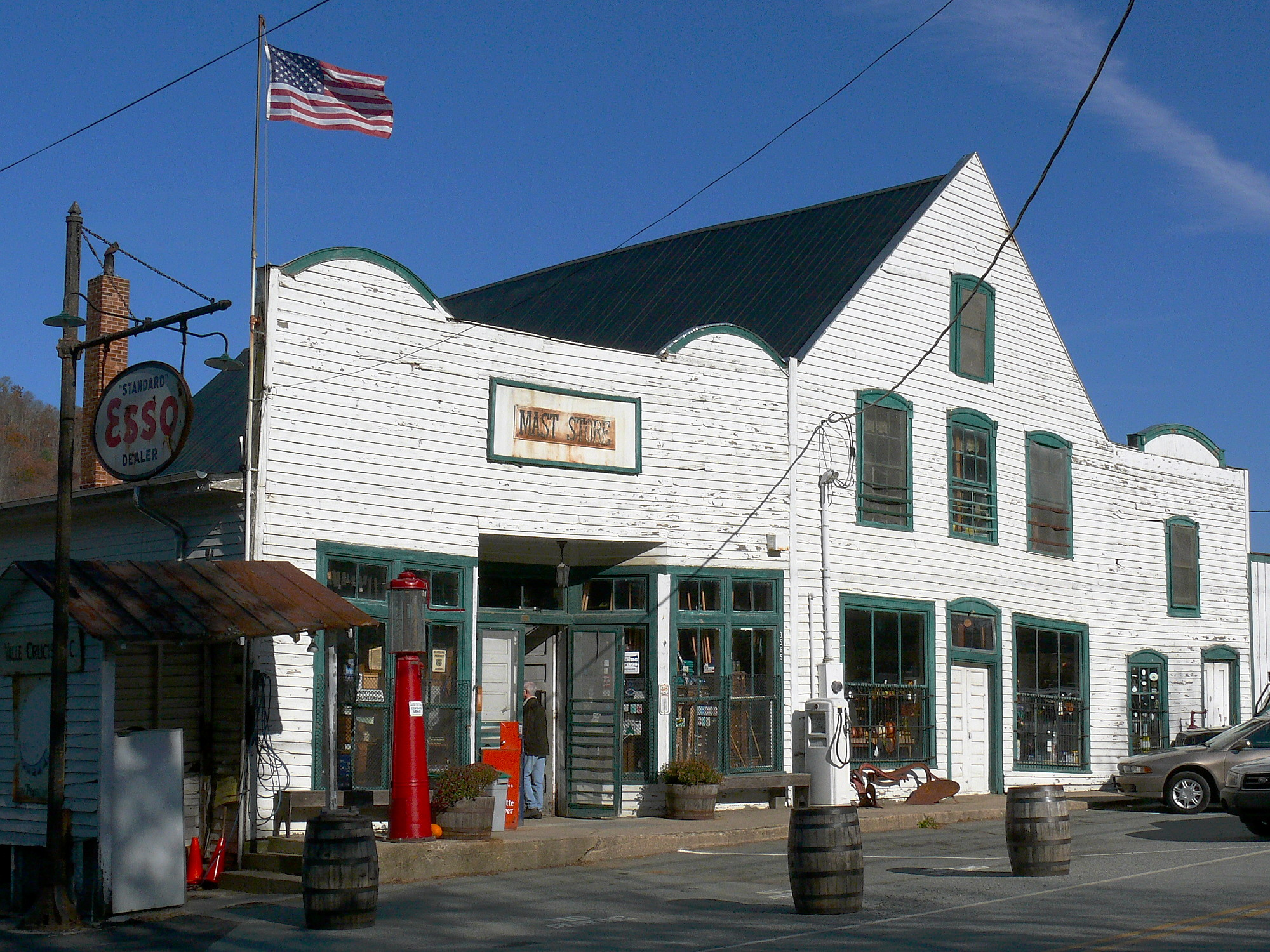
- Mast General Store

- Location within the state of North Carolina
- Coordinates: 36°12′27″N 81°47′10″W
- Country: United States
- State: North Carolina
- County: Watauga County
- Founded: 1842

Area
  - Total: 4.46 sq mi (11.55 km^{2})
  - Land: 4.44 sq mi (11.49 km^{2})
  - Water: 0.023 sq mi (0.06 km^{2})
- Elevation: 2,858 ft (871 m)

Population (2020)
  - Total: 436
  - Density: 98.3/sq mi (37.95/km^{2})
- Time zone: UTC-5 (Eastern (EST))
  - Summer (DST): UTC-4 (EDT)
- ZIP code: 28691
- Area code: 828
- GNIS feature ID: 2584333
- Website: www.vallecrucis.com

Valle Crucis is an unincorporated community and census-designated place located in Watauga County, North Carolina, United States. As of the 2020 census, Valle Crucis had a population of 436. The name of the town is Latin for "Vale of the Cross," a reference to a valley in the area where three streams converge to form a shape similar to an archbishop's cross. The community is located along NC 194, between the towns of Banner Elk and Boone.

== Demographics ==
Historical population
Census	Pop.	Note	%±
2020	436		—
U.S. Decennial Census

== History ==
Before the 1840s, there has been scattered settlements in the area but not permanently until the Valle Crucis Episcopal Mission was established. Founded by Levi Silliman Ives, an Episcopal missionary, "Easter Chapel" served as the first Episcopal church in the area. Its successor, the Holy Cross Episcopal Church, was built in 1926 and modeled on a now-defunct medieval monastery in Wales and is noteworthy for its architecture.

== Geography and climate ==
Valle Crucis is located at the banks of Dutch Creek and Watauga River, at an elevation of 2,677 feet (816 m) above sea level. To its north and east is Tester Mountain and to its south and west is Valle Mountain. The community is also within the Pisgah National Forest boundary, which limits some development in the area.

Weather ranges from warm summer days and cool summer evenings to cold or even bitterly cold winter nights. Rainfall is moderate, averaging 43 inches (1,100 mm) per year. Severe storms are rare. Snowfall occurs in the winter with some accumulation to be expected several times between December and April. Snowfall averages 42 inches (1,100 mm) per year. The area is also known for being one of the lowest and most quickly flooded in the region. The heart of Valle Crucis, including the bulk of the stores, the elementary school, and community park is a particularly low lying and flat in comparison to the mountainous terrain of the surrounding areas. Flooding is not an extremely rare event and can inhibit many functions of the town, such as the well known occasional flooding of the bridge on DeWitt Barnett Road, inhibiting access from that side of the town.

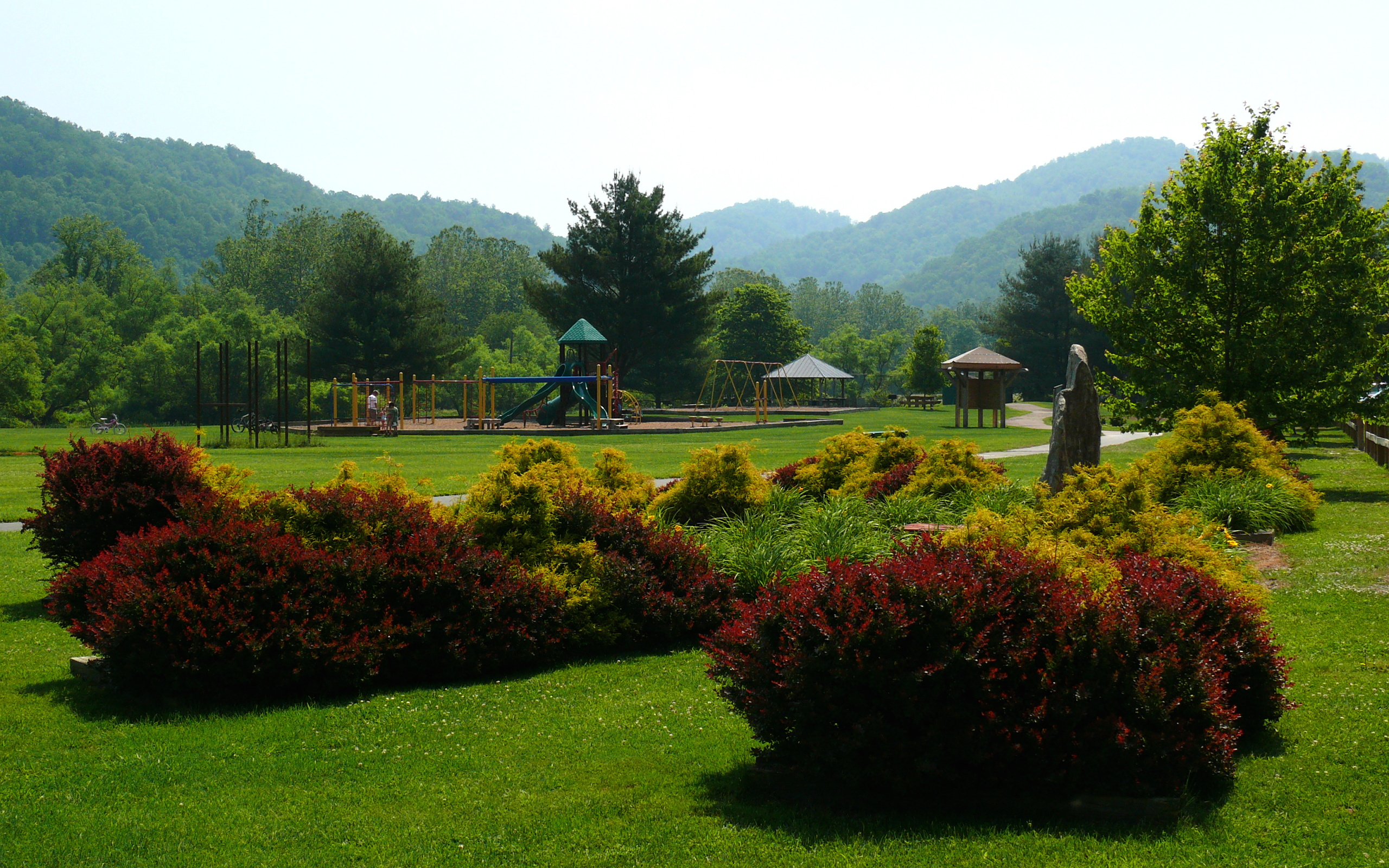
The Valle Crucis Community Park.

== Attractions ==
The most notable attraction in the area is the original Mast General Store. Also located in the community is the Mast Farm, Valle Crucis Episcopal Mission and Valle Crucis Historic District, all of which are listed on the National Register of Historic Places.

The Valle Crucis Community Park, established in 1983 by a nonprofit organization, is a large park with amenities including picnic shelters, children playgrounds, a 1-mile (1.6 km) paved path and access to the Watauga River for wading and fly-fishing.
