= Hibriten High School =

American public school in North Carolina

Location
- 1350 Panther Trail SE; Lenoir, North Carolina 28645; United States
- 35°55′32″N 81°29′41″W

Information
- School type: Public
- Founded: 1966 (60 years ago)
- School district: Caldwell County Schools
- CEEB code: 342239
- Principal: Ed Wills
- Teaching staff: 51.51 (FTE)
- Grades: 9–12
- Enrollment: 811 (2023-2024)
- Student to teacher ratio: 15.74
- Colors: Red, black, white
- Mascot: Black panther
- Team name: Panthers
- Feeder schools: William Lenoir Middle School, Happy Valley School, Kings Creek School
- Website: hhs.caldwellschools.com

Hibriten High School (HHS) is a comprehensive, four-year high school accredited by the NC Department of Public Instruction and the Southern Colleges and Schools. The school is located at the foot of Hibriten Mountain, the western end of the Brushy Mountains in Lenoir, North Carolina.

== History ==
=== Name ===
The name "Hibriten" stems from Brighton, England. A local resident who was impressed with the beauty of Brighton, England, thought the mountain on the east side of Lenoir should have a sophisticated name since it was the “high” point of Lenoir. Combining “High” and “Brighton,” the name was eventually shortened to one word, “Hibriten.”

=== Hibriten Academy ===
The Hibriten Academy was founded in 1885 on the Wildwood Road. It was a larger school than most of the ones for that period of time as it had three teachers and students of all ages. The rooms were heated with pot-bellied stoves, and the boy students had to cut the wood to keep the fires going. Water was carried to the rooms in a bucket and the students had their own cup to pour the water into from the bucket. Hibriten Academy was consolidated with Kings Creek High at the end of the 1932 school term.

=== Building and construction of Hibriten High School ===
Following a survey of the schools of Caldwell County in 1963, the State Department of Public Instruction recommended that three of the rural schools—Oak Hill, King's Creek, and Happy Valley—be consolidated. It was also recommended that a new building be constructed on a new site for the consolidated high school. Thirty-five acres of land, located in the Lower Creek section of the county, were purchased at a cost of $37,500.

In 1962, an architect was employed for a period of two years to complete plans for the building. Designed in a plan similar to a split-level building, the school consists of three levels and contains departments in science, home economics, English, French, math, social studies, music, physical education, drama, child care center, and vocational studies which include technical drafting, business, introduction to vocations, agriculture, carpentry, graphics, electronics, bricklaying, and the work study programs of industrial cooperative training and distributive education. The building also includes administrative offices for the principal, assistant principal, secretary, guidance suite, visual air room, two first-aid rooms, and a conference room. The cafeteria seats 250 people.

Located at the foot of Hibriten Mountain, the school was given the name of Hibriten High School. Its mascot is a panther, and the school colors are red, black, and white. It is located two miles from the main thoroughfare of the city of Lenoir. The school was officially opened in the fall of 1966 with Kenneth A. Roberts as principal and Ronald Beane as assistant principal. Student enrollment for the 1966-67 school term was 715, with a faculty of 42. The class of 1967 graduated 118 students. Five elementary schools send students to Hibriten High School.

The gymnasium and music building were completed in 1972 with the gym seating 1800 people.

== School bands ==
The Hibriten High School Symphonic Band is the main band of the school. It was established in 1966. As of Spring 2017, the bands (both symphonic and concert bands) have accumulated fifty-three superior ratings (21 consecutive by the symphonic band from 1994 to 2014), with most of them in Grade VI music (the most difficult level).

Of note are the band directors who taught at Hibriten and who are now in the North Carolina Bandmaster's Hall of Fame. These include George Kirsten (George Kirsten's sister Dorothy Kirsten sang operatic mezzo-soprano in the NY Metropolitan Opera), and Camilla Graeber. Other HHS Band directors have been honored by the Northwest District of the NC Bandmasters Association including Dennis Carswell, John Craig, and Bill Witcher.

== School songs ==
The fight song was written by Captain Ralph Ostrom. The alma mater was written by Kathryn Wilson and John Craig.

== Athletics ==
Hibriten is a member of the North Carolina High School Athletic Association (NCHSAA) and are classified as a 4A school. The school is a part of the Western Piedmont 3A/4A Conference. Hibriten's school colors are red, black, and white, and its team name is the Panthers. Sports at Hibriten include:

- Baseball
- Basketball
- Competition Cheerleading
- Cross Country
- Football
- Golf
- Marching Band
- Soccer
- Softball
- Swimming
- Tennis
- Indoor/Outdoor Track & Field
- Volleyball
- Wrestling

== Notable alumni ==
- Nick Easton, NFL offensive lineman
- Bobby McMillon, singer, musician, and storyteller
