= Belt Woods =

Nature reserve in Prince George's County, Maryland

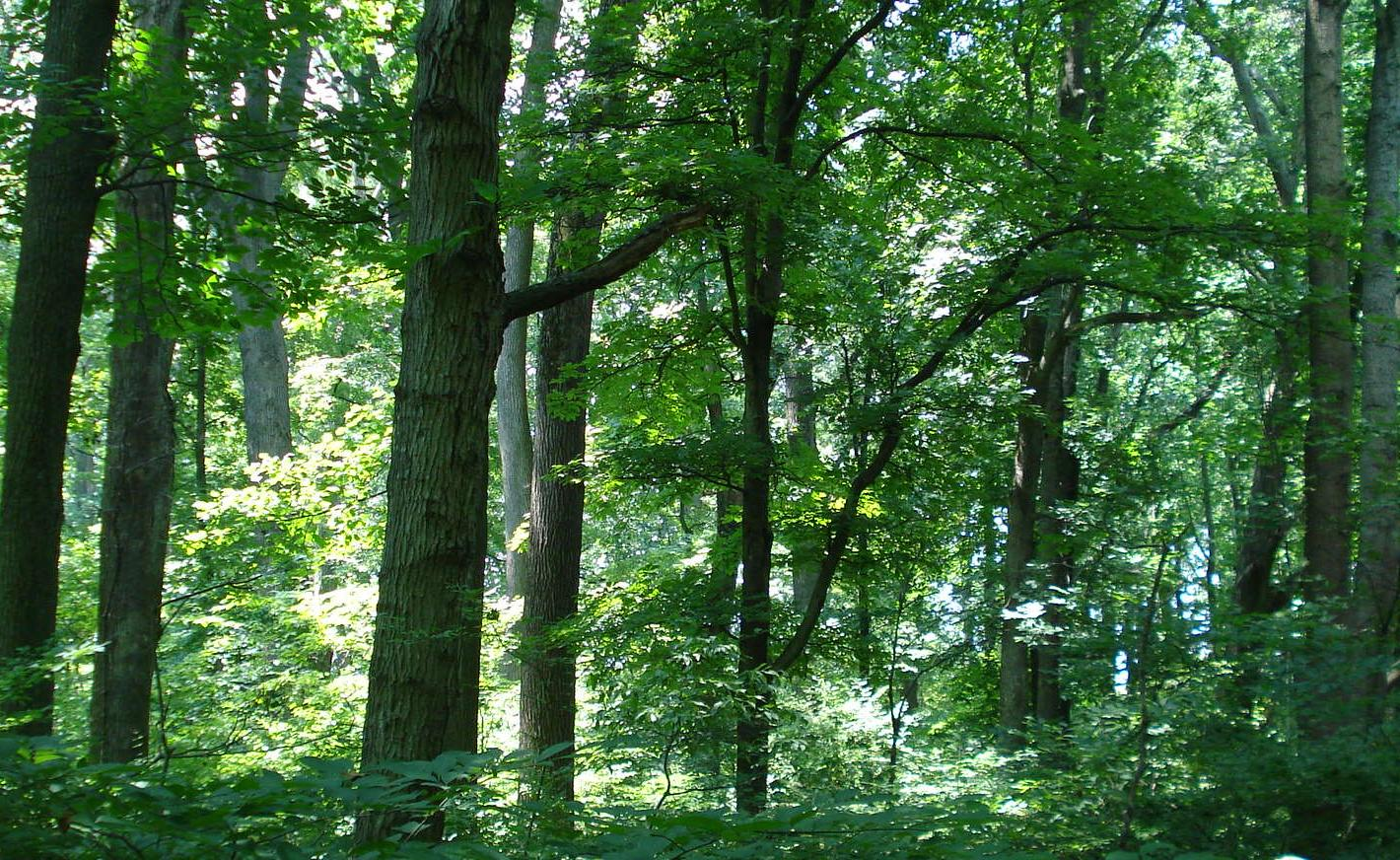

- Location within Maryland
- Area: 43 acres (17 ha)

Geography
- Country: United States
- State: Maryland
- District: Prince George's County
- Coordinates: 38.90505°N 76.76304°W
- Interactive map of Belt Woods

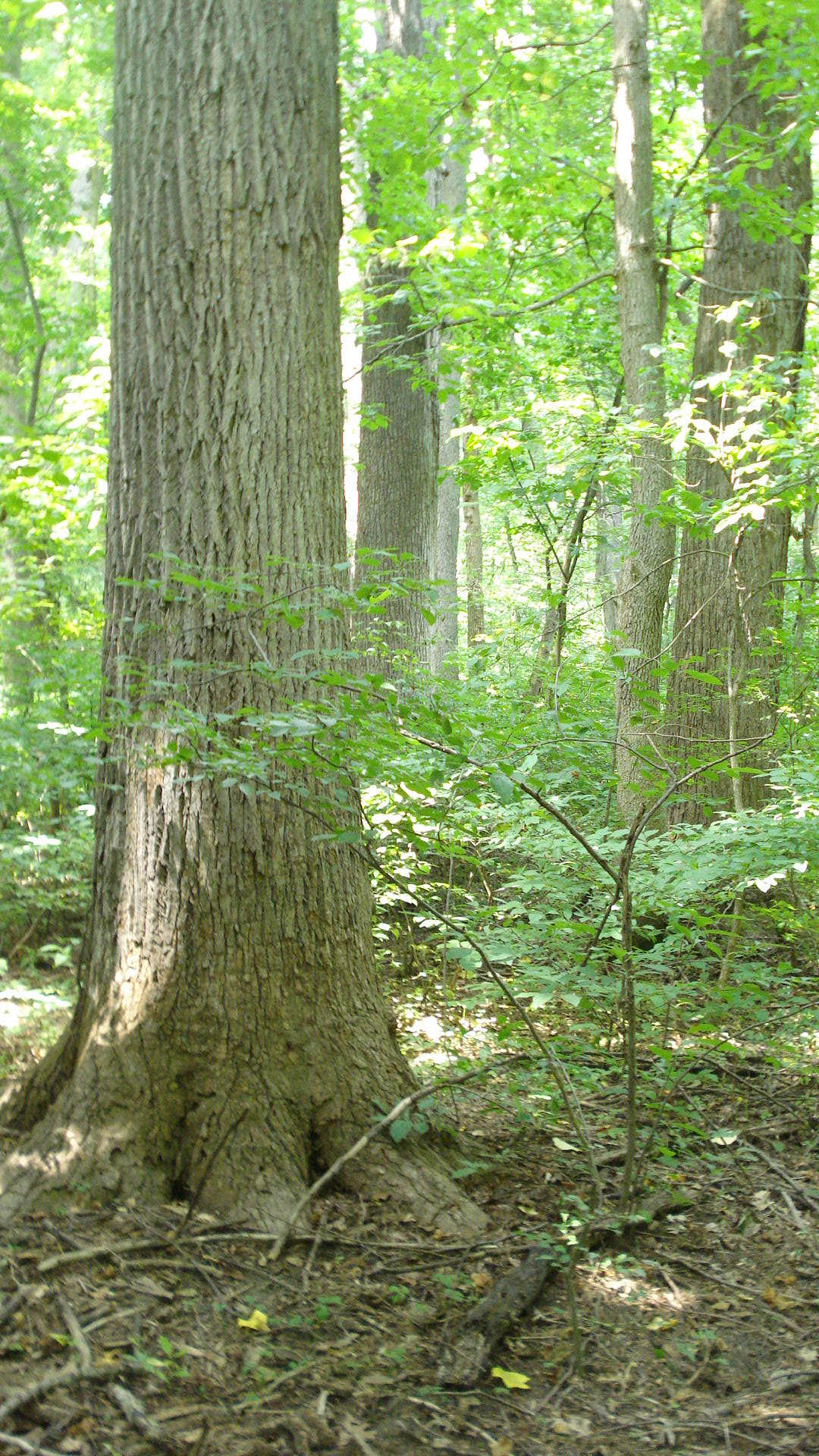
Bole of a massive tulip poplar in Belt Woods

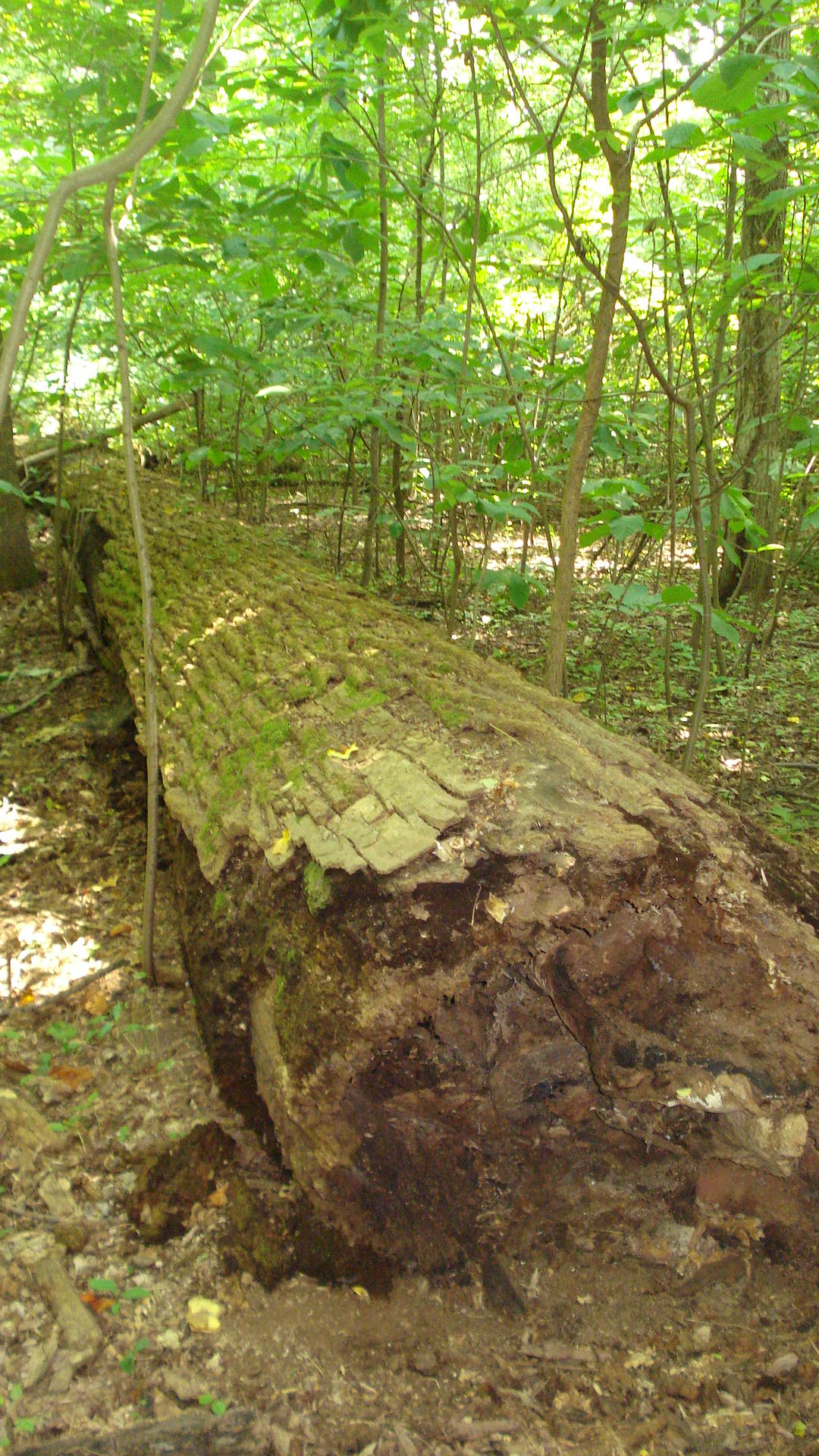
Deadfall in Belt Woods

Belt Woods is a nature reserve in Prince George's County, Maryland, U.S., containing the "South Woods", a 43-acre (170,000 m^{2}) woodland which constitutes one of the last stands of old growth hardwood forest on the Atlantic coastal plain. It is a mere 8 miles (13 km) east of Washington, D.C. Many of its white oaks and tulip poplars are more than three feet in diameter and soar more than 100 feet (30 m) before branching. The "South Woods" were designated a National Natural Landmark in 1974.

In 1994, St. Barnabas' Episcopal Church (Leeland, Maryland) sold 109 acres containing the oldest trees to the state of Maryland as a nature preserve for $628,000 Some 110 acres (0.45 km^{2}) at the site are designated a Natural Environment Area (NEA) and another 515 acres (2.08 km^{2}) are designated a Heritage Conservation Fund (HCF) site. Thus 625 acres (2.53 km^{2}) are protected in total. Within this area, the Maryland General Assembly has designated 610 acres (2.5 km^{2}) — 109 acres (0.44 km^{2}) within the NEA and 501 acres (2.03 km^{2}) within the HCF — as a special Maryland Wildland.

== History ==
Belt Woods is part of the former farm of semi-reclusive banker and gentleman farmer, Seton Belt (1870–1959). A bird breeding census first surveyed the tract in 1947; the density of Forest Interior Dwelling Species (FIDS) was then found to be 300 pairs/100 acres (1300 m^{2} per pair).

Belt was descended from 17th-century settlers in Prince George's County and owned 3,200 acres on six farms including these woods. Belt was treasurer of St. Barnabas' Episcopal Church, Leeland, Maryland and when he drafted his will in 1944, he "stipulated that the trees on his home farm should never be cut down and his 624-acre home farm never sold." He specified his other holdings should be sold, with the proceeds placed in a trust to benefit St. Barnabas. In 1976, the trustees petitioned the court and were granted a reinterpretation of the will that permitted them to sell and log the farm.

The oaks of the "North Woods", were logged in 1981 by a New Jersey firm. They harvested 563 old-growth oak and tulip trees for veneer.

Tom Horton, in his book Bay Country (1987), tells how this happened:

The bank entrusted with administering Seton Belt's estate, and the church to which he left his goods, found that the forest earned the highest accolades not just from naturalists and woodland songbirds. "Veneer quality", eager buyers from the world's leading timber concerns adjudged the massive, knot-free, straight trunks of the oaks. Debarked, steamed until soft, then sliced and peeled on huge machines into sheets just 1/4-inch thick, just a few of the Beltwoods giants would decorate acres of executive conference-room walls in warm wood tones. The church said it needed the money over and above the $10 million that old Belt had left it to build an urban home for the elderly. With the bank, it broke the will in court, and half the mighty Beltwoods fell to the chainsaw ... The forester hired by the bank explained to me his satisfaction when the veneer deal went through. From the standpoint of annual, new cellulose production, he said, the old oaks were well into the area of diminishing returns, even though they might live another century or two. "The only thing left for that particular stand of trees to do was to die and fall over", he said

This event served as a wakeup call to conservationists and an 18-year legal battle ensued between them and the Episcopal Diocese of Washington. In 1984, the state of Maryland, with partners, purchased 110 acres (0.45 km^{2}) including the "South Woods", designating them the Belt Woods Natural Environmental Area. Impending residential development necessitated the state's purchase of an additional 515 acres (2.08 km^{2}) in 1997 — known as the Belt Woods Heritage Conservation Fund site. The HCF site, which consists of the former "North" and "Central Woods" (now young forest and fields), buffers the old growth forest and forestalls further development. In all, some 625 acres (2.53 km^{2}) are protected at the site, of which most (610 acres) were designated by the Maryland General Assembly in October 1997 as the Belt Woods Wildland. Access to Belt Woods is limited to scientific study. Because of the 68th Street hazardous waste site, in February 2020, the Trustees released a draft restoration plan for public review and comment. The Trustees released a Final Restoration Plan and Environmental Assessment in July 2020. The plan’s selected project seeks to restore 109 acres of hardwood forest within the Belt Woods Natural Environment Area, a National Natural Landmark in nearby Prince George’s County, Maryland. The project will be beneficial to multiple wildlife species, provide ecological benefits to migratory birds, reduce forest fragmentation, improve forest condition, and help maintain one of the last stands of old-growth hardwoods in the Atlantic Coastal Plain.

== Ecology ==
=== Songbirds ===
Belt Woods lies within the Southeastern mixed forests ecoregion. It consists of a mosaic of small fields and woodlands and is a critical nesting area for neotropical songbirds. The density of birds breeding there is among the highest observed on the east coast. Unusually high densities of FIDS birds prevail. In 1989, the breeding bird census, which uses a territory mapping method, measured a density of more than 200 pairs/100 acres (40 ha) of FIDS, attributable largely to high densities of wood thrush and red-eyed vireo. Nine other species of FIDS birds regularly breed there, including the Kentucky warbler.

=== Flora ===
The canopy of the mesic upland hardwood forest at Belt Woods is dominated by tulip poplar and white oak. Old-growth characteristics include 200-year-old trees of over 140 feet (45 m) in height. Forty-two species of trees were measured in the "South Woods" in 2001. Prominent understory trees include flowering dogwood, spicebush, sweet haw and ironwood. The herbaceous layer, which is exceptionally dense in springtime, includes Collinsonia, Dioscorea, and broad beechfern. The narrowleaf glade fern and Wister's coralroot — both Maryland state threatened species — grow here.

== See also ==
- List of National Natural Landmarks in Maryland
- Old-growth forest
- List of old growth forests
