= Pores Knob =

Mountain peak in North Carolina, United States

Coordinates: 36°02′47″N 81°09′22″W

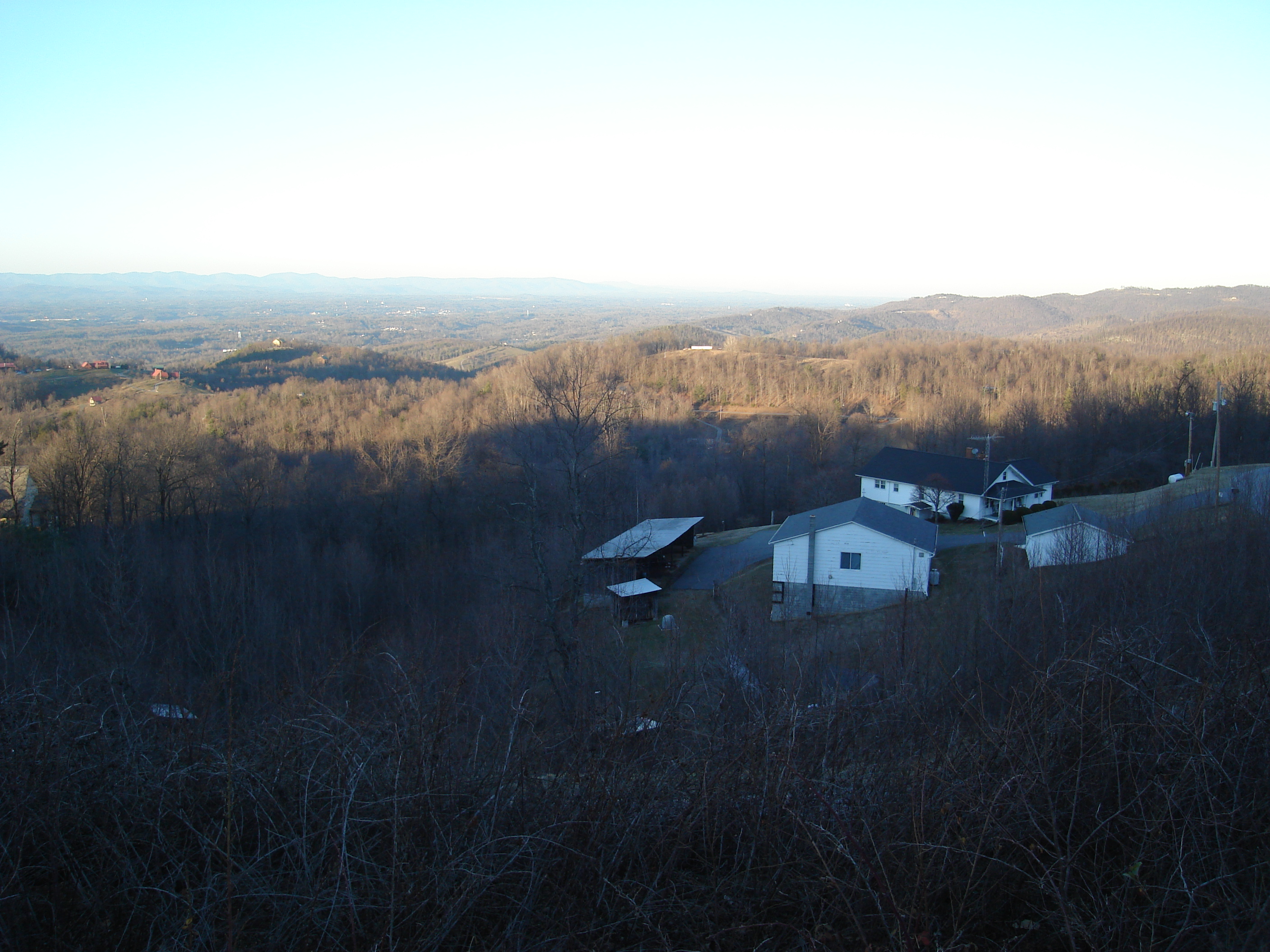
View from atop Pores Knob, the highest point in the Brushy Mountains

Pores Knob is a mountain peak located in Wilkes County, North Carolina, United States.

== Physical features ==
Pores Knob is the highest point of the Brushy Mountains chain. The Brushy Mountains are a deeply eroded spur of the much larger Blue Ridge Mountains. The summit of Pores Knob is only 2,680 feet (820 meters) above sea level, yet the mountain stands prominently above the surrounding countryside, rising close to 1,500 feet (460 meters) above its base.

== Geographical location ==
The mountain itself is nearly unconnected to any other peak in the Brushy Mountains, and could thus be considered a monadnock, or isolated mountain peak. A rough gravel road leads to the mountain's summit, which is devoid of trees but does contain several radio towers. From the summit a person can see up to 75 miles (121 km) on a clear day, and can view a large portion of the Appalachian Mountain range in North Carolina, several of the highest mountains in the state of Virginia, and the skyline of Charlotte, North Carolina, approximately 70 miles (110 km) to the south. The mountain shares its name with a small farming community which surrounds the peak.

== See also ==
- Brushy Mountains
- Moravian Falls, North Carolina
- Geography of North Carolina
