= Morgan Run Natural Environment Area =

Protected area in Maryland, United States

Coordinates: 39°28′14″N 76°59′45″W

Morgan Run Natural Environment Area is a protected area in Carroll County, Maryland. Located on 1,930 acres (7.8 km^{2}), Morgan Run features hiking and equestrian trails, catch and release trout fishing, and deer hunting.

== See also ==
- Natural Environment Area (Maryland)
- Patapsco Valley State Park
