= List of National Natural Landmarks in Maryland =

These are the six National Natural Landmarks in Maryland.

Maryland National Natural Landmarks (clickable map)

Name	Image	Date	Location	County	Ownership	Description
Battle Creek Cypress Swamp		April 1965	Prince Frederick 38.490275°N 76.590773°W	Calvert	private (The Nature Conservancy)	One of the northernmost sites of naturally occurring bald cypress (Taxodium distichum) trees in North America, and the only large stand of the trees on the western shore of Maryland. The site also contains a wide range of plant and animal life.
Belt Woods		1974	Woodmore 38.90505°N 76.76304°W	Prince George's	state (Department of Natural Resources)	One of the few remaining old-growth upland forests in the Atlantic Coastal Plain biophysiographic province. It is an example of upland hardwood forest dominated by tulip poplar and white oak. The Woods support a diverse bird population, including neotropical migrants.
Cranesville Swamp Nature Sanctuary	Cranesville Swamp	1964	39.531389°N 79.481944°W	Garrett	private (The Nature Conservancy)	A natural bowl where cool, moist conditions yield plant and animal communities more common in northern latitudes. Extends into Preston County, West Virginia.
Gilpin's Falls		1980		Cecil	private	Outcrop of undeformed early Paleozoic metavolcanic pillow basalts.
Long Green Creek and Sweathouse Branch		1977		Baltimore	state (Department of Natural Resources)	A maturing beech-tulip poplar-white oak forest.
Sugarloaf Mountain		June 1969	Frederick 39.269208°N 77.395248°W	Frederick, Montgomery	private	An outlier to the east of the main mass of the Catoctin Mountain, or a root remnant of the ancient Appalachia land mass.

== See also ==
- List of National Historic Landmarks in Maryland
