= Brushy Mountain Apple Festival =

Coordinates: 36.1594°N 81.1463°W

The Brushy Mountain Apple Festival is a one-day arts and crafts fair held annually in downtown North Wilkesboro, North Carolina. Founded in 1978, the fair is held on the first Saturday in October. Over 160,000 people visit the fair each year, and it is one of the largest single-day arts and crafts fairs in the Southeastern United States. The fair is held to celebrate the apple harvest from the nearby Brushy Mountains. Over 100 church, civic, and other non-profit organizations from Wilkes County and neighboring counties participate in the fair each year.

During the fair, the streets of North Wilkesboro's business district are closed to auto traffic for several blocks. This allows over 100 food concession stands to be set up, along with 425 arts and crafts concession stands and four large music stages. The food and crafts on display usually demonstrate the heritage and culture of the people of the Southern Appalachian Mountains. The concessions include pottery, quilt-making, woodcarving, chairmaking, blacksmiths, apple cider, fried apple pies, dried apples, apple jam, etc. Pork barbecue and chicken barbecue are also popular food items. The four music stages are also dedicated to the musical heritage of the Appalachian region. Bluegrass, Folk, Country, and Gospel music can all be heard throughout the day. Square Dancing and Clogging, forms of dance traditionally popular in the local mountains, are also displayed at the festival.

The Festival is sponsored and organized by the Brushy Mountain Ruritan Club. The Ruritan Club is a US national organization with over 1,000 clubs and approximately 25 thousand members, providing helpful service for a large variety of communities.

== COVID-19 impact ==
The 2020 Festival was cancelled on 3 August 2020 due to the COVID-19 pandemic in the United States. The 2021 Festival, the 43rd, is scheduled for 2 October.
