= Nick Easton =

American football player (born 1992)

No. 62
- Position: Offensive guard

Personal information
- Born: June 16, 1992 (age 34); Lenoir, North Carolina, U.S.
- Listed height: 6 ft 3 in (1.91 m)
- Listed weight: 303 lb (137 kg)

Career information
- High school: Hibriten (Lenoir, North Carolina)
- College: Harvard (2010–2014)
- NFL draft: 2015: undrafted

Career history
- Baltimore Ravens (2015)*; San Francisco 49ers (2015); Minnesota Vikings (2015–2018); New Orleans Saints (2019–2020)
- * Offseason or practice squad member only

Awards and highlights
- 2× First-team All-Ivy League (2013, 2014)

Career NFL statistics
- Games played: 45
- Games started: 32
- Stats at Pro Football Reference

Nicholas Easton (born June 16, 1992) is an American former professional football player who was an offensive guard in the National Football League (NFL). Easton played college football for Harvard University. In the NFL, he was a member of the Baltimore Ravens, San Francisco 49ers, Minnesota Vikings, and New Orleans Saints.

== Early life ==
Easton was a letterman in football and track and field at Hibriten High School in Lenoir, North Carolina. In football, he earned All-State honors, was twice named All-Conference and All-County, and served as team captain his senior year. As a senior, he started at center on the first undefeated regular season football team in school history. In track, he was a conference and county champion in the discus throw, placing fourth at the regional championships and qualifying for the state meet. Easton was also a four-year member of the American Field Service Club. In 2024, Easton was inducted into the Hibriten Athletic Hall of Fame.

== College career ==
Easton attended Harvard University, where he played for the Harvard Crimson football team from 2010 to 2014. He played in 24 career games for Harvard. As a senior in 2014, he was a first-team All-Ivy League, BSN All-American, third-team Football Championship Subdivision (FCS) All-American and first-team FCS North All-American selection after starting all 10 contests. Also in 2014, Easton was part of a Crimson offensive line unit that protected quarterback Scott Hosch, allowing him to set career highs in attempts, completions, passing yards and touchdowns en route to a perfect 10–0 season. He helped pave the way for running back Paul Stanton to rush for a career-high 990 yards on 147 attempts and 11 touchdowns.

As a junior in 2013, Easton saw action in 10 games, earning All-Ivy League first-team honors, College Sports Madness All-Ivy second-team and FCS All-New England team honors. Harvard's offensive line achieved an FCS Top 10 ranking for team passing efficiency (7th overall) and allowed quarterback Conner Hempel to throw for a career-high 157 completions, 1,866 yards and 15 touchdowns.

Easton did not participate on the football team in 2012.

As a sophomore in 2011, Easton appeared in four games; he was part of an offensive line unit that helped the Crimson earn an FCS No. 2 ranking in scoring offense, tallying 374 points (37.4 avg) and 51 total touchdowns. He helped pave the way for running back Treavor Scales to rush for career highs in yards, with 847 and touchdowns with 8.

He did not play in any game as a true freshman in 2010.

Easton majored in economics while at Harvard.

== Professional career ==
Pre-draft measurables
Height	Weight	40-yard dash	10-yard split	20-yard split	20-yard shuttle	Three-cone drill	Vertical jump	Broad jump	Bench press
6 ft 2 3/4 in (1.90 m)	303 lb (137 kg)	5.12 s	1.64 s	2.90 s	4.60 s	7.73 s	30.5 in (0.77 m)	9 ft 4 in (2.84 m)	29 reps
All values from Pro Day

=== Baltimore Ravens ===
Easton signed with the Baltimore Ravens as a rookie free agent on May 7, 2015. He was one of the team's most consistent players during the preseason, earning the Ravens’ top overall grade (+9.1) from Pro Football Focus (PFF). His grade from PFF was also the highest of any center in the preseason and the seventh-best grade of any position player in the NFL.

=== San Francisco 49ers ===
On September 5, 2015, Easton was acquired by the San Francisco 49ers from Baltimore in exchange for a conditional seventh-round selection in the 2016 NFL draft.

=== Minnesota Vikings ===
On October 6, 2015, the 49ers traded Easton and a 2016 sixth-round pick to the Minnesota Vikings in exchange for linebacker Gerald Hodges.

Easton made his first-career start in place of starting center Joe Berger in Week 13 of the 2016 season against the Dallas Cowboys. The following week, Easton again filled in for Berger for the second straight game after the veteran was unable to clear the concussion protocol.

Easton earned himself a starting guard spot for the Vikings in 2017, starting 12 games at left guard before suffering a fractured right ankle in Week 16. He was placed on injured reserve on December 26, 2017.

On August 13, 2018, Easton was placed on injured reserve after suffering a neck injury in training camp.

=== New Orleans Saints ===
On March 17, 2019, Easton signed a four-year $24 million contract with the New Orleans Saints to be their starting center after Max Unger retired.

On January 9, 2021, Easton was placed on injured reserve. He was released by the Saints on February 12, 2021.
