= Natural Environment Area (Maryland) =

Parcel of public land

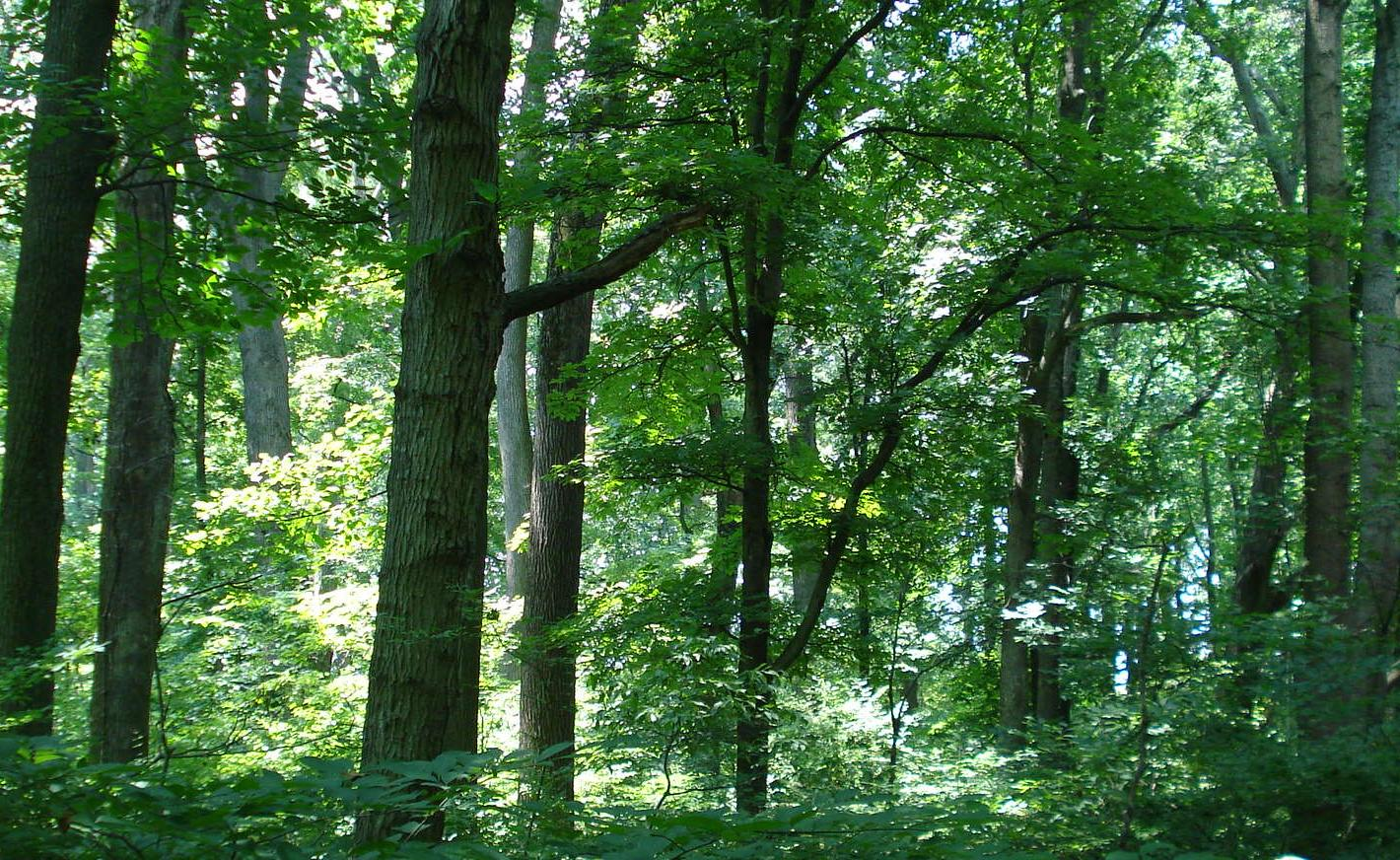
Belt Woods Natural Environment Area in Prince George's County, Maryland

A Natural Environment Area (NEA) is a unit of the Park Service of the Maryland Department of Natural Resources. These public lands are generally 1,000 acres (4 km^{2}) or more in extent and are judged to constitute a "significant natural attraction or unique geological feature". Development within an NEA is generally confined to trails, interpretive facilities and limited support facilities.

In contradistinction to Maryland Wildlands, which may only be established or removed by an act of the Maryland General Assembly, NEAs are designated by the DNR. (The more restrictive and protective designation of a Maryland Wildland, however, is sometimes established within an NEA.)

== List of Maryland NEAs ==
As of 2016, the state of Maryland managed seven NEAs covering 12,698 acres (51.39 km^{2}) of land.

NEA name	County	Area
Belt Woods Natural Environment Area	Prince George's	625 acres (2.53 km^{2})
Mattawoman Natural Environment Area	Charles	1,727 acres (6.99 km^{2})
Morgan Run Natural Environment Area	Carroll	1,930 acres (7.8 km^{2})
Severn Run Natural Environment Area	Anne Arundel	1,759 acres (7.12 km^{2})
Soldiers Delight Natural Environment Area	Baltimore	2,078 acres (8.41 km^{2})
Youghiogheny Wild River Natural Environment Area	Garrett	4,129 acres (16.71 km^{2})
Zekiah Swamp Natural Environment Area	Charles	450 acres (1.8 km^{2})

== See also ==
- List of Maryland state forests
- List of Maryland state parks
- List of Maryland wildlife management areas
- Maryland BayStat
