= Southeastern mixed forests =

Temperate broadleaf and mixed forests ecoregion of the United States

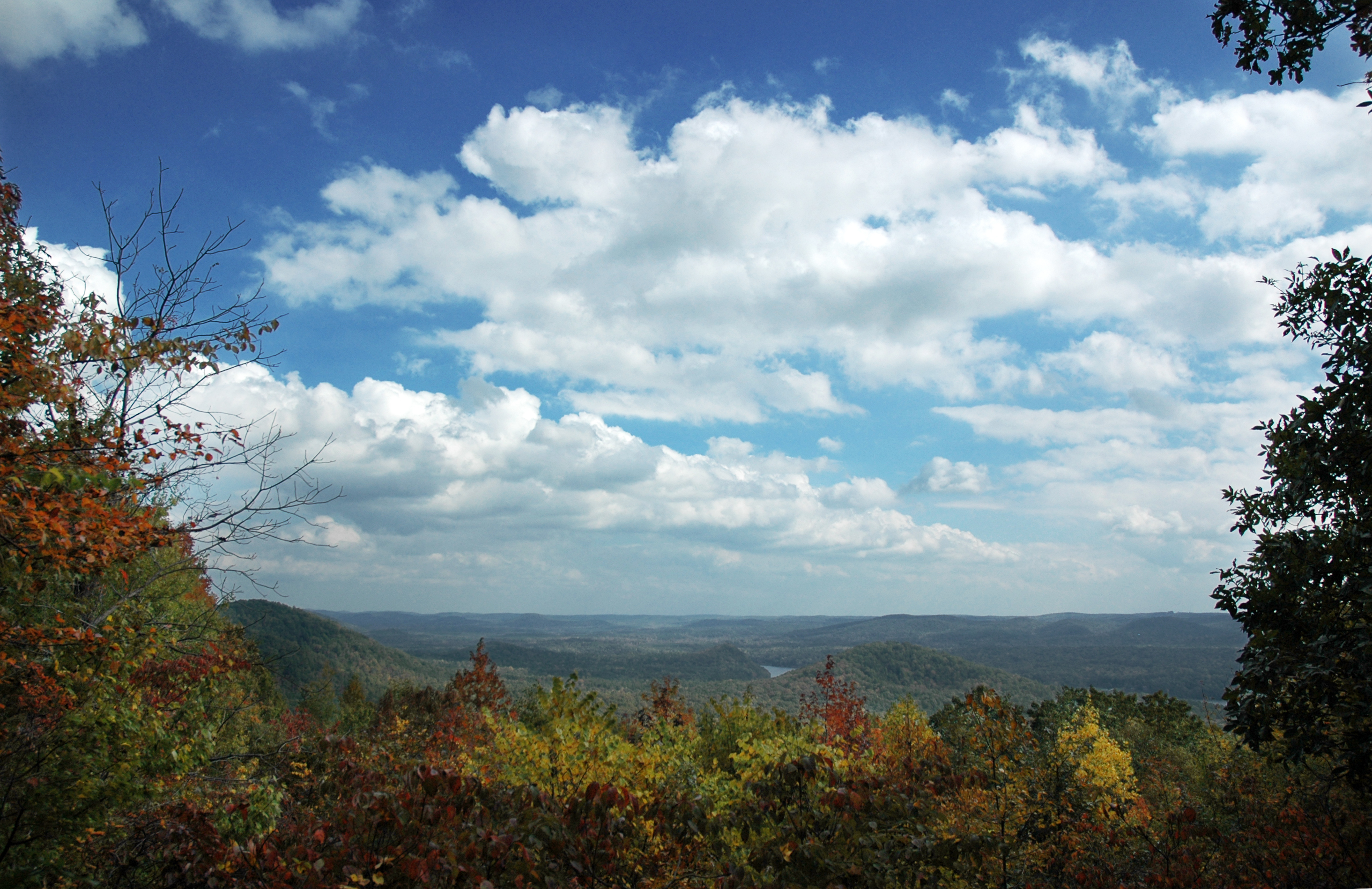
- Uwharrie Mountains in North Carolina

Ecology
- Realm: Nearctic
- Biome: Temperate broadleaf and mixed forest
- Bird species: 212
- Mammal species: 66

Geography
- Area: 347,800 km^{2} (134,300 mi^{2})
- Country: United States
- States: List: New Jersey; Pennsylvania; Maryland; Virginia; North Carolina; South Carolina; Georgia; Alabama; Mississippi; Louisiana; Tennessee
- Climate type: Humid subtropical (Cfa)

Conservation
- Habitat loss: 26.905%
- Protected: 3.73%

The Southeastern mixed forests are an ecoregion of the temperate broadleaf and mixed forest biome, in the lower portion of the Eastern United States.

== Setting ==
This ecoregion covers the Piedmont region of the eastern United States, stretching in a broad arc from extreme southwest New Jersey southwest to Mississippi. It is distinguished from neighboring ecoregions by elevation and vegetation. At lower elevations to the east are the Middle Atlantic coastal forests on the Atlantic Plain. Similarly, the Southeastern conifer forests occupy the Gulf Coastal Plain to the south. Higher, and to the north and west, are the Appalachian-Blue Ridge forests and the Appalachian mixed mesophytic forests of the Appalachian Mountains. Small stands of these forests extend into north Florida.

== Climate ==
This ecoregion lies within the Cfa Köppen climate zones, and the Cf and Do Trewartha climate zones, placing it in the humid subtropical climate category, with hot, humid summers, and mild to cool winters. The coldest month mean temperature at or above freezing, and significant precipitation in all seasons.

== Flora ==
Both oaks (Quercus spp.) and hickories (Carya spp.) are abundant in this ecoregion. Additionally, some 3,635 species of native herbaceous and shrub species have been recorded here.

American chestnut (Castanea dentata) was formerly an important tree in this ecoregion, but its population was destroyed by the chestnut blight in the early 20th century. It still persists as an understory tree, but is often killed by the blight before it matures.

=== Oak-hickory forests ===
The most common oaks (Quercus spp.) of this ecoregion are white oak (Quercus alba), northern red oak (Quercus rubra), black oak (Quercus velutina), and scarlet oak (Quercus coccinea). Black and scarlet grow in open forests. Black oak grows in nearly single-species stands on dry, exposed sites. Scarlet oak grows in various habitats. Chestnut oak (Quercus prinus) is found on ridgetops.

The hickories (Carya spp.) of this ecoregion are identifiable by their pinnately compound leaves. They include pignut (Carya glabra) and mockernut hickory (Carya tomentosa), both of which grow on a variety of sites from dry ridges to mesic habitats.

Understory trees include sassafras (Sassafras albidum), hophornbeam (Ostrya virginiana), and green hawthorn (Crataegus viridis). Flowering dogwood (Cornus florida) blooms in early spring.

Shrubs include highbush blueberry (Vaccinium corymbosum), lowbush blueberry (Vaccinium angustifolium), mapleleaf viburnum (Viburnum acerifolium), huckleberry (Gaylussacia baccata), mountain laurel (Kalmia latifolia).

Common pine (Pinus spp.) species are shortleaf pine (Pinus echinata) and loblolly pine (Pinus taeda). The pine forests are regenerated by fire. Without fire, hardwood species grow in below the pines.

Sugar maple (Acer saccharum), a shade tolerant tree, grows amid the oaks and hickories in the northern part of this ecoregion.

Small stands of these forests extend into North Florida

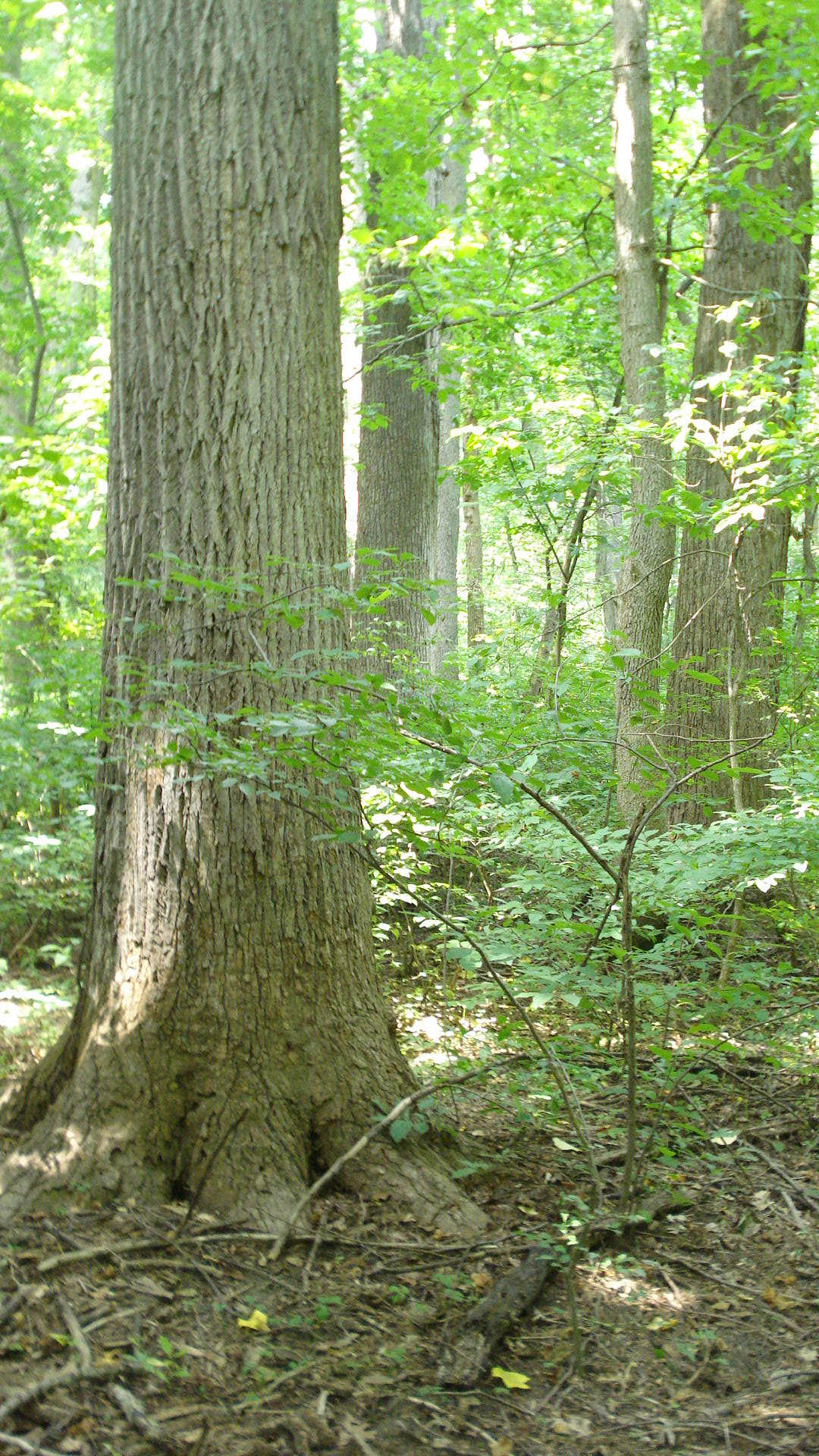
Mesic forest in Belt Woods, Maryland

=== Mesic forests ===
Mesic forests occur in fertile, mesic, low-elevation habitats such as deep ravines and sheltered north- or east-facing slopes. Dominant trees include American beech (Fagus grandifolia), tulip tree (Liriodendron tulipifera), northern red oak, white ash (Fraxinus americana), black maple (Acer nigrum), sugar maple (Acer saccharum), basswood (Tilia americana), and bitternut hickory (Carya cordiformis).

Understory trees include pawpaw (Asimina triloba) and painted buckeye (Aesculus sylvatica). Small stands of these forests extend into North Florida.

=== Mesic mixed hardwood forests ===
Mesic mixed hardwood forests grow on mesic uplands, ravines, lower slopes, and well-drained flatwoods. Typical trees are American beech, tulip tree, various oaks and hickories, and several other hardwoods. Understory trees include American hornbeam (Carpinus caroliniana), flowering dogwood (Cornus florida), and American strawberry-bush (Euonymus americanus). Small stands of Mesic mixed hardwood forest extend into North Florida.

=== Successional forests ===
Successional forests include eastern juniper (Juniperus virginiana) and black locust (Robinia pseudoacacia).

== Remaining intact habitat ==
- Sumter National Forest
- Uwharrie National Forest
- Bienville National Forest
- Talladega National Forest SW unit
- Oconee National Forest
- Piedmont National Wildlife Refuge
- Sauratown Mountains
- Brushy Mountains (North Carolina)
- South Mountains (North Carolina)
- Tunica Hills in southwestern Mississippi and eastern Louisiana
- Arlington Woods, Arlington House, The Robert E. Lee Memorial, Virginia
- Duke Forest
- William B. Umstead State Park
- Eno River State Park
- Guilford College
- Supawna Meadows National Wildlife Refuge
- Pee Dee National Wildlife Refuge in the Great Pee Dee River basin of piedmont North Carolina
- Belt Woods, Prince George's County, Maryland

== See also ==
- List of ecoregions in the United States (WWF)
