= Hibriten Mountain =

Mountain in North Carolina, United States

- Hibriten Mountain in 2026

Highest point
- Elevation: 2,211 ft (674 m)
- Coordinates: 35°54′25″N 81°29′22″W

Geography
- Location within North Carolina
- Location: Caldwell County, North Carolina, U.S.
- Parent range: Brushy Mountains
- Topo map: USGS Kings Creek

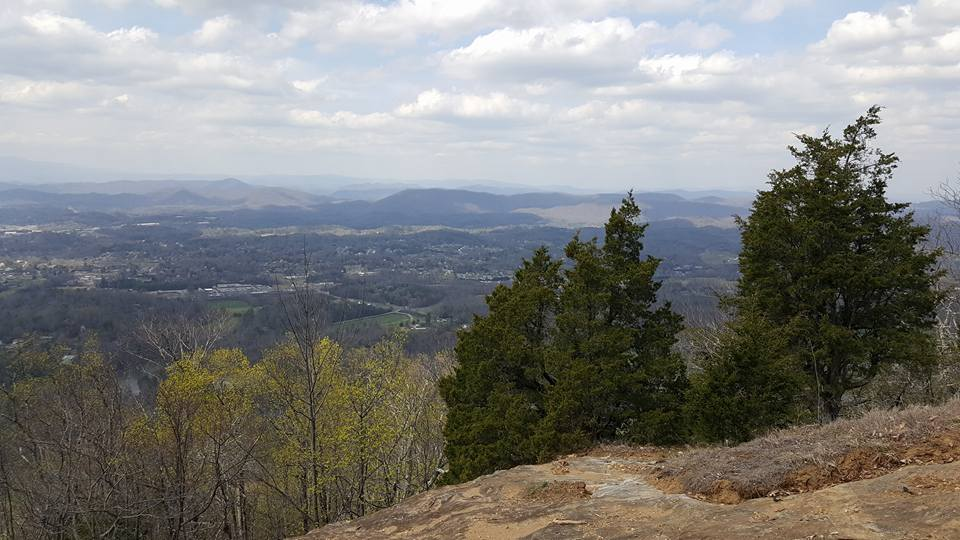
View from the top of Hibriten Mountain of the city of Lenoir and greater outskirts of Caldwell County

Hibriten Mountain, located just east of Lenoir, North Carolina, marks the western end of the Brushy Mountains range. At 2,211 feet, the mountain's summit is nearly 1,000 feet above the surrounding terrain. The summit is well known to the locals for its large welcome light which glows at night in the shape of a star in the weeks before Christmas and a cross before Easter.

The name "Hibriten" stems from Brighton, England. A local resident who was impressed with the beauty of Brighton, England, thought the mountain on the east side of Lenoir should have a sophisticated name since it was the “high” point of Lenoir. Combining “High” and “Brighton,” the name was eventually shortened to one word, “Hibriten.”

Its geographic and symbolic importance to the area was demonstrated when, in 1966, a new high school was opened at the base of the peak. It was named Hibriten High School in honor of the mountain.

A fire tower was erected at the summit in 1927. The 100-step structure is considered one of the most important fire towers in western North Carolina and offers glimpses of Caldwell, Alexander, Avery, Burke, Watauga, and Wilkes counties.

The star/cross light display at the peak was built in 1954. The star was first shown during the Christmas season of that year, and the cross was first shown during Easter of the following year in 1955.

A hang gliding ramp was built at the west end of the mountain top in 1982 by The Buzzard Club.

Hibriten Mountain is privately owned and accessible to authorized individuals only. The dirt road leading to the top is not a public hiking trail.
