= Brushy Mountains (North Carolina) =

Mountain range in North Carolina, United States

Coordinates: 36°02′45″N 81°09′25″W

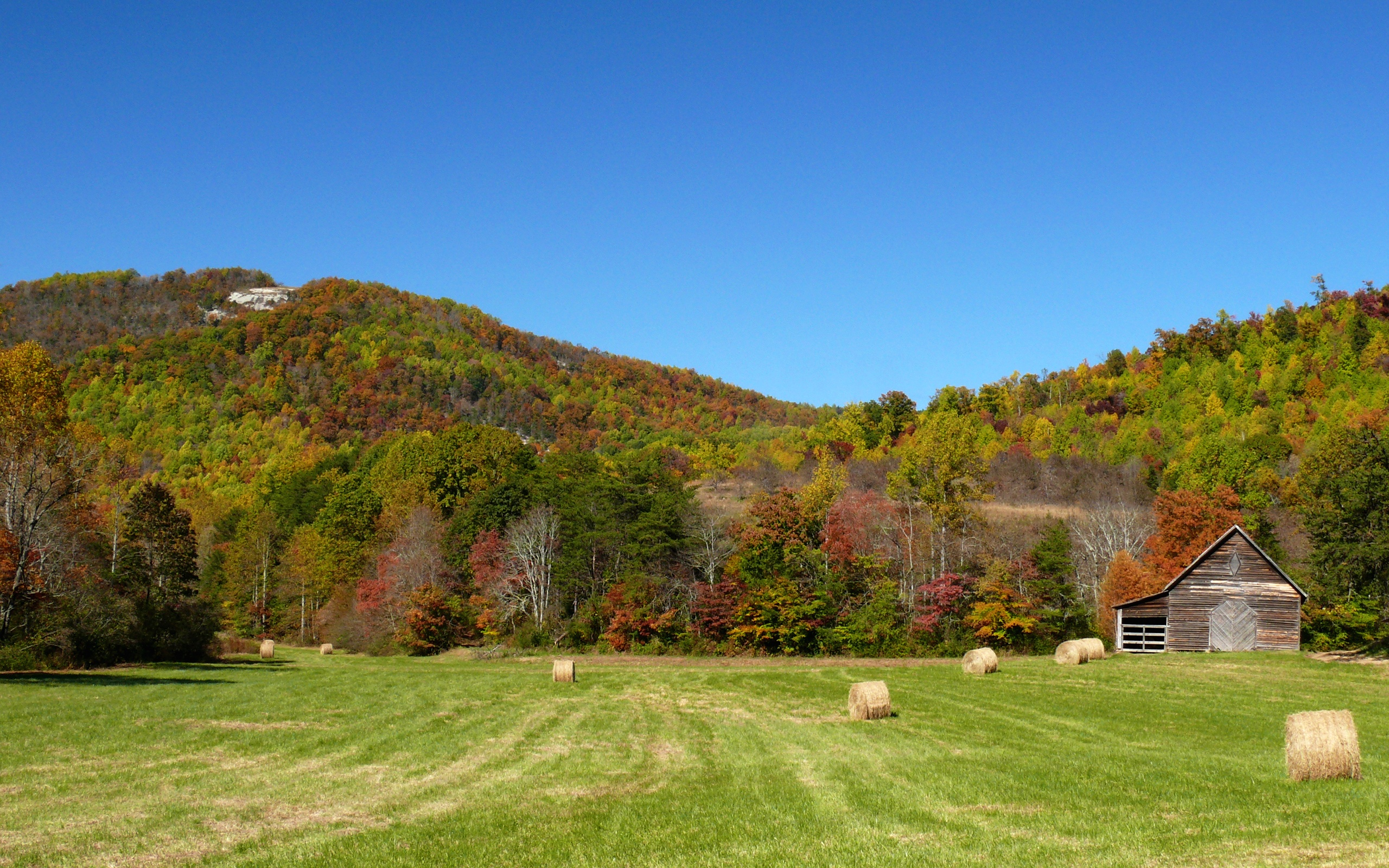
Autumn in the Brushy Mountains.

The Brushy Mountains are a mountain range located in northwestern North Carolina. They are an isolated "spur" of the much larger Blue Ridge Mountains, separated from them by the Yadkin River valley. A deeply eroded range, they move from the southwest to the northeast, and cross five counties in North Carolina: Caldwell, Alexander, Wilkes, Iredell, and Yadkin.

The Brushy Mountains divide, for much of their courses, the waters of the Yadkin River and the Catawba River, two of central North Carolina's largest rivers. The range is approximately 45 miles (72 km) long, but only 4 to 8 miles wide. The highest point in the chain is Pores Knob (2,680 feet, 820 meters), in Wilkes County. Among the other notable peaks in the range are Hibriten Mountain in Caldwell County, which marks the western end of the Brushy Mountains and is a prominent landmark in the city of Lenoir, North Carolina; Hickory Knob, the highest point in Alexander County, North Carolina; Click Mountain (535 m), the highest point in Yadkin County; and Fox Mountain, the highest point in Iredell County, North Carolina. The "Brushies", as they are often called by locals, usually rise from 300 to 800 feet (240 m) above the surrounding countryside, with few peaks rising more than a thousand feet above their base. The forests on the mountains are part of the Southeastern mixed forests ecoregion.

The Mountains are primarily known for their abundance of fruit orchards. The last Saturday in July is the Brushy Mountain Peach and Heritage Festival hosted by the Community Center and held in Downtown Wilkesboro. On the first Saturday in October, the Brushy Mountain Apple Festival is hosted by the Brushy Mountain Ruritan Club and held in North Wilkesboro, North Carolina each year to celebrate the harvest. The region was also once known as a hotbed of "moonshining", or the production of illegal homemade liquor. Several of the earliest stars of stock-car racing in the 1940s and 1950s got their start in the moonshining business in the Brushy Mountains. James Larkin Pearson, a newspaper publisher and editor who served as North Carolina's official Poet Laureate from 1953 to 1981, was born and raised in the Brushy Mountains, and lived in the Brushies his entire life. Much of his poetry was based on his life in the Brushy Mountains.
