= National Register of Historic Places listings in Wilkes County, North Carolina =

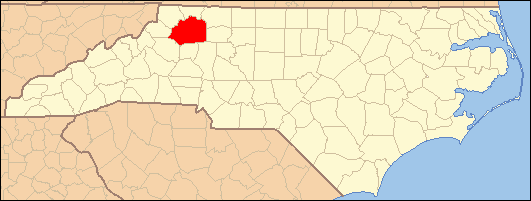

This list includes properties and districts listed on the National Register of Historic Places in Wilkes County, North Carolina. Click the "Map of all coordinates" link to the right to view an online map of all properties and districts with latitude and longitude coordinates in the table below.

== Current listings ==
This National Park Service list is complete through NPS recent listings posted March 14, 2025.

	Name on the Register	Image	Date listed	Location	City or town	Description
1	Brown-Cowles House and Cowles Law Office	Brown-Cowles House and Cowles Law Office	August 24, 1982 (#82003522)	200 and 106 E. Main St. 36°08′57″N 81°09′02″W	Wilkesboro	
2	Claymont Hill	Claymont Hill	September 12, 1985 (#85002369)	Western side of SR 2303 along Ronda-Clingman Rd. 36°12′39″N 80°55′40″W	Ronda	
3	Robert Cleveland Log House	Robert Cleveland Log House	February 1, 1972 (#72001003)	Wilkes Heritage Museum, 100 E. Main St; 36°08′59″N 81°09′09″W	Wilkesboro	Relocated from near Pulear to near the Old Wilkes County Jail in downtown Wilkesboro in 1986.
4	Downtown Main Street Historic District	Downtown Main Street Historic District	May 9, 2003 (#03000392)	Roughly the 800 and 900 blocks of Main St. 36°09′34″N 81°08′47″W	North Wilkesboro	
5	Downtown Wilkesboro Historic District	Downtown Wilkesboro Historic District	April 30, 2009 (#09000290)	Bounded roughly by Cowles and Corporation Sts., Henderson Dr., and Woodland Boulevard; 36°08′54″N 81°09′03″W	Wilkesboro	
6	Elkin Creek Mill	Elkin Creek Mill	April 29, 1982 (#82003521)	SR 2045; 36°16′40″N 80°52′29″W	West Elkin	
7	Federal Building	Federal Building	August 24, 1982 (#82003523)	201 W. Main St. 36°08′47″N 81°09′32″W	Wilkesboro	
8	J. T. Ferguson Store	J. T. Ferguson Store	August 24, 1982 (#82003524)	11 E. Main St. 36°08′53″N 81°09′04″W	Wilkesboro	
9	Thomas B. Finley House	Thomas B. Finley House	May 15, 2008 (#08000415)	1014 E St. 36°09′41″N 81°09′03″W	North Wilkesboro	
10	Thomas B. Finley Law Office	Thomas B. Finley Law Office	August 24, 1982 (#82003525)	Broad and North Sts. 36°08′56″N 81°09′04″W	Wilkesboro	
11	Harmon School		December 29, 2020 (#100005992)	Sheets Gap Rd., .6 mi. west of jct. with Buckwheat Branch Rd. 36°21′50″N 81°19′17″W	Laurel Springs vicinity	
12	Holbrook Farm	Holbrook Farm	November 29, 1978 (#78001985)	West of Traphill on SR 1743; 36°20′35″N 81°03′26″W	Traphill	
13	Benjamin Hubbard House		January 29, 2009 (#08001390)	Northern side of U.S. Route 18, 1 mile east of NC 1106; 36°05′13″N 81°12′22″W	Moravian Falls	
14	Johnson-Hubbard House	Johnson-Hubbard House	August 24, 1982 (#82003527)	113 E. Main St. 36°08′54″N 81°09′03″W	Wilkesboro	
15	Lincoln Heights School	Lincoln Heights School	September 11, 2018 (#100002932)	197 Lincoln Heights Rd. 36°08′54″N 81°07′46″W	Wilkesboro	
16	Old Wilkes County Jail	Old Wilkes County Jail	February 18, 1971 (#71000628)	N. Bridge St. 36°08′56″N 81°09′09″W	Wilkesboro	
17	St. Paul's Episcopal Church and Cemetery	St. Paul's Episcopal Church and Cemetery	October 19, 1982 (#82001308)	Cowles St. between Woodland Boulevard and West St. 36°08′57″N 81°09′18″W	Wilkesboro	
18	Southern Railway Depot	Southern Railway Depot	September 10, 2004 (#04000965)	Junction of 9th St. and CBD Loop; 36°09′31″N 81°08′45″W	North Wilkesboro	
19	Traphill Historic District		May 22, 1980 (#80002905)	SR 1002 and SR 1749; 36°20′48″N 81°01′26″W	Traphill	
20	Wilkes County Courthouse	Wilkes County Courthouse	May 10, 1979 (#79001764)	E. Main St. between Bridge and Broad Sts. 36°08′55″N 81°09′07″W	Wilkesboro	Now the Wilkes County Heritage Museum
21	Wilkes Hosiery Mills	Wilkes Hosiery Mills	April 30, 2008 (#08000369)	407 F. St. 36°09′56″N 81°08′32″W	North Wilkesboro	
22	Wilkesboro Presbyterian Church	Wilkesboro Presbyterian Church	August 24, 1982 (#82003528)	205 E. Main St. 36°08′54″N 81°08′59″W	Wilkesboro	
23	Wilkesboro-Smithey Hotel	Wilkesboro-Smithey Hotel	August 24, 1982 (#82003529)	Broad and E. Main Sts. 36°08′55″N 81°09′04″W	Wilkesboro	

== Former listing ==
	Name on the Register	Image	Date listed	Date removed	Location	City or town	Description
1	Montfort Stokes House		March 16, 1972 (#72001537)	August 24, 1973	SR 1144, W of SR 1143	Wilkesboro	Destroyed by fire.

== See also ==
- National Register of Historic Places listings in North Carolina
- List of National Historic Landmarks in North Carolina
