= Trap Hill =

Trap Hill or Traphill may refer to:

- Trap Hill, West Virginia, an unincorporated community in Raleigh County
- Traphill, North Carolina, a rural community located in northeastern Wilkes County
