= WKBC =

WKBC could refer to two radio stations in North Wilkesboro, North Carolina, United States:

- WKBC (AM), a radio station (800 AM)
- WKBC-FM, a radio station (97.3 FM)
