= Brown-Cowles House and Cowles Law Office =

Historic house in North Carolina, United States

- U.S. National Register of Historic Places
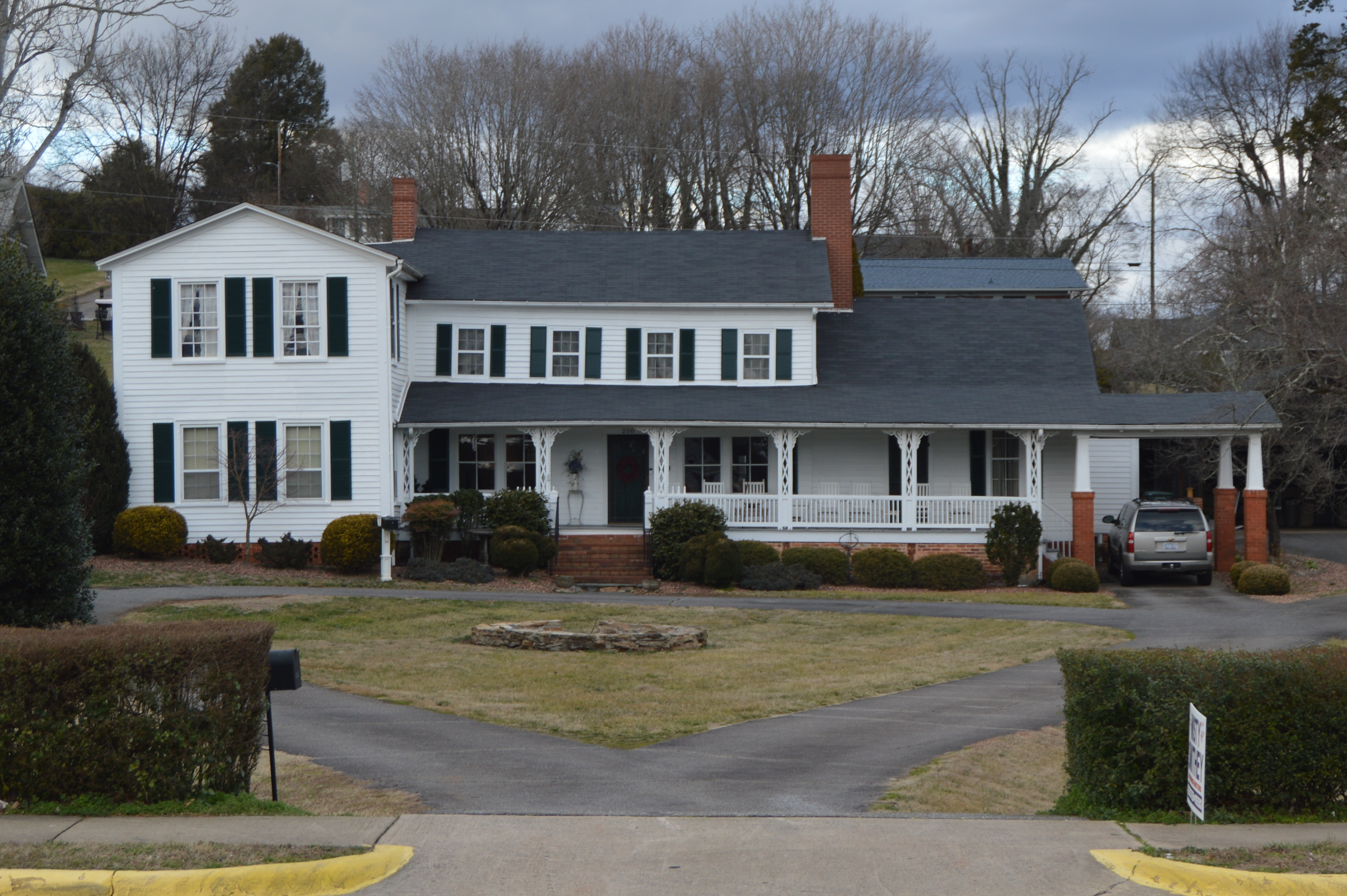
- Facade, seen from the street

- Location within North Carolina Location within the United States
- Location: 200 and 106 E. Main St., Wilkesboro, North Carolina
- Coordinates: 36°8′57″N 81°9′1″W
- Area: 1.3 acres (0.53 ha)
- Built: c. 1834, c. 1871
- Architectural style: Late Victorian, Federal
- MPS: Wilkesboro MRA
- NRHP reference No.: 82003522
- Added to NRHP: August 24, 1982

Brown-Cowles House and Cowles Law Office, also known as the Paul Osborne House and Law and Bride Cottage, is a historic home and law office located at Wilkesboro in Wilkes County, North Carolina, United States. The Cowles Law Office was built about 1871, and is a small one-story frame building with gable roof and single-shoulder end chimney. The original section of the Brown-Cowles House was built about 1834, and enlarged with a two-story wing by 1885 and enlarged again between 1920 and 1926. It is a two-story frame dwelling with Federal style detailing. Also on the property are the contributing curing house and kitchen. It was the home of William H. H. Cowles (1840–1901), a lawyer and four-term Congressman during the 1880s and 1890s.

It was listed on the National Register of Historic Places in 1982.

== See also ==
- Alfred Moore Scales Law Office: NRHP listing in Madison, North Carolina
- Thomas B. Finley Law Office: NRHP listing also in Wilkesboro, North Carolina
- Archibald Henderson Law Office: NRHP listing in Salisbury, North Carolina
- Nash Law Office: NRHP listing in Hillsborough, North Carolina
- Zollicoffer's Law Office: NRHP listing in Henderson, North Carolina
- National Register of Historic Places listings in Wilkes County, North Carolina
