= Thomas B. Finley Law Office =

- U.S. National Register of Historic Places
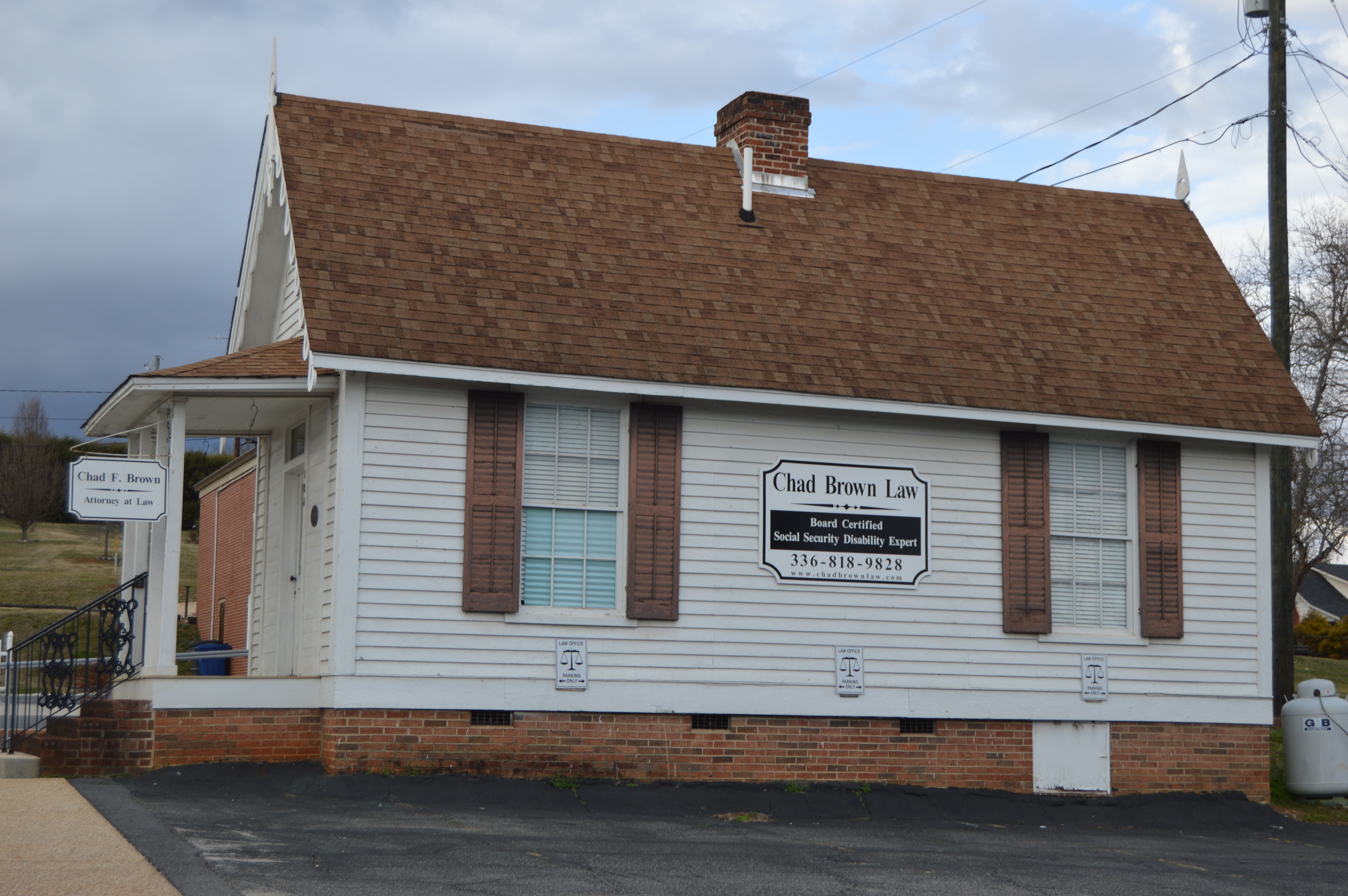
- Southern side and front

- Location within North Carolina Location within the United States
- Location: Broad and North Sts., Wilkesboro, North Carolina
- Coordinates: 36°8′57.3″N 81°9′4.5″W
- Area: less than one acre
- Architectural style: Carpenter Gothic
- MPS: Wilkesboro MRA
- NRHP reference No.: 82003525
- Added to NRHP: August 24, 1982

Thomas B. Finley Law Office, also known as the J. F. Jordan Law Office, is a historic law office located at Wilkesboro, Wilkes County, North Carolina. It was built during the early 1880s, and is a small one-story frame building one room wide and two deep. It has sawnwork bargeboards and decorative finials in the Carpenter Gothic style. It is owned by the Wilkes Heritage Museum.

It was listed on the National Register of Historic Places in 1982. The Thomas B. Finley House in North Wilkesboro was listed in 2008.

== See also ==
- Alfred Moore Scales Law Office: NRHP listing in Madison, North Carolina
- Brown-Cowles House and Cowles Law Office: NRHP listing also in Wilkesboro, North Carolina
- Archibald Henderson Law Office: NRHP listing in Salisbury, North Carolina
- Nash Law Office: NRHP listing in Hillsborough, North Carolina
- Zollicoffer's Law Office: NRHP listing in Henderson, North Carolina
- National Register of Historic Places listings in Wilkes County, North Carolina
