= J. L. Hemphill House =

Historic house in North Carolina, United States

- U.S. National Register of Historic Places
- Location within North Carolina Location within the United States
- Location: 203 N. Brook St., Wilkesboro, North Carolina
- Coordinates: 36°8′49″N 81°9′53″W
- Area: 4 acres (1.6 ha)
- Built: 1899
- Built by: Hemphill, J.L.
- Architectural style: Queen Anne
- MPS: Wilkesboro MRA
- NRHP reference No.: 82003526
- Added to NRHP: August 24, 1982

J. L. Hemphill House, also known as the Lowe House or Woodie House, is a historic home located at Wilkesboro, Wilkes County, North Carolina. It was built in 1899, and is a two-story, Queen Anne style frame dwelling. It has a central hip-roofed block with slightly projecting gabled "wings" on all four sides. It features a 2 1/2-story polygonal corner tower with bell-cast roof and finial and one-story wraparound porch with sawnwork decoration.

It was listed on the National Register of Historic Places in 1982.
