= Appalachian Sports Network =

Collegiate sports radio network

The Appalachian Sports Network is a group of 17 radio stations that carry Appalachian State University sports. The flagship station is WKBC-FM 97.3 in North Wilkesboro, North Carolina. The network had previously been known as the Appalachian ISP Sports Network; when ISP Sports was bought by IMG Worldwide subsidiary, IMG College, in 2010, the network became the Appalachian IMG Sports Network. The IMG was dropped when IMG and Learfield Sports merged to form Learfield IMG College in 2018.

== Broadcast Team ==
The current broadcast team for the Appalachian Sports Network from Learfield.

- Adam Witten – Football Lead Announcer
- Brandon Turner – Football Color Analyst
- Matt Present – Basketball Lead Announcer & Football Home Sideline Reporter
- David Ware – Football Road Sideline Reporter
- Daniel Wilson – Studio Host
- Marc Miller – Studio Engineer

== Affiliates ==
The following stations are network affiliates as of 2022.

Station Call Letters	Frequency	Frequency City
WKBC-FM	97.3 FM	North Wilkesboro, NC, Charlotte, NC
WATA	1450 AM	Boone, NC
WCOG	1320 AM, 105.3 FM	Winston-Salem, NC
WHKP	1450 AM	Hendersonville, NC
WXNC, WNOW	1060 AM, 1030 AM	Charlotte, NC
WETB	790 AM, 93.7 FM	Johnson City, TN
WBRM	1250 AM, 103.9 FM	Marion, NC

== External list ==
- 2019–20 football affiliates
