= Norma Bonniwell =

American architect

- Born: January 23, 1877; North Carolina, U.S.
- Died: December 24, 1961 (age 84); Windsor, North Carolina, U.S.
- Occupation(s): Architect, furniture designer

Norma May Bonniwell King (January 23, 1877 – December 24, 1961) was an American architect who worked with her father, George C. Bonniwell, in the firm of Bonniwell and Daughter in North Carolina. She is credited with design of one building that is listed on the U.S. National Register of Historic Places. Works by Bonniwell were exhibited at the World's Columbian Exposition in Chicago in 1893, and at the Cotton States and International Exposition in Atlanta in 1895.

== Early life ==
Norma Bonniwell was born in North Carolina, the daughter of George Capes Bonniwell and Kate Snedaker Bonniwell. Her father was an industrialist and architect from Philadelphia. Her sister Josephine and brother James also worked in architecture, and her brother WIlliam Clarence Bonniwell was a builder and orange grower in Florida.

== Works ==
Bonniwell planned buildings in North Carolina and South Carolina, including a church, a hotel, and private residences, as a member of her father's architecture firm. She also designed architectural elements. Her design for an elaborately carved cabinet was part of the North Carolina display at The Woman's Building during the Chicago World's Exposition in 1893. She designed a special mantel made of native North Carolina woods, given by the state of North Carolina to Georgia for the Cotton States and International Exposition in 1895. She opened an architecture office in Raleigh in 1899.

- Thomas B. Finley House, designed 1893, 1014 E St. North Wilkesboro, North Carolina, listed in the National Register of Historic Places
- A building at Lenoir College in Hickory, North Carolina
- W. A. Thomas House, 302 West End Avenue, Statesville, North Carolina
- Cabinet (1893), for the Woman's Building, Chicago World's Exposition
- Mantel (1895), gift to the state of Georgia
- First Methodist Episcopal Church South (1895–1896), Hickory, North Carolina
- Poston, Boshamer, and Thomas houses (1897) in Iredell, North Carolina

== Personal life ==
Bonniwell lived in Hickory and Windsor, North Carolina. She sang in a "Scotch Musicale" given by the St. Cecilia Society in Hickory in 1898. She married William Peele King in November 20, 1901. Their son William Bonniwell King was president of the North Carolina Society of Professional Engineers. She died in 1961, at the age of 84, at Bertie Memorial Hospital in Windsor.
