= Zollicoffer's Law Office =

Historic building in North Carolina, US

- U.S. National Register of Historic Places
- U.S. Historic district – Contributing property
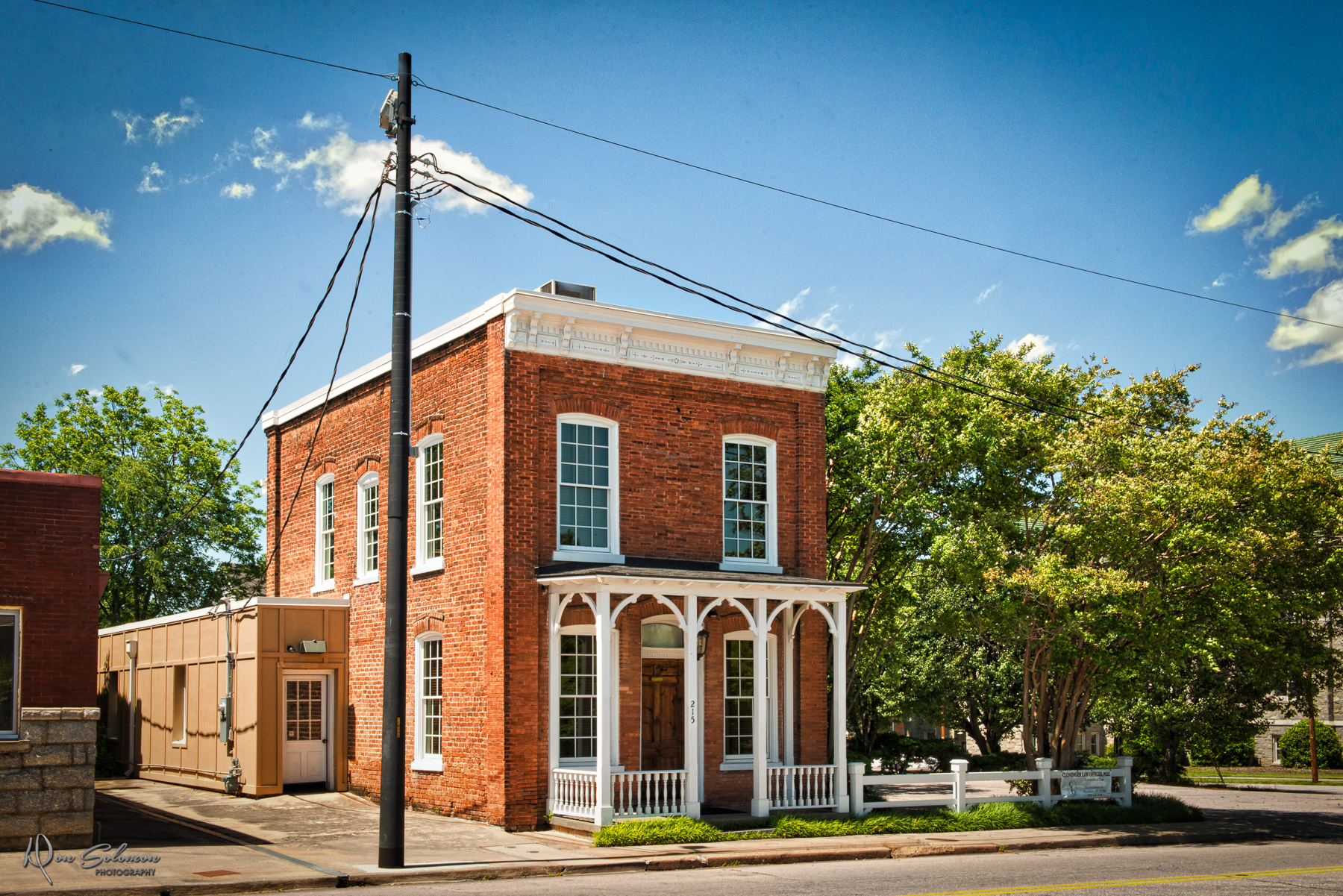

- Location within North Carolina Location within the United States
- Location: 215 N. Garnett St., Henderson, North Carolina
- Coordinates: 36°19′41″N 78°24′6″W
- Area: less than one acre
- Built: 1887
- Architectural style: Italianate
- NRHP reference No.: 78001975
- Added to NRHP: June 13, 1978

Zollicoffer's Law Office is a historic office building located in Henderson, Vance County, North Carolina. It was built in 1887, and is a two-story, two bay by two bay, brick building with Italianate-style design elements. It is associated with A.C. Zollicoffer, who was prominent in local and regional legal, political, and business circles.

It was listed on the National Register of Historic Places in 1978. It is located in the Henderson Central Business Historic District.

== See also ==
- Alfred Moore Scales Law Office: NRHP listing in Madison, North Carolina
- Brown-Cowles House and Cowles Law Office: NRHP listing in Wilkesboro, North Carolina
- Thomas B. Finley Law Office: NRHP listing in Wilkesboro, North Carolina
- Archibald Henderson Law Office: NRHP listing in Salisbury, North Carolina
- Nash Law Office: NRHP listing in Hillsborough, North Carolina
- National Register of Historic Places listings in Vance County, North Carolina
