= Lincoln Heights School =

Historic building in North Carolina, US

- U.S. National Register of Historic Places
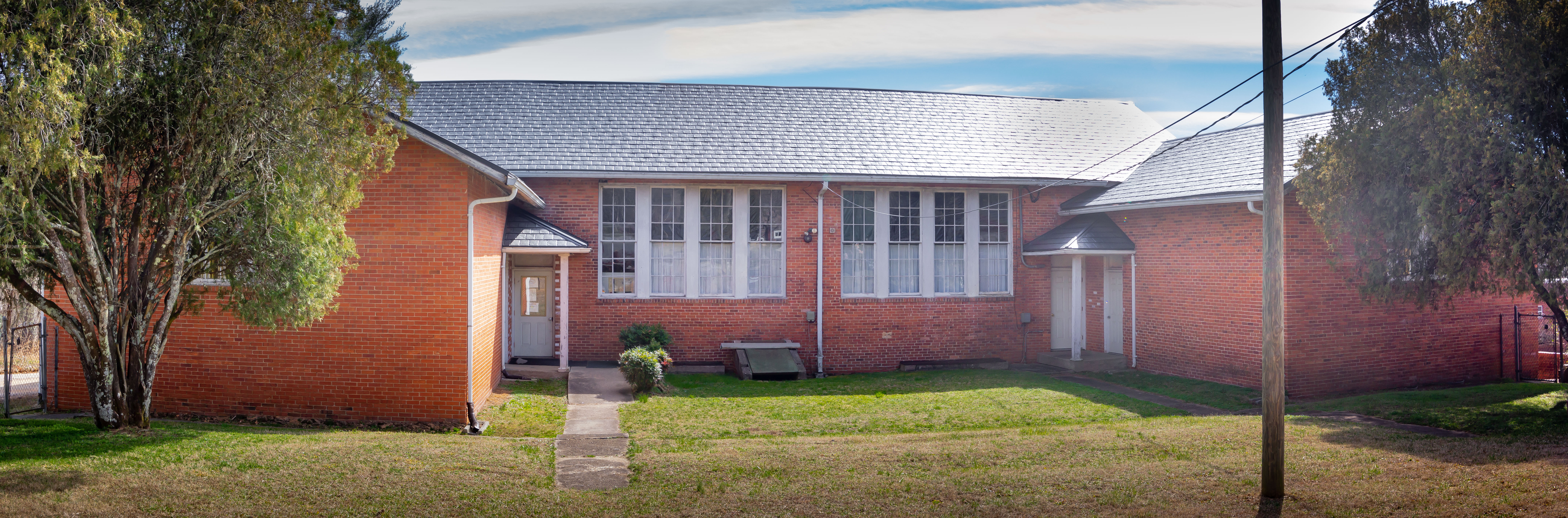
- Lincoln Heights School (March 5, 2021)

- Location within North Carolina Location within the United States
- Location: 197 Lincoln Heights Rd., Wilkesboro, North Carolina
- Coordinates: 36°8′54″N 81°7′46″W
- Area: 9 acres (3.6 ha)
- Built: 1924
- MPS: Wilkesboro MRA
- NRHP reference No.: 100002932
- Added to NRHP: September 11, 2018

Lincoln Heights School was a historic six-teacher Rosenwald School. Built-in 1924, the buildings of the school are now listed with National Register of Historic Places for its significance in education of African American children across Wilkes County, North Carolina.

== History ==
The school was constructed in 1924, but the facility was expanded to a 14-classroom structure between 1926 and 1950. The H-shaped building is located at the end of Lincoln Heights School Road, off what now is Old U.S. 421, in Wilkesboro. The additional buildings includes an agricultural shop combined with a cafeteria, a high school building, and a gymnasium - all were constructed between 1956 and 1963. In 1968, with the integration of Wilkes County schools, Lincoln Heights was closed down.

Lincoln Heights was funded by Rosenwald Fund, established in 1917 by Julius Rosenwald. It is one of the largest and only 16 brick Rosenwald School buildings nationwide constructed.
