= Archibald Henderson Law Office =

- U.S. National Register of Historic Places
- U.S. Historic district – Contributing property
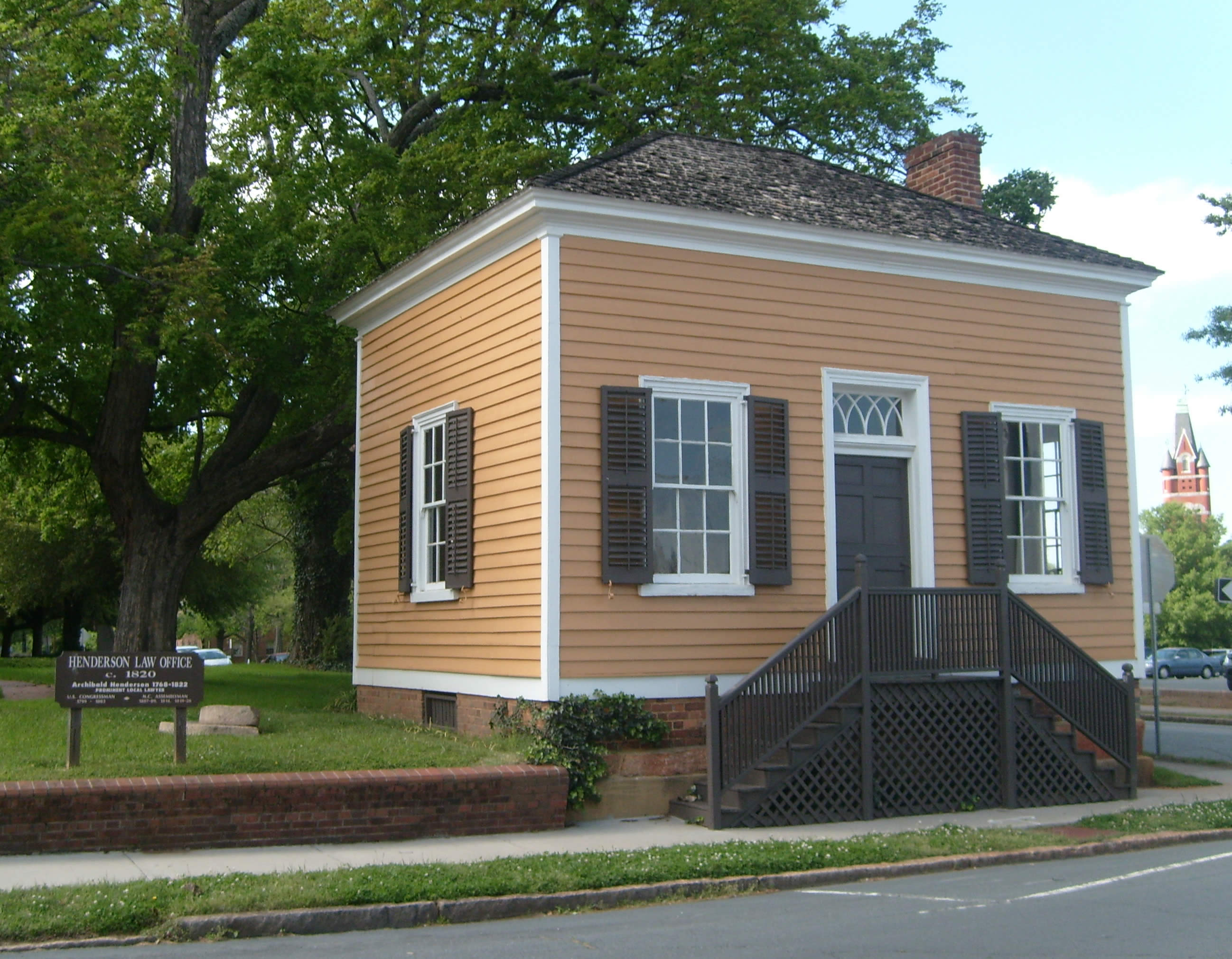
- Archibald Henderson Law Office, April 2012

- Location within North Carolina Location within the United States
- Location: Church and Fisher Sts., Salisbury, North Carolina
- Coordinates: 35°40′3″N 80°28′20″W
- Area: 0.3 acres (0.12 ha)
- Built: 1796
- NRHP reference No.: 72000993
- Added to NRHP: January 20, 1972

The Archibald Henderson Law Office is a historic law office building located at Salisbury, Rowan County, North Carolina.

== History ==
The Law Office was built in 1796, and is a one-story, one room, frame building with a low hipped roof and a brick foundation. It was the law office of Congressman and North Carolina politician Archibald Henderson (1768–1822). Upon his death, the law office was inherited by his daughter, Jane Caroline Henderson, who married Congressman and jurist, Nathaniel Boyden (1796–1873).

The Office was listed on the National Register of Historic Places in 1972. It is located in the Salisbury Historic District.

== See also ==
- Alfred Moore Scales Law Office: NRHP listing in Madison, North Carolina
- Brown-Cowles House and Cowles Law Office: NRHP listing in Wilkesboro, North Carolina
- Thomas B. Finley Law Office: NRHP listing in Wilkesboro, North Carolina
- Nash Law Office: NRHP listing in Hillsborough, North Carolina
- Zollicoffer's Law Office: NRHP listing in Henderson, North Carolina
- National Register of Historic Places listings in Rowan County, North Carolina
