= Wilkesboro Presbyterian Church =

Historic church in North Carolina, United States

- U.S. National Register of Historic Places
- U.S. Historic district – Contributing property
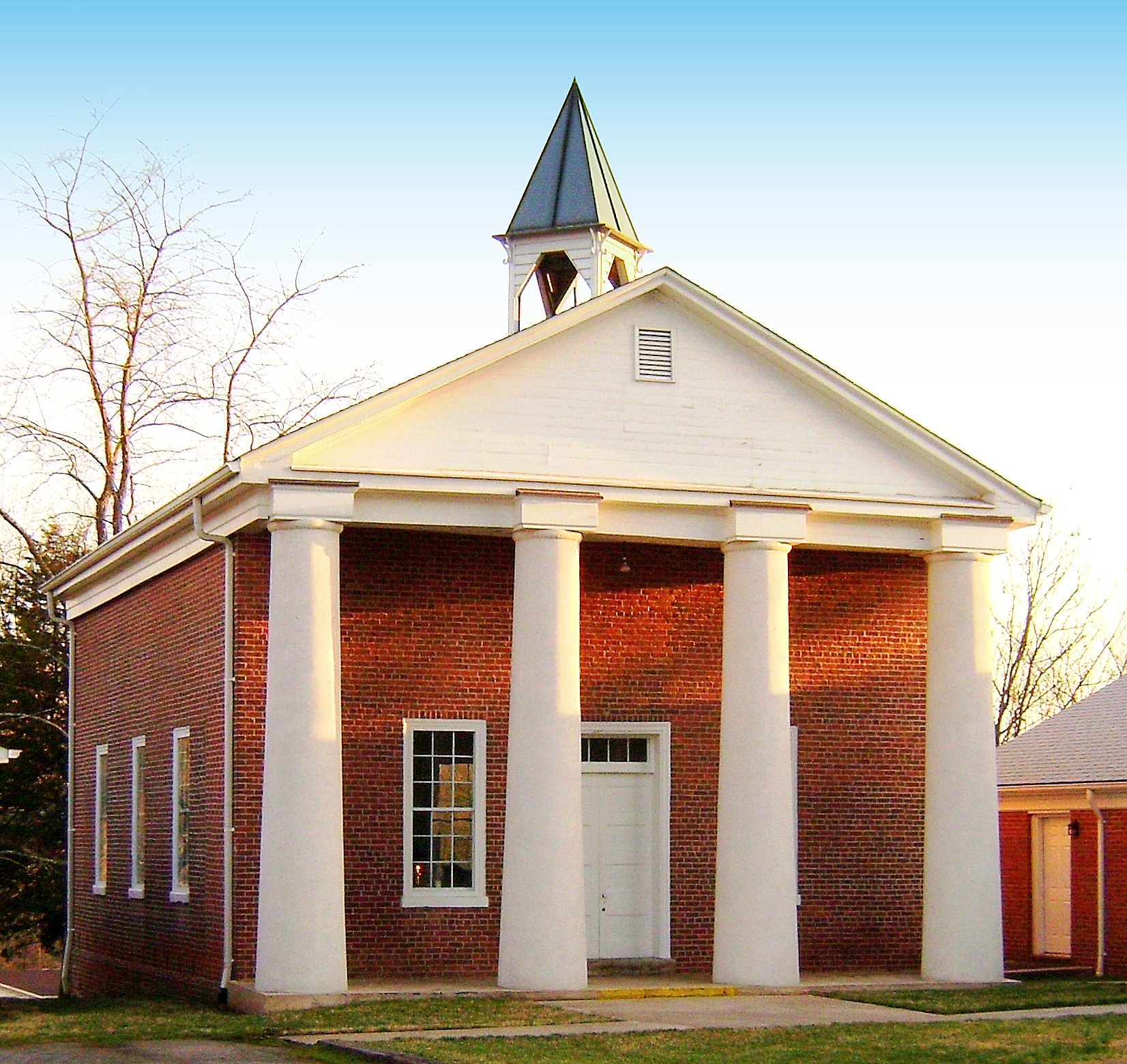

- Location within North Carolina Location within the United States
- Location: 205 E. Main St., Wilkesboro, North Carolina
- Coordinates: 36°8′54″N 81°8′59″W
- Area: less than one acre
- Built: 1849
- Architect: Dameron, D.
- Architectural style: Greek Revival
- MPS: Wilkesboro MRA
- NRHP reference No.: 82003528
- Added to NRHP: August 24, 1982

Wilkesboro Presbyterian Church is a historic church at 205 E. Main Street in Wilkesboro, North Carolina. It was built in 1849–50 in the Greek Revival style then popular, with a prominent tetrastyle portico. The brick exterior is otherwise plain, with a somewhat incongruous Victorian-era belfry over the portico. The interior is similarly plain, with plastered walls and a wood board ceiling. The church was built by a man named Dameron for $1,040.

The building was added to the National Register of Historic Places in 1982. It is located in the Downtown Wilkesboro Historic District.
