= Alfred Moore Scales Law Office =

- U.S. National Register of Historic Places
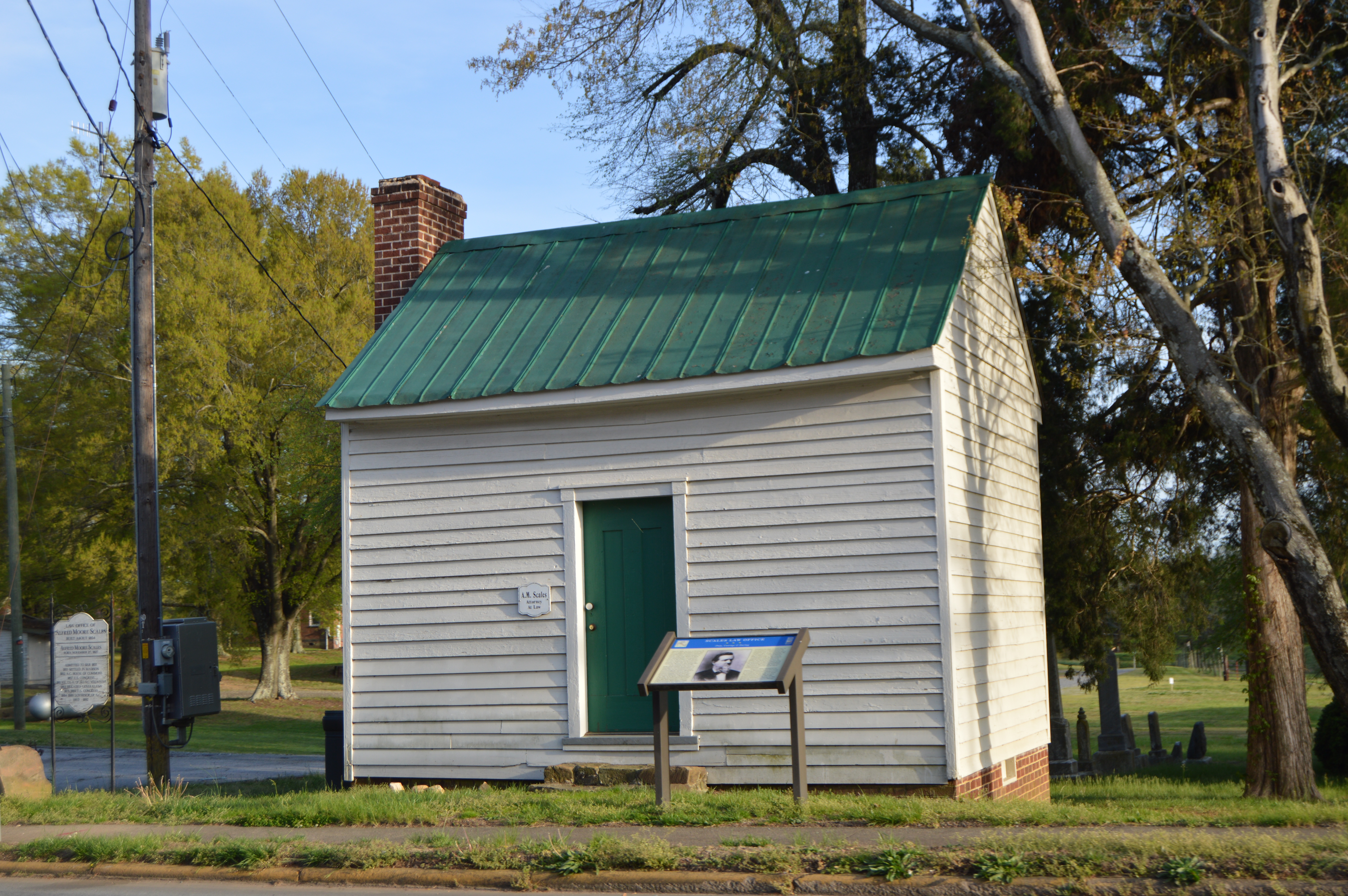
- Front and western side

- Location within North Carolina Location within the United States
- Location: 307 Carter St., Madison, North Carolina
- Coordinates: 36°23′21″N 79°57′17″W
- Area: less than one acre
- Built: 1856
- NRHP reference No.: 82003503
- Added to NRHP: April 29, 1982

Alfred Moore Scales Law Office is a historic law office building located at Madison, Rockingham County, North Carolina. It was built in 1856, and moved to its present location in the 1920s. It is a one-story gable-roofed frame structure sheathed in plain weatherboarding. It was the law office of Alfred Moore Scales, lawyer, American Civil War veteran, politician and governor of North Carolina from 1885–1890.

It was listed on the National Register of Historic Places in 1982.

== See also ==
- Brown-Cowles House and Cowles Law Office: NRHP listing in Wilkesboro, North Carolina
- Thomas B. Finley Law Office: NRHP listing in Wilkesboro, North Carolina
- Archibald Henderson Law Office: NRHP listing in Salisbury, North Carolina
- Nash Law Office: NRHP listing in Hillsborough, North Carolina
- Zollicoffer's Law Office: NRHP listing in Henderson, North Carolina
- National Register of Historic Places listings in Rockingham County, North Carolina
