= St. Paul's Episcopal Church and Cemetery =

Historic site in Wilkes County, North Carolina, US

- U.S. National Register of Historic Places
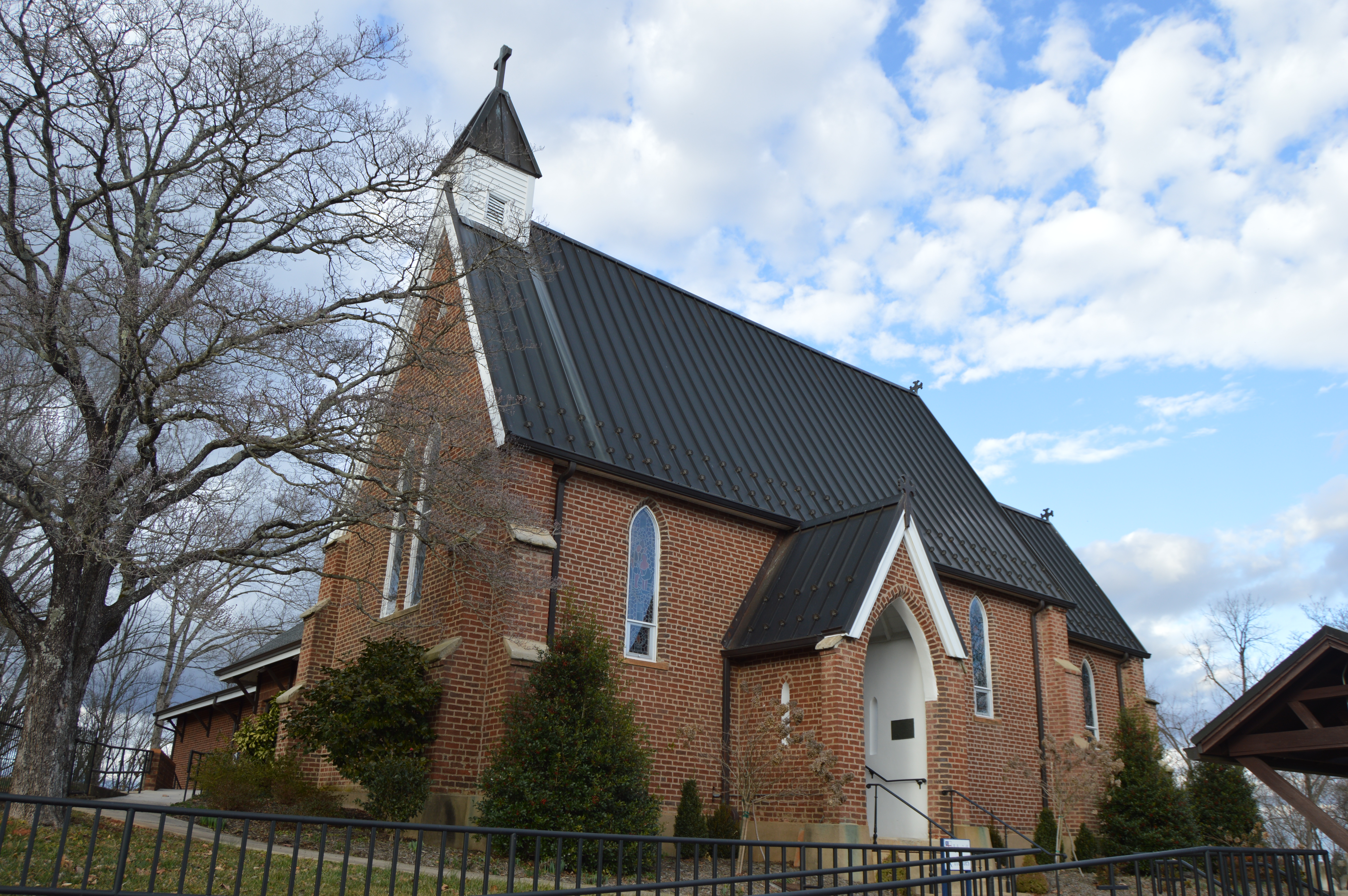
- Front and southern side

- Location within North Carolina Location within the United States
- Location: Cowles St. between Woodland Blvd. and West St., Wilkesboro, North Carolina
- Coordinates: 36°8′57″N 81°9′18″W
- Area: 2.8 acres (1.1 ha)
- Built: 1848
- Architectural style: Gothic Revival
- MPS: Wilkesboro MRA
- NRHP reference No.: 82001308
- Added to NRHP: October 19, 1982

St. Paul's Episcopal Church and Cemetery is a historic church on Cowles Street between Woodland Boulevard and West Street in Wilkesboro, North Carolina. It was added to the National Register of Historic Places in 1982 as a Historic Place in Wilkes County, North Carolina.

St. Paul's was built in 1848 and is the most important example of the Gothic Revival style in Wilkesboro as well as being typical of many U.S. Episcopal churches built during the mid-19th century. A small brick structure, the church incorporates many Gothic features similar to those of English medieval parish churches; these include a steep gable roof, corner buttresses, lancet arched windows and doors, and plentiful Gothic interior detailing.

== See also ==
- List of cemeteries in North Carolina
- National Register of Historic Places listings in Wilkes County, North Carolina
