= Wilkes Transportation Authority =

Bus transportation company in Wilkesboro, North Carolina

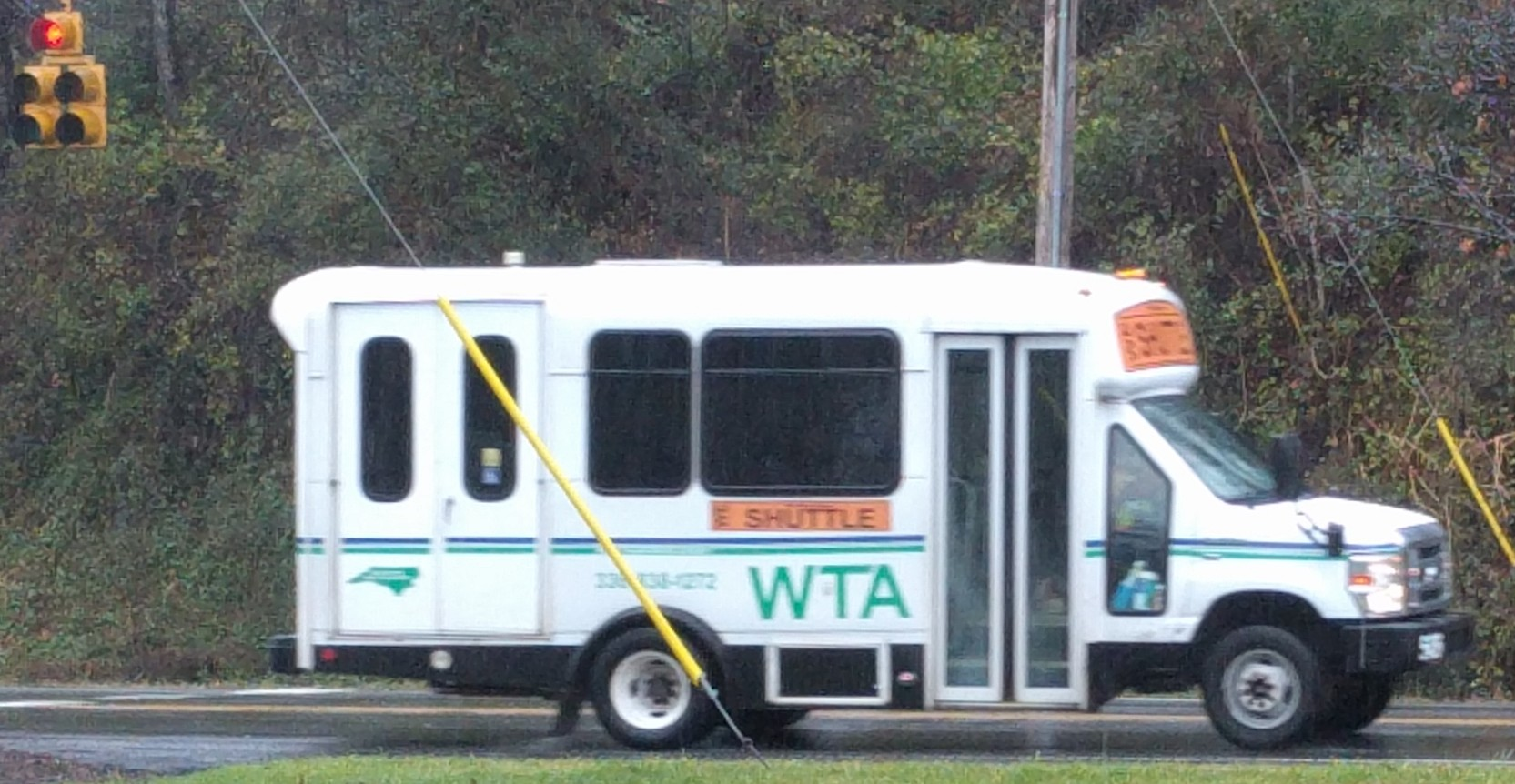
- A WE Shuttle bus turns right after leaving the West Park stops, #6 and #7.
- Founded: 1991
- Headquarters: 1010 Spring Street; Wilkesboro, NC 28697
- Locale: North Wilkesboro; Wilkesboro
- Service area: Wilkes County
- Service type: Bus
- Stops: 23 (scheduled)
- Website: http://www.wta1.org/index.php

The Wilkes Transportation Authority, or WTA, provides North Wilkesboro and Wilkesboro, North Carolina with regularly scheduled service through the two towns. Rural service is also provided anywhere in the county with prior scheduling along with service to certain locations outside of Wilkes County. WTA utilizes a fleet of vans and buses to serve their routes. WTA began operating in 1991 and remains the only public transportation option for the population.

== Services ==
Regularly scheduled routes are served by vehicles marked "WE Shuttle" along the front while vehicles marked "WTA" along the front are used for rural requests as well as out-of-county requests. All vehicles are marked "WTA" along each side and have a green image of the state on the door with "North Carolina Public Transportation" within it. The price to board the WE Shuttle is $1.00 while the pricing for rural service varies depending on location, but costs between $4.00 and $24.00. Every bus is equipped with entrances for disabled individuals.

== WE Shuttle ==
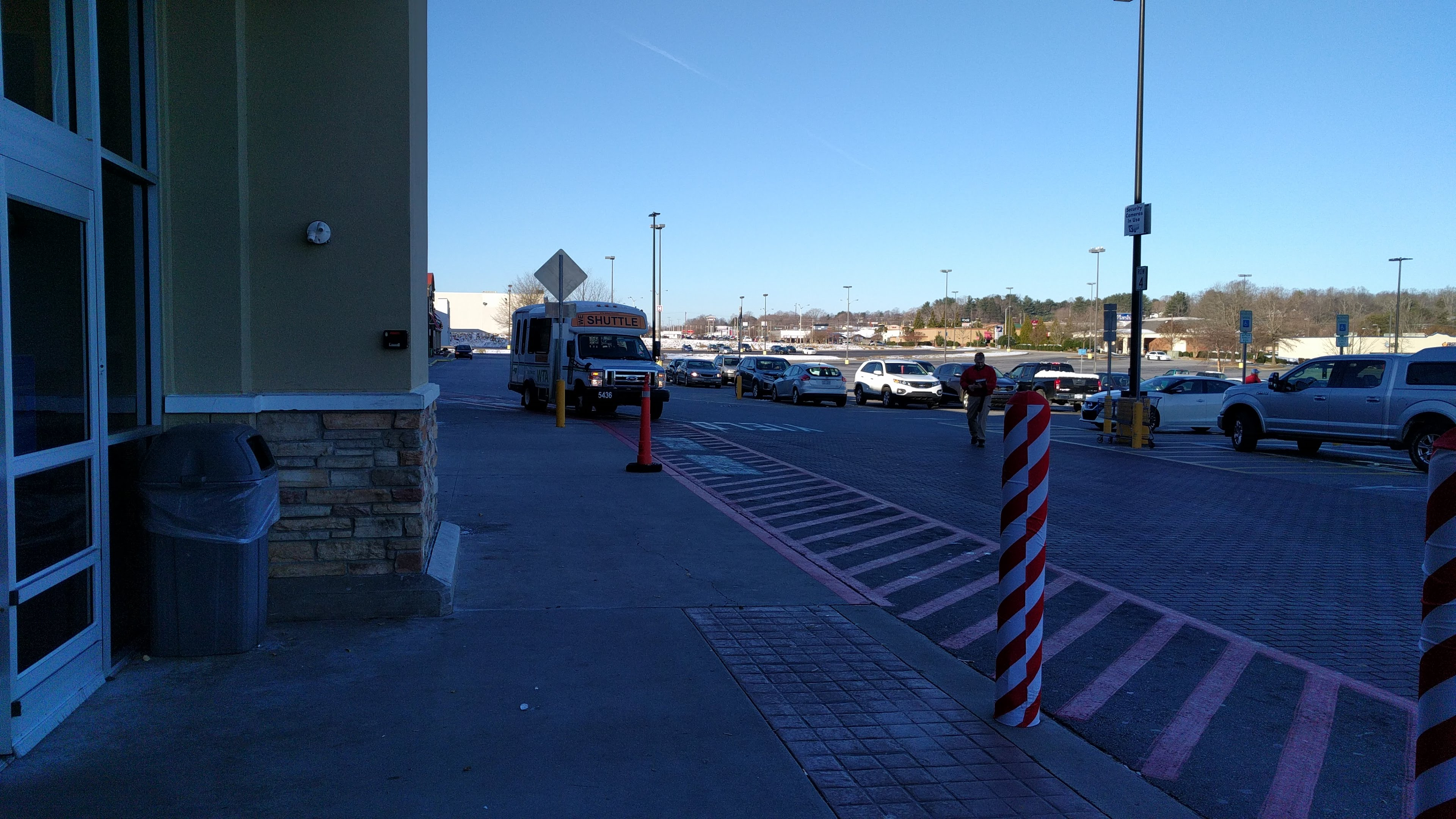
A WE Shuttle bus picking up passengers at stop #4, WalMart.

The Wilkes Express Shuttle, known simply as WE Shuttle, is the only scheduled public transportation service in Wilkes County. There is only one bus line running in a single direction. It makes twenty-three stops at several commercial, residential, and medical locations within the boros, as well as a few other locations such as post offices. The entire loop takes just over an hour and is run ten times a day with several vehicles on weekdays between 6:30 in the morning and 6:30 in the evening.

=== Tokens ===
Tokens are a currency used on WTA scheduled buses. Tokens can be purchased by the bus driver or at the WTA office.

== See also ==
- Wilkes County, North Carolina
- North Wilkesboro, North Carolina
- Wilkesboro, North Carolina
