= Nash Law Office =

- U.S. National Register of Historic Places
- U.S. Historic district – Contributing property
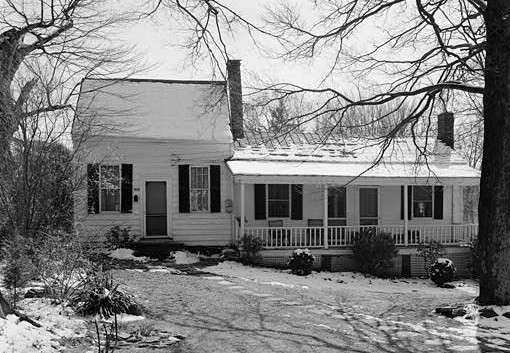
- Nash Law Office, HABS photo, February 1965

- Location within North Carolina Location within the United States
- Location: 143 W. Margaret Lane, Hillsborough, North Carolina
- Coordinates: 36°4′27″N 79°6′5″W
- Area: 9.9 acres (4.0 ha)
- Built: 1801
- NRHP reference No.: 71000609
- Added to NRHP: September 28, 1971

Nash Law Office is a historic office building located at Hillsborough, Orange County, North Carolina. It was built in 1801, and is a small one-story, frame building with a gable roof and low brick foundation. It has a brick exterior end chimney and a small one-story wing added in 1865. The building housed the law office of jurist Frederick Nash (1781-1858). Following his death it housed a school and was purchased by the Hillsborough Historical Society in 1970.

It was listed on the National Register of Historic Places in 1971. It is located in the Hillsborough Historic District.

== See also ==
- Alfred Moore Scales Law Office: NRHP listing in Madison, North Carolina
- Brown-Cowles House and Cowles Law Office: NRHP listing in Wilkesboro, North Carolina
- Thomas B. Finley Law Office: NRHP listing in Wilkesboro, North Carolina
- Archibald Henderson Law Office: NRHP listing in Salisbury, North Carolina
- Zollicoffer's Law Office: NRHP listing in Henderson, North Carolina
- National Register of Historic Places listings in Orange County, North Carolina
