= Thomas B. Finley House =

Historic house in North Carolina, United States

- U.S. National Register of Historic Places
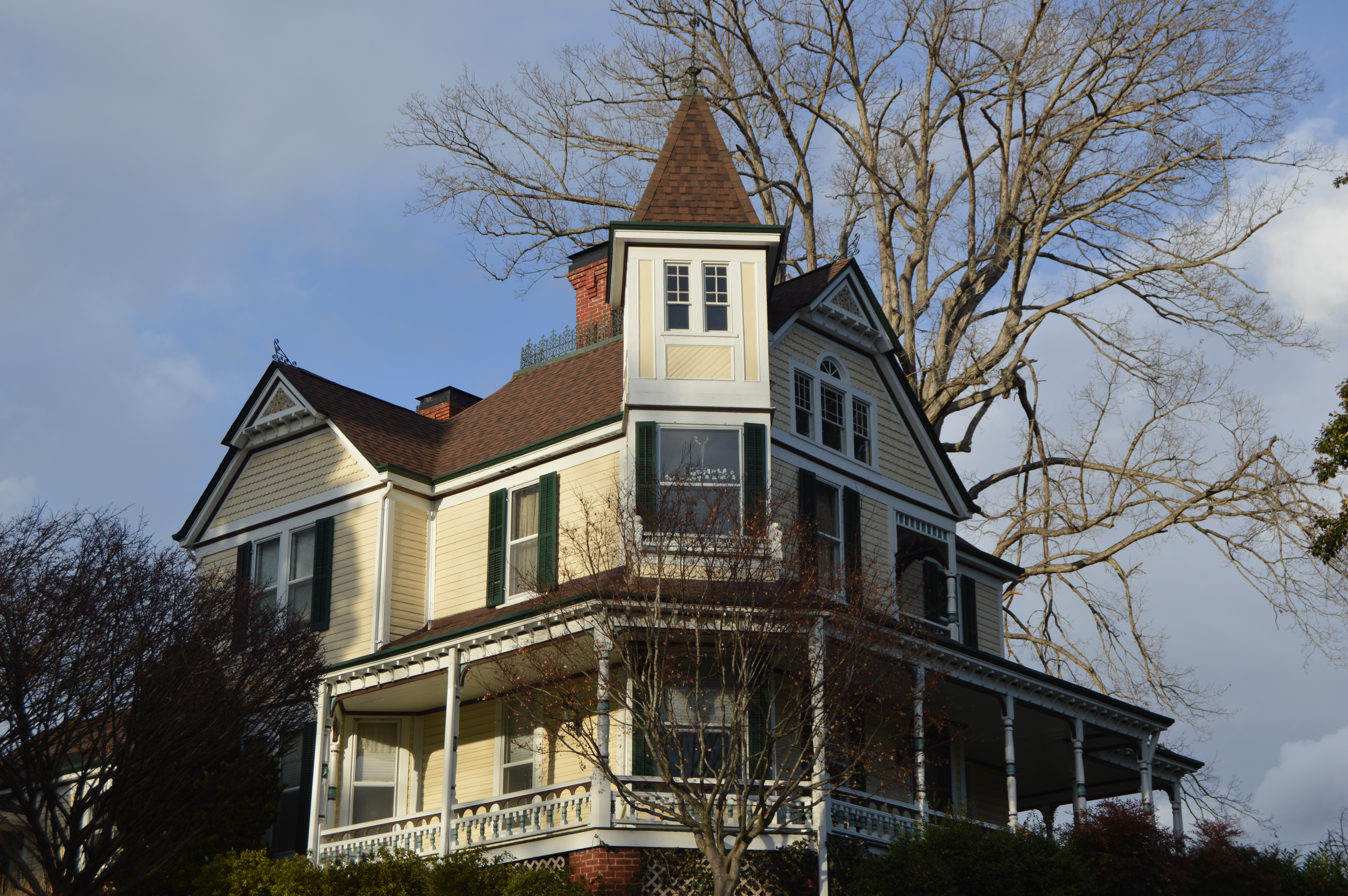
- Front and western side

- Location within North Carolina Location within the United States
- Location: 1014 E St., North Wilkesboro, North Carolina
- Coordinates: 36°9′41″N 81°9′4″W
- Area: less than one acre
- Built: 1893
- Architect: Norma Bonniwell
- Architectural style: Queen Anne
- NRHP reference No.: 08000415
- Added to NRHP: May 15, 2008

The Thomas B. Finley House, also known as The Oaks, is a historic home located at North Wilkesboro, Wilkes County, North Carolina. It was designed by architect Norma Bonniwell (1877–1961) and built in 1893. It is a two-story, Queen Anne style frame dwelling with a one-story rear ell. It features a hip and gable roof, corner tower, fish-scale-cut wood shingles, and one-story, hip-roofed, wraparound porch. It was built for prominent attorney Thomas B. Finley (1862–1942), whose firm Finley and Hendren occupied the Thomas B. Finley Law Office at Wilkesboro.

It was listed on the National Register of Historic Places in 2008.
