= Federal Building (Wilkesboro, North Carolina) =

Historic building in North Carolina, US

- U.S. National Register of Historic Places
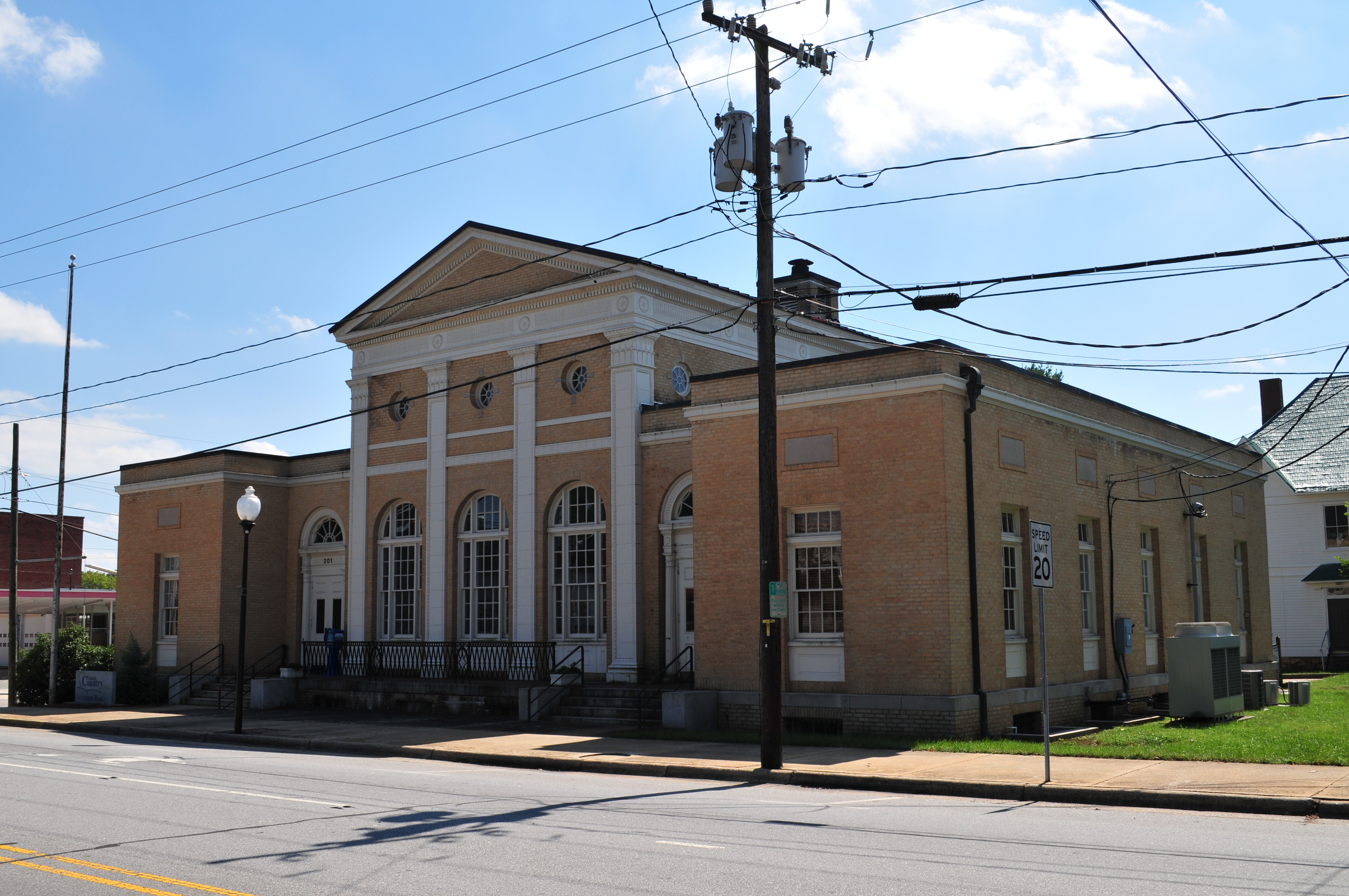
- Federal Building, September 2013

- Location within North Carolina Location within the United States
- Location: 201 W. Main St., Wilkesboro, North Carolina
- Coordinates: 36°8′50″N 81°21′15″W
- Area: less than one acre
- Built: 1915
- Architect: Office of the Supervising Architect under James A. Wetmore.
- Architectural style: Colonial Revival, Federal Revival
- MPS: Wilkesboro MRA
- NRHP reference No.: 82003523
- Added to NRHP: August 24, 1982

Federal Building, also known as the Wilkes County Board of Education Building, is a historic government building located at Wilkesboro, Wilkes County, North Carolina. It was designed by the Office of the Supervising Architect under James A. Wetmore and built in 1915. It is a five-part brick building in the Federal Revival style. It consists of a two-story, three-bay central section, flanked by one-story entrances, which are in turn flanked by one-story wings. The post office was located in the west wing. The building features terra cotta decorative elements.

It was listed on the National Register of Historic Places in 1982.
