= Traphill, North Carolina =

Community in North Carolina, United States

Coordinates: 36.345146°N 81.025741°W

Traphill is name of a rural community located in northeastern Wilkes County, North Carolina. The community is located in the foothills of the Blue Ridge Mountains. Traphill is listed as a ZIP Code Tabulation Area (ZCTA) by the U.S. Census Bureau. According to the 2000 census, the population of Traphill was 1,936. Stone Mountain State Park, one of the most popular state parks in North Carolina, is located in Traphill. The ZIP Code for Traphill is 28685.

== History ==
=== Trap Hill ===
Joining other settlers on the northern edge of Wilkes County in 1775, William Blackburn settled in the present day area of Stone Mountain State Park. Blackburn devised an innovative rail-pen wild turkey trap. These traps and their eventual popularity are commonly recalled as the source of the town's name, although others have varied accounts. Many of the earliest settlers in the region settled along the headwaters of the Roaring River.

=== Chang and Eng Bunker ===
In 1839 Chang and Eng Bunker, the world-famous Siamese twins who were a popular attraction in Europe, Asia, and North America, settled in the Traphill community. The Twins purchased a 110-acre (45 ha) farm, where they lived until 1849. They married two local sisters, Chang to Adelaide Yates and Eng to Sarah Ann Yates. Chang and Adelaide had ten children; Eng and Sarah had twelve.

=== Traphill during the Civil War ===
During the American Civil War the citizens of Traphill were opposed to secession and gained a reputation as pro-Union sympathizers during the conflict. A Traphill resident, John Quincy Adams Bryan, helped recruit local men into the Union Army. In August 1863, a militia of pro-Union Traphill citizens marched into Wilkesboro and, during a pro-Union rally, defiantly raised a Union flag in front of the county courthouse. Traphill's anti-Confederate, pro-Union reputation led deserters, outlaws and refugees to move into the region. Traphill residents frequently helped Confederate deserters and escaped Union POWs evade Confederate and Home Guard forces.

=== 20th century into present ===
During the Prohibition era of the 1920s and 1930s Traphill became a center of the mass production and exportation of illegal homemade liquor, or moonshine. Moonshine became the main source of income for many Traphill families, and until the 1980s, the town continued producing over a million gallons of white liquor each year. Traphill residents made sugar and grain liquor for sale and fruit "brandy" for personal consumption, and continue to do so, with apple and peach brandies being the most common. From the 1920s to the 1960s Federal tax agents, state police units, and local police all patrolled the hills and hollows looking for moonshine stills.

During the Prohibition era Traphill became known for violence and gunplay between the moonshiners and law-enforcement officials. The ridge along the east prong of the Roaring River in Traphill earned the nickname "cutthroat ridge" after consistent disputes between distillers and lawmen. Liquor production became such a common practice, competition became "cutthroat." After a Traphill resident killed a Deputy Sheriff in 1932, <Wilkes Journal Patriot> it was said that the "law wouldn't have nuthin' to do with Traphill." However, as liquor was legalized and tourism became a major source of income for local residents the amount of violence sharply declined later in the 20th century.

Today Traphill is mostly a quiet farming community known for its superb mountain scenery. Stone Mountain State Park, one of North Carolina's most popular state parks, is located in Traphill; the park's presence has led to many out-of-state residents (especially from Florida) building summer homes in the area.

The Holbrook Farm and Traphill Historic District are listed on the National Register of Historic Places.
