= J. T. Ferguson Store =

Historic building in North Carolina, US

- U.S. National Register of Historic Places
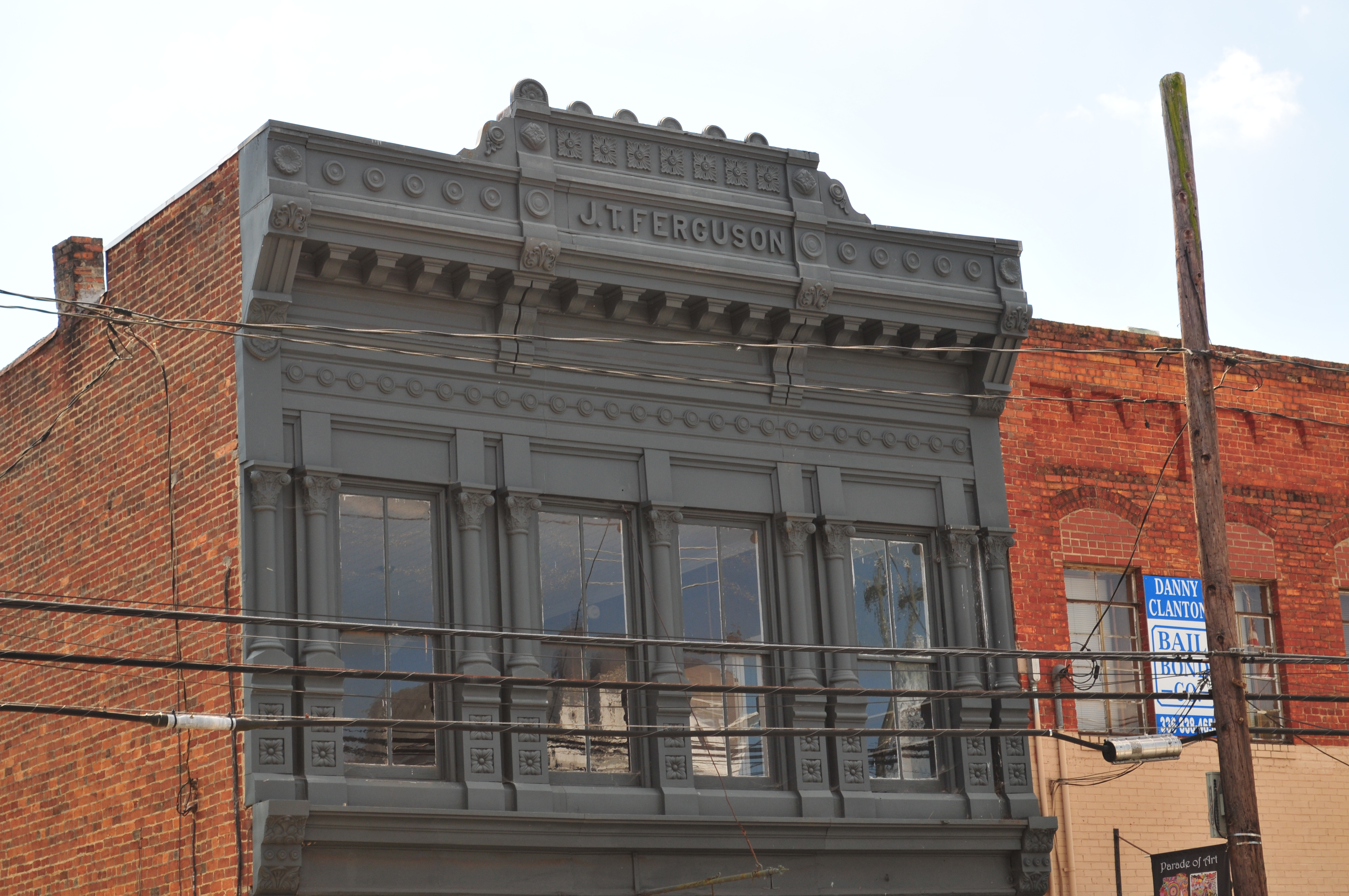
- J. T. Ferguson Store, September 2013

- Location within North Carolina Location within the United States
- Location: 11 E. Main St., Wilkesboro, North Carolina
- Coordinates: 36°8′53″N 81°9′4″W
- Area: less than one acre
- Built: 1887
- Built by: Mesker Bros. Front Builders
- Architectural style: Classical Revival, Late Victorian
- MPS: Wilkesboro MRA
- NRHP reference No.: 82003524
- Added to NRHP: August 24, 1982

J. T. Ferguson Store, also known as the Ferguson Store or Parker Electric Co., is a historic commercial building located at Wilkesboro, Wilkes County, North Carolina. It was built in 1887, and is a two-story brick building with a distinctive pressed metal facade. The facade features a combination of classical and late Victorian details.

It was listed on the National Register of Historic Places in 1982.
