= Downtown Wilkesboro Historic District =

Historic district in North Carolina, United States

- U.S. National Register of Historic Places
- U.S. Historic district
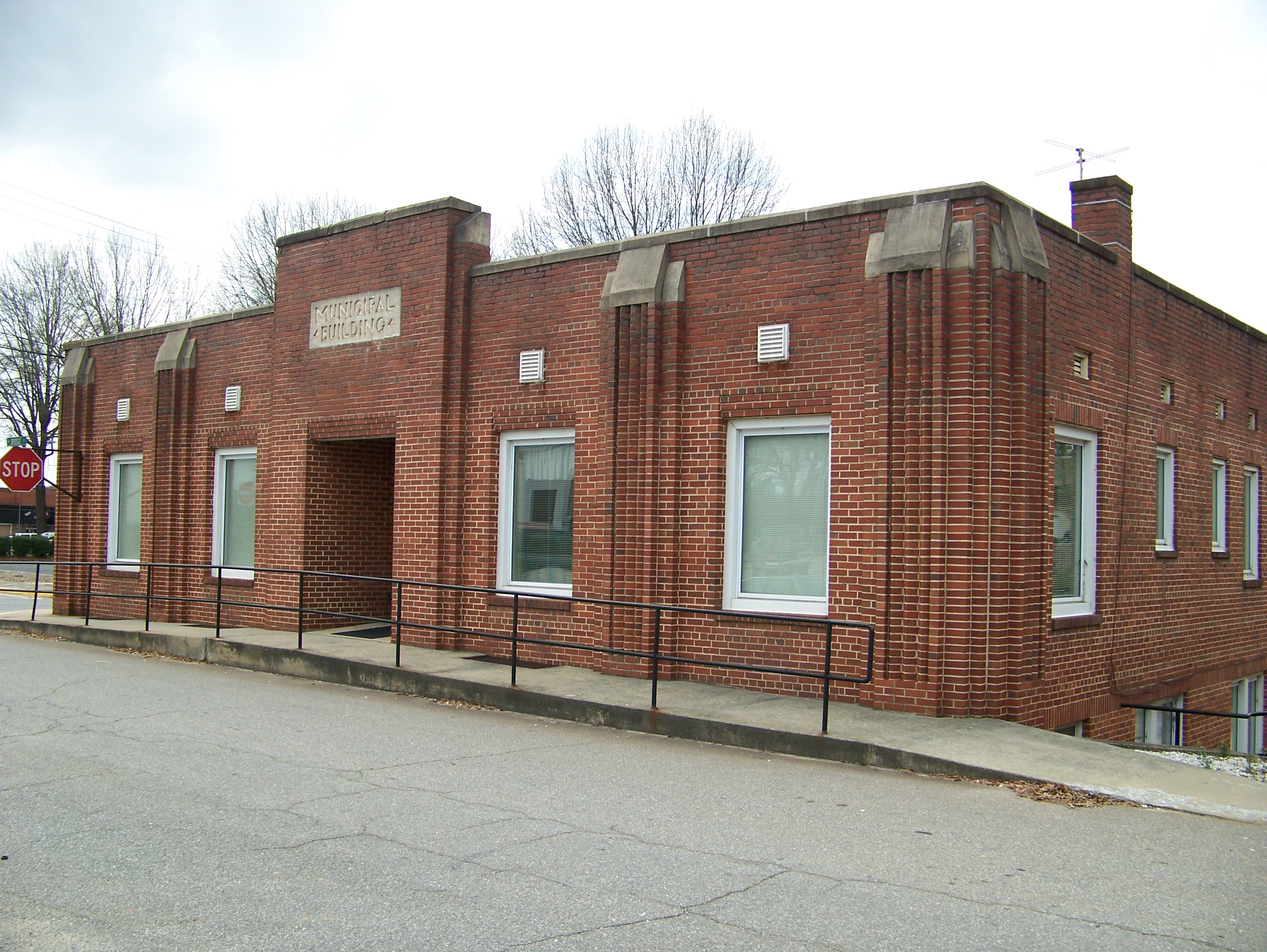
- Old Wilkesboro Municipal Building, 2012

- Location within North Carolina Location within the United States
- Location: Bounded roughly by Cowles and Corporation Sts., Henderson Dr., and Woodland Blvd., Wilkesboro, North Carolina
- Coordinates: 36°8′54″N 81°9′2″W
- Area: 37 acres (15 ha)
- Built: 1835
- Architect: Wheeler & Runge; McMichael and Co.; others
- Architectural style: Queen Anne, Colonial Revival, Bungalow/Craftsman
- MPS: Wilkesboro MRA
- NRHP reference No.: 09000290
- Added to NRHP: April 30, 2009

The Downtown Wilkesboro Historic District in Wilkesboro, North Carolina is a 37-acre (15 ha) historic district that was listed on the National Register of Historic Places in 2009. It included 69 contributing buildings, two contributing sites and one contributing object. It includes architecture by Wheeler, McMichael and Co.

The district includes the Wilkes County Courthouse, a 1902 Beaux-Arts/Classical Revival style building by Charlotte-based architects Wheeler & Runge. The building is large, brick and has a "tetrastyle Ionic portico and Second Empire cupola dominates the Courthouse Square and its surroundings and serves as a major landmark in the town as well as in Wilkes County."

== Gallery ==
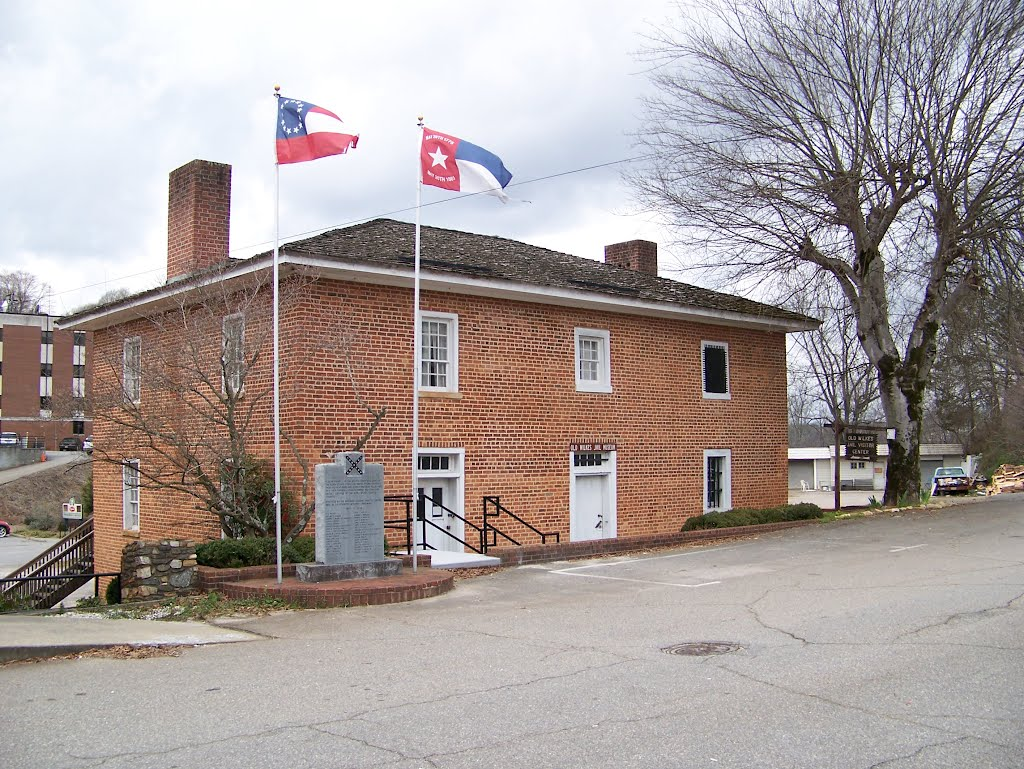
Old Wilkes County Jail, 2012

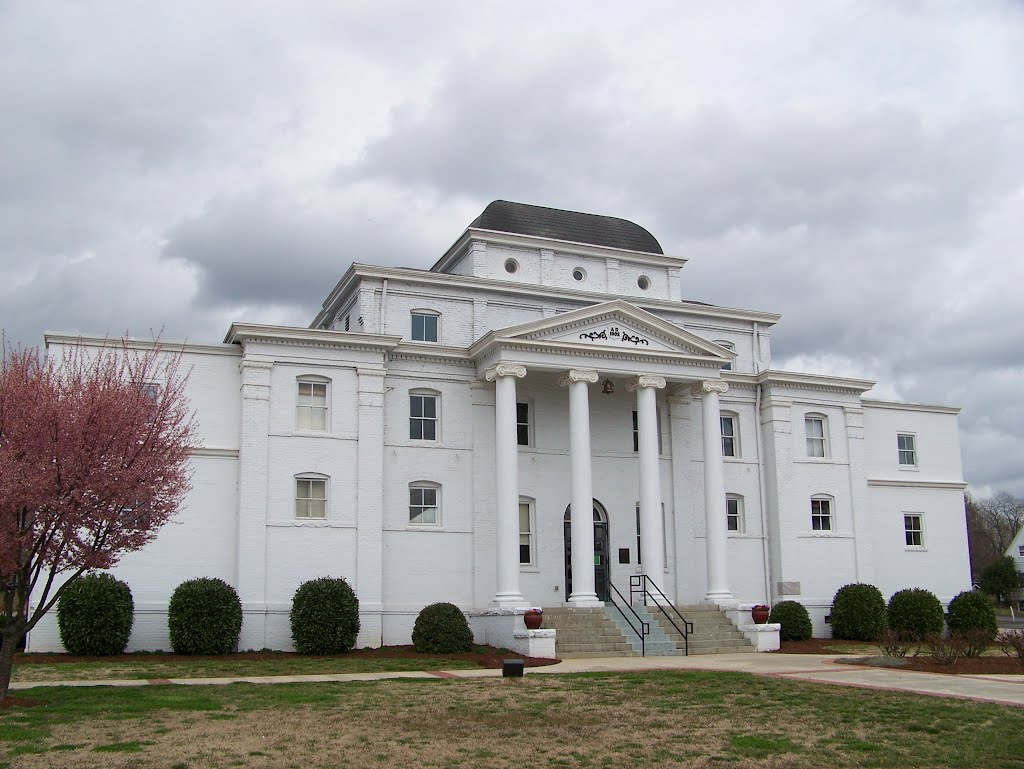
Wilkes County Courthouse, 2012
