= Robert Cleveland Log House =

Historic house in North Carolina, United States

- U.S. National Register of Historic Places
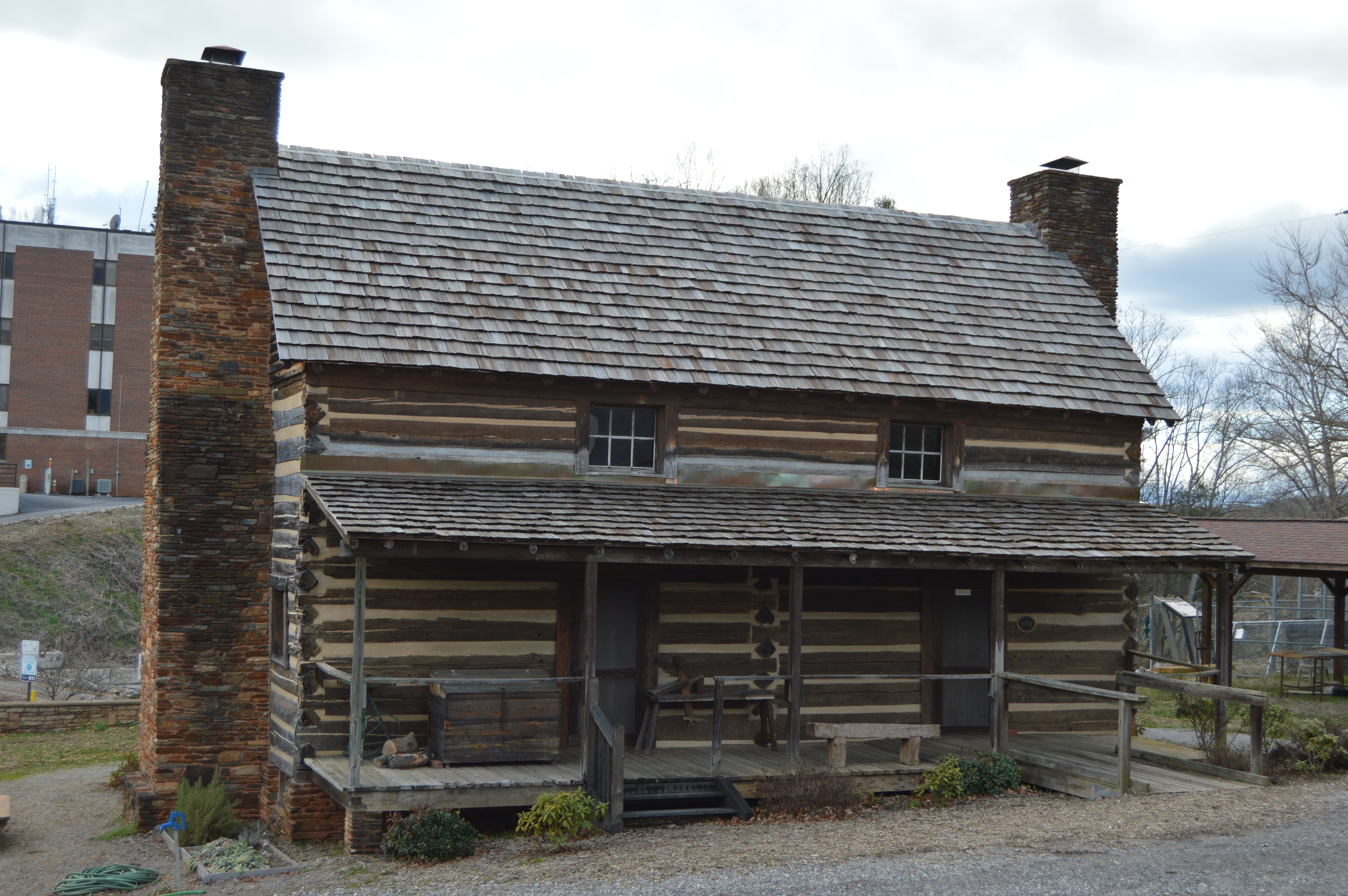
- Front of the house

- Location within North Carolina Location within the United States
- Location: 100 E Main St, Wilkesboro, North Carolina
- Coordinates: 36°8′58.5″N 81°9′9.5″W
- Area: 2 acres (0.81 ha)
- Built: 1780
- Architectural style: Two-Pen Style
- NRHP reference No.: 72001003
- Added to NRHP: February 1, 1972

Robert Cleveland Log House is a historic home located at the Wilkes Heritage Museum in Wilkesboro, Wilkes County, North Carolina. It was originally located east of Purlear near junction of SR 1300 and 1317 and moved to its present location in 1986. It was built about 1780 and is a large two-pen log dwelling with exterior end stone chimneys and an uncoursed stone basement. It was built by Revolutionary War veteran Captain Robert Cleveland, brother of Colonel Benjamin Cleveland, and is probably the oldest dwelling in Wilkes County.

It was listed on the National Register of Historic Places in 1972.

== See also ==
- Robert Cleveland
