= Wilkesboro-Smithey Hotel =

Historic building in North Carolina, US

- U.S. National Register of Historic Places
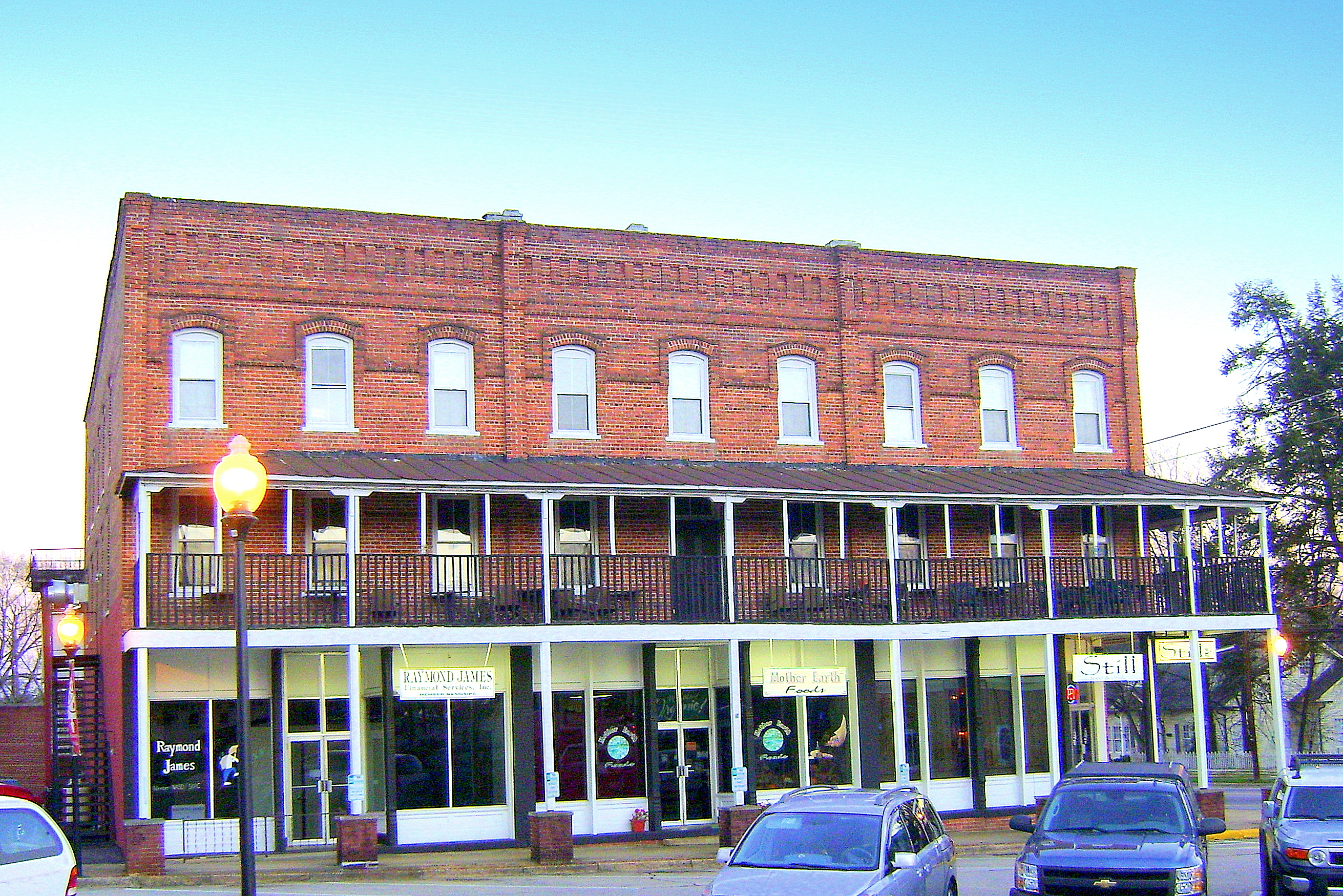
- Wilkesboro-Smithey Hotel, November 2010

- Location within North Carolina Location within the United States
- Location: Broad and E. Main Sts., Wilkesboro, North Carolina
- Coordinates: 36°8′55″N 81°9′4″W
- Area: less than one acre
- Built: 1891
- Built by: Mesker Bros. Front Builders
- MPS: Wilkesboro MRA
- NRHP reference No.: 82003529
- Added to NRHP: August 24, 1982

Wilkesboro-Smithey Hotel, also known as the Smithey Hotel or Smithey's Department Store, is a historic hotel building located at Wilkesboro, Wilkes County, North Carolina. It was built in 1891, and is a three-story, nine bay by six bay, brick building. It features a two-story wraparound gallery porch.

It was listed on the National Register of Historic Places in 1982.
