= Trap Hill, West Virginia =

Trap Hill
- Unincorporated community
- Location within the state of West Virginia Trap Hill (the United States)
- Coordinates: 37°46′58″N 81°20′36″W
- Country: United States
- State: West Virginia
- County: Raleigh
- Elevation: 1,972 ft (601 m)
- Time zone: UTC-5 (Eastern (EST))
  - Summer (DST): UTC-4 (EDT)
- ZIP codes: 28585
- Area code: 25844
- GNIS ID: 1558397

Trap Hill is an unincorporated community in Raleigh County, West Virginia, United States.

== Schools ==
Trap Hill Middle school and Liberty High school.
