= Traphill Historic District =

Historic district in North Carolina, United States

- U.S. National Register of Historic Places
- U.S. Historic district
- Location within North Carolina Location within the United States
- Location: SR 1002 and SR 1749, Traphill, North Carolina
- Coordinates: 36°20′48″N 81°1′26″W
- Area: 70 acres (28 ha)
- Built: 1847
- NRHP reference No.: 80002905
- Added to NRHP: May 22, 1980

The Traphill Historic District is a national historic district located at Traphill, Wilkes County, North Carolina. It encompasses 11 contributing buildings in the village of Traphill. The buildings largely date to the late-19th century and include the Joseph Bryan House (1847), Old Storehouse (c. 1850–1870), Tenant House and Barn, White-Hinson House (1882), Traphill Bargain House, Traphill Baptist Church (1887), Traphill Institute (1891), C. D. Holbrook House (c. 1905), C. D. Holbrook Store, and Traphill Methodist Church (1921).

It was listed on the National Register of Historic Places in 1980.
