= Wilkes County Courthouse (North Carolina) =

- U.S. National Register of Historic Places
- U.S. Historic district – Contributing property
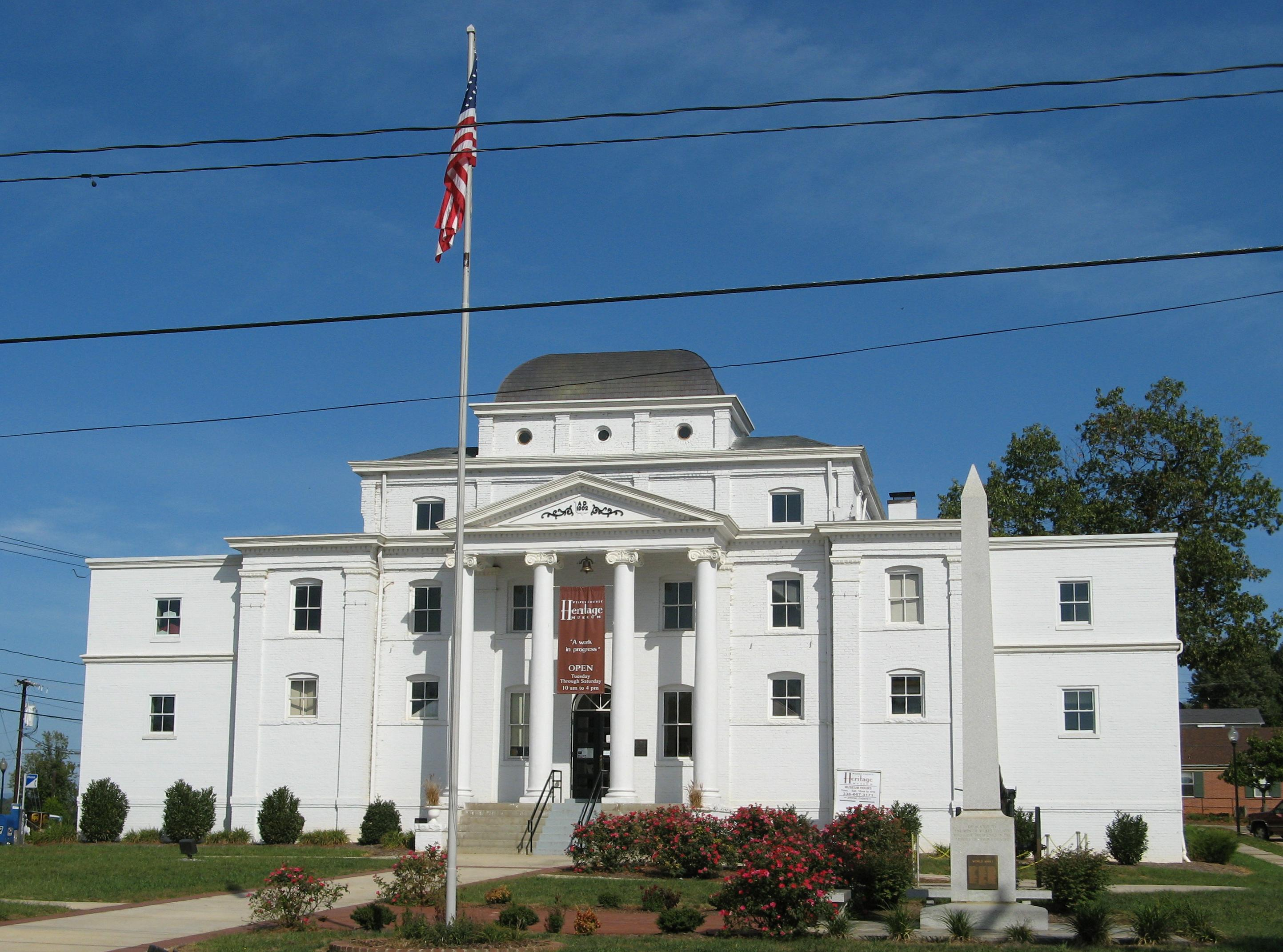

- Location within North Carolina Location within the United States
- Location: E. Main St. between Bridge and Broad Sts., Wilkesboro, North Carolina
- Coordinates: 36°8′55″N 81°9′7″W
- Area: Less than one acre
- Built: 1903
- Architect: Wheeler & Runge; Cooper, L.W., & Co.
- Architectural style: Classical Revival, Beaux Arts
- MPS: North Carolina County Courthouses TR
- NRHP reference No.: 79001764
- Added to NRHP: May 10, 1979

The Wilkes County Courthouse in Wilkesboro, North Carolina was designed by Wheeler, Runge & Dickey in Classical Revival and Beaux Arts style. It was built in 1903.

It was listed on the National Register of Historic Places in 1979. The listing included three contributing buildings on 3.1 acres (1.3 ha). It is located in the Downtown Wilkesboro Historic District.

== Wilkes Heritage Museum ==
The Wilkes Heritage Museum is now housed in the historic courthouse. Opened in 2005, the museum's exhibits include early settlement, military history, industry, agriculture, medicine, communication, education, pottery, entertainment and transportation. The museum also maintains and operates tours of the Old Wilkes County Jail (c. 1859) and the Robert Cleveland Log House (c. 1779), as well as the Blue Ridge Music Hall of Fame. The museum also owns the Thomas B. Finley Law Office.
