= Johnson-Hubbard House =

Historic house in North Carolina, United States

- U.S. National Register of Historic Places
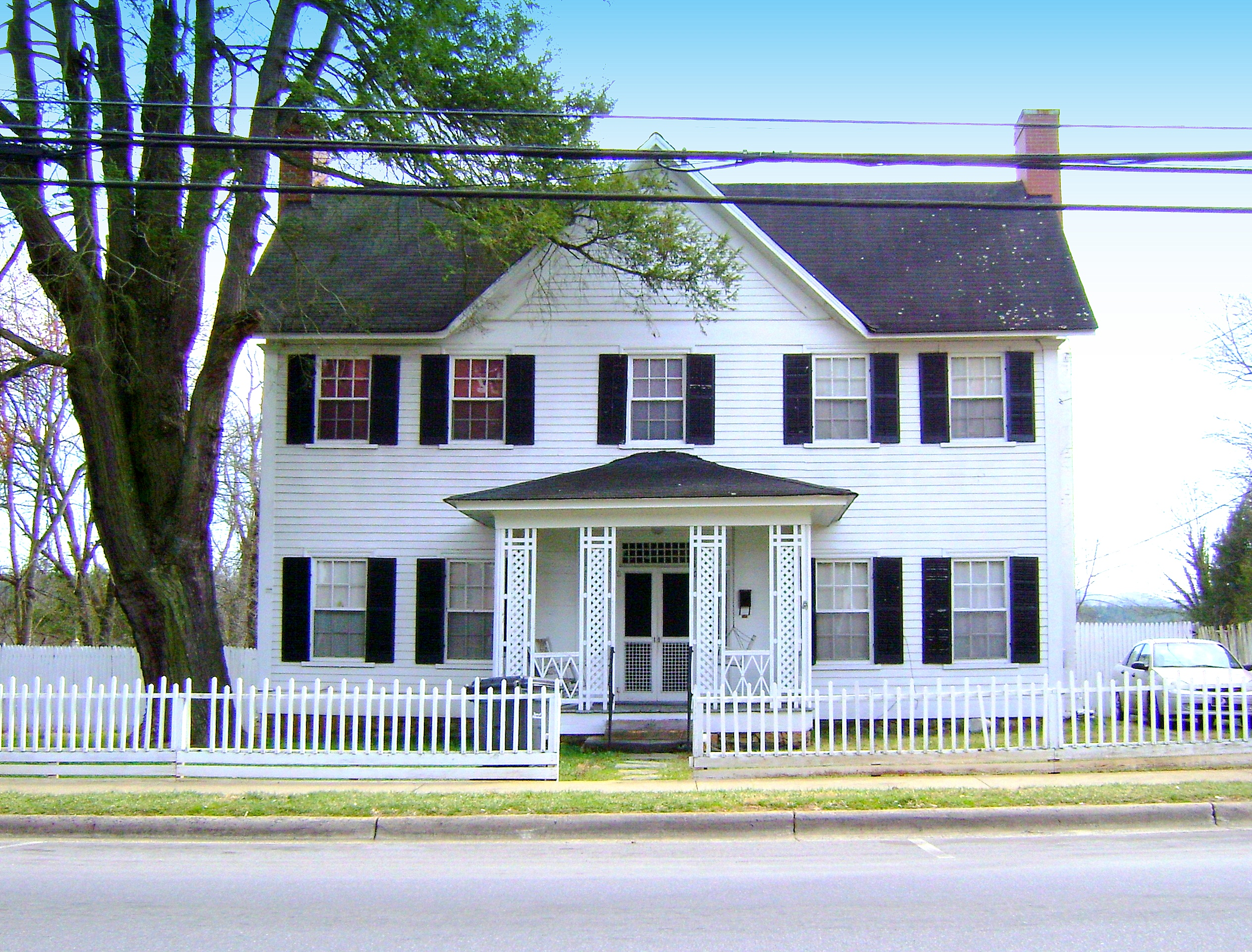
- Johnson-Hubbard House, March 2009

- Location within North Carolina Location within the United States
- Location: 113 E. Main St., Wilkesboro, North Carolina
- Coordinates: 36°8′54″N 81°9′3″W
- Area: less than one acre
- Built: 1855-1857, 1885
- Architectural style: Greek Revival
- MPS: Wilkesboro MRA
- NRHP reference No.: 82003527
- Added to NRHP: August 24, 1982

Johnson-Hubbard House is a historic home located at Wilkesboro, Wilkes County, North Carolina. It was built between about 1855 and 1857, and is a two-story, five-bay, vernacular Greek Revival style frame dwelling with a one-story rear ell. It features brick end chimneys with single paved shoulders and stuccoed surfaces penciled to resemble cut stone.

It was listed on the National Register of Historic Places in 1982.
