= WKBC (AM) =

Coordinates: 36°11′16″N 81°08′30″W

- North Wilkesboro, North Carolina; United States
- Broadcast area: Wilkesboro, North Carolina
- Frequency: 800 kHz
- Branding: AM 800 WKBC

Programming
- Format: Classic country

Ownership
- Owner: Wilkes Broadcasting Company; (Wilkes Broadcasting Company, Inc.)
- Sister stations: WKBC-FM

History
- First air date: June 27, 1947
- Call sign meaning: Wilkes Broadcasting Company

Technical information
- Licensing authority: FCC
- Class: B
- Power: 1,000 watts day 308 watts night
- Translator: 92.7 W224DZ (North Wilkesboro)

Links
- Public license information: Public file; LMS

WKBC (800 kHz) is an AM radio station in North Wilkesboro, North Carolina, United States. WKBC is licensed to broadcast with 1,000 watts in the daytime and 308 watts at night. The station is owned by Wilkes Broadcasting Company, Inc.

== Programming ==
WKBC plays American Country music.

WKBC's morning show is hosted by Steve Handy. Local News is broadcast by long time news personality Ed Racey who is the stations longest tenured employee dating back to the 1960s.

In 2021 WKBC-AM began simulcasting its AM signal on 92.7FM through a translator playing its Country music format mixing "Todays Country and All Time Favorites".

Eric Ellis, a regular on "Hometown Opry", was inducted into the Blue Ridge Music Hall of Fame in January 2009.

== History ==
WKBC began broadcasting at 5 a.m. June 27, 1947, owned and operated by the Wilkes Broadcasting Company. Besides local programming, it used the World Broadcasting System transcription service.

As of December 2024 WKBC plays classic country.
