= Holbrook Farm (Traphill, North Carolina) =

Historic farm in North Carolina, United States

- U.S. National Register of Historic Places
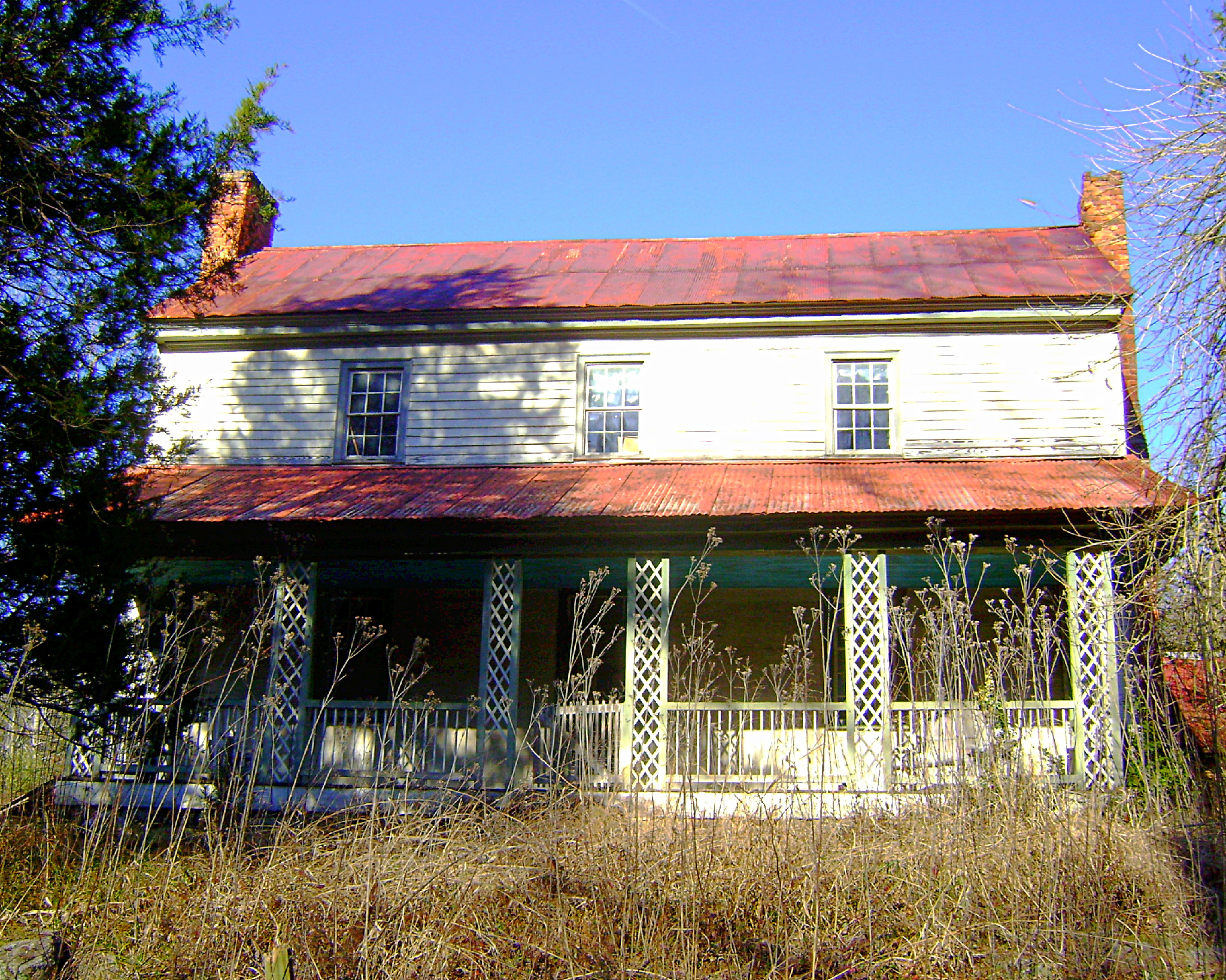
- Holbrook Farm House, September 2012

- Location within North Carolina Location within the United States
- Location: W of Traphill on SR 1743, near Traphill, North Carolina
- Coordinates: 36°20′35″N 81°3′26″W
- Area: 25 acres (10 ha)
- Built: 1826
- Architectural style: Federal
- NRHP reference No.: 78001985
- Added to NRHP: November 29, 1978

Holbrook Farm is a historic farm complex located near Traphill, Wilkes County, North Carolina. The house was built about 1826, and is a vernacular two story, three bay frame dwelling with Federal style design elements. Also on the property are the contributing log granary, log spring house, a log smokehouse, a log corn crib, a frame barn, and a board-and-batten two-room school dormitory that once served the Trap Hill Institute and moved to the property in the early-20th century.

It was listed on the National Register of Historic Places in 1978.
