= Elkin Creek Mill =

- U.S. National Register of Historic Places
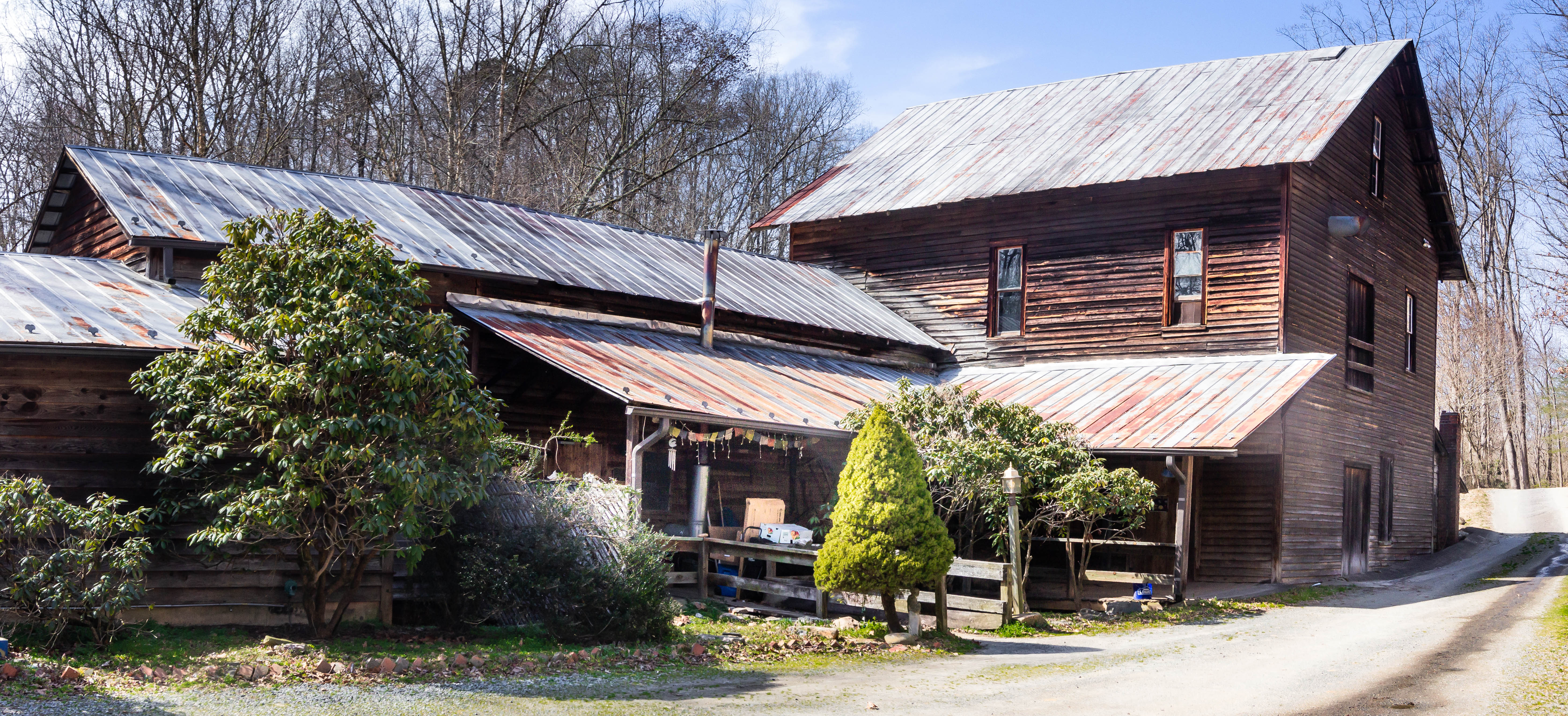

- Location within North Carolina Location within the United States
- Location: SR 2045, near West Elkin, North Carolina
- Coordinates: 36°16′40″N 80°52′29″W
- Area: 2.5 acres (1.0 ha)
- Built: c. 1896
- NRHP reference No.: 82003521
- Added to NRHP: April 29, 1982

Elkin Creek Mill is a historic grist mill located near West Elkin, Wilkes County, North Carolina. It was built about 1896, and is a two-story, rectangular frame structure on fieldstone piers. It has a one-story gable roofed wing and one-story shed addition. The milling equipment remains in place in the building. Also on the property is a contributing four stall stable.

It was listed on the National Register of Historic Places in 1982.
