= WKBC-FM =

- North Wilkesboro, North Carolina; United States
- Broadcast area: North Wilkesboro Micropolitan Area
- Frequency: 97.3 MHz
- Branding: 97.3 WKBC, The Mix

Programming
- Language: English
- Format: Adult contemporary
- Affiliations: Appalachian ISP Sports Network; CBS News Radio; Westwood One

Ownership
- Owner: Wilkes Broadcasting Company; (Wilkes Broadcasting Company, Inc.)
- Sister stations: WKBC (AM)

History
- First air date: July 1962
- Call sign meaning: Wilkes Broadcasting Company

Technical information
- Licensing authority: FCC
- Facility ID: 72458
- Class: C
- ERP: 100,000 watts
- HAAT: 403 meters (1,322 ft)
- Transmitter coordinates: 36°4′34.00″N 81°7′43.00″W

Links
- Public license information: Public file; LMS

WKBC-FM (97.3 MHz) is a commercial radio station licensed to North Wilkesboro, North Carolina broadcasting an adult contemporary format known as "97.3 WKBC, The Mix".

Due to its tower being located 1,300 feet (400 meters) above the surrounding terrain, the station can be heard as far south as Charlotte (providing city-grade coverage of the city's northern suburbs) and as far east as Winston-Salem when it starts to interfere with WQMG of Greensboro. The signal carries into the north-most portions of South Carolina including: York, Cherokee and Lancaster counties. It can also be heard clearly in parts of southwestern Virginia.

The transmitter is located about 5 miles south of North Wilkesboro atop a peak in the Brushy Mountains of southern Wilkes County.

WKBC-FM's slogan is the "Home of Appalachian Football". The station is the radio flagship of nearby Appalachian State University's sports network.

In 2026, WKBC-FM applied to change its city of license to Stony Point, North Carolina, move its transmitter and reduce its signal, giving it coverage of the Charlotte, North Carolina market.

== Awards ==
WKBC was voted the best radio station in the Charlotte listening area by the music critics of Charlotte's Creative Loafing magazine in 2006.
