= Old Wilkes County Jail =

Museum in North Carolina, US

- U.S. National Register of Historic Places
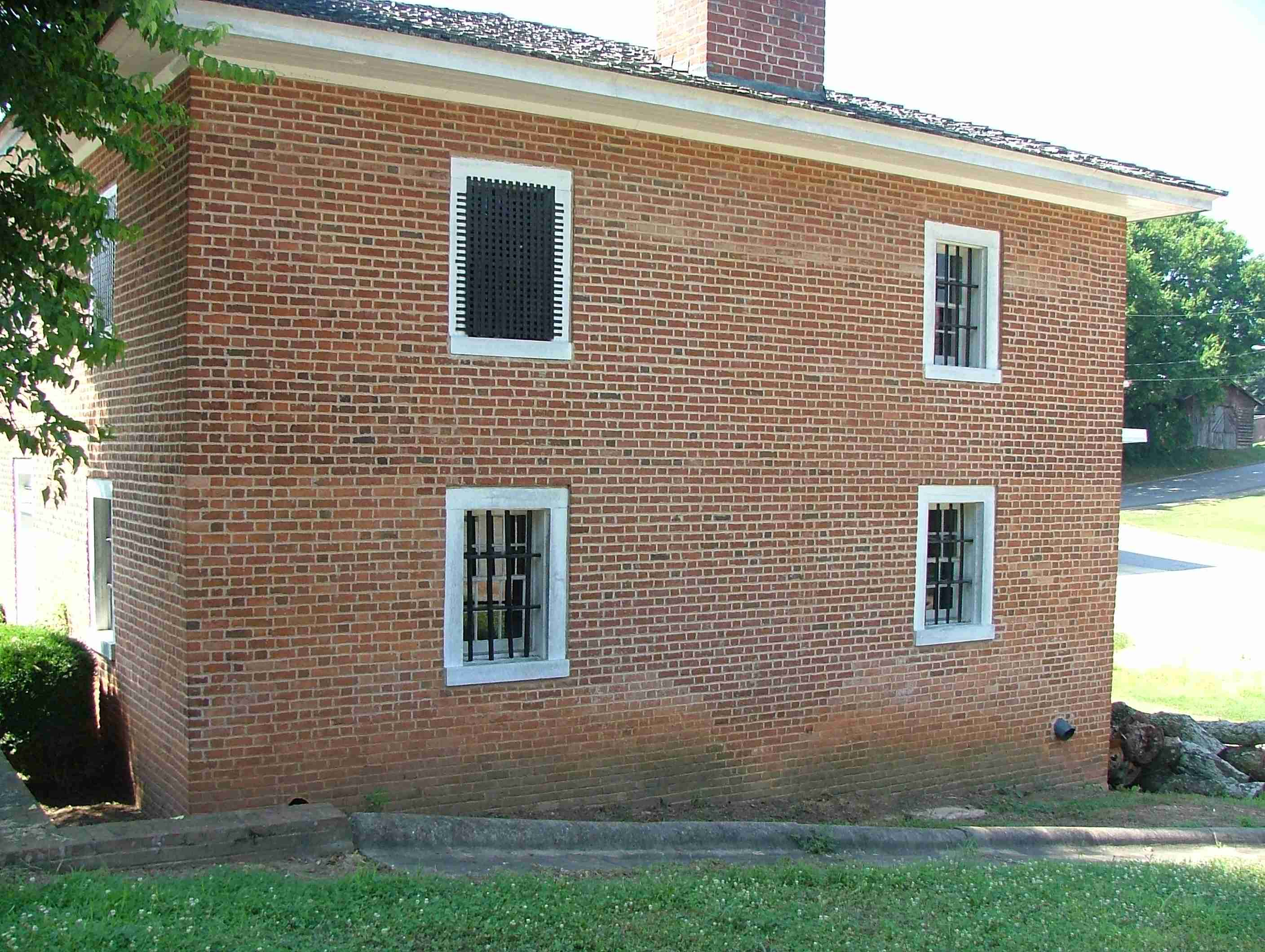
- Old Wilkes County Jail, July 2004

- Location within North Carolina Location within the United States
- Location: N. Bridge St., Wilkesboro, North Carolina
- Coordinates: 36°8′56″N 81°9′9″W
- Area: 0.5 acres (0.20 ha)
- Built: 1858
- NRHP reference No.: 71000628
- Added to NRHP: February 18, 1971

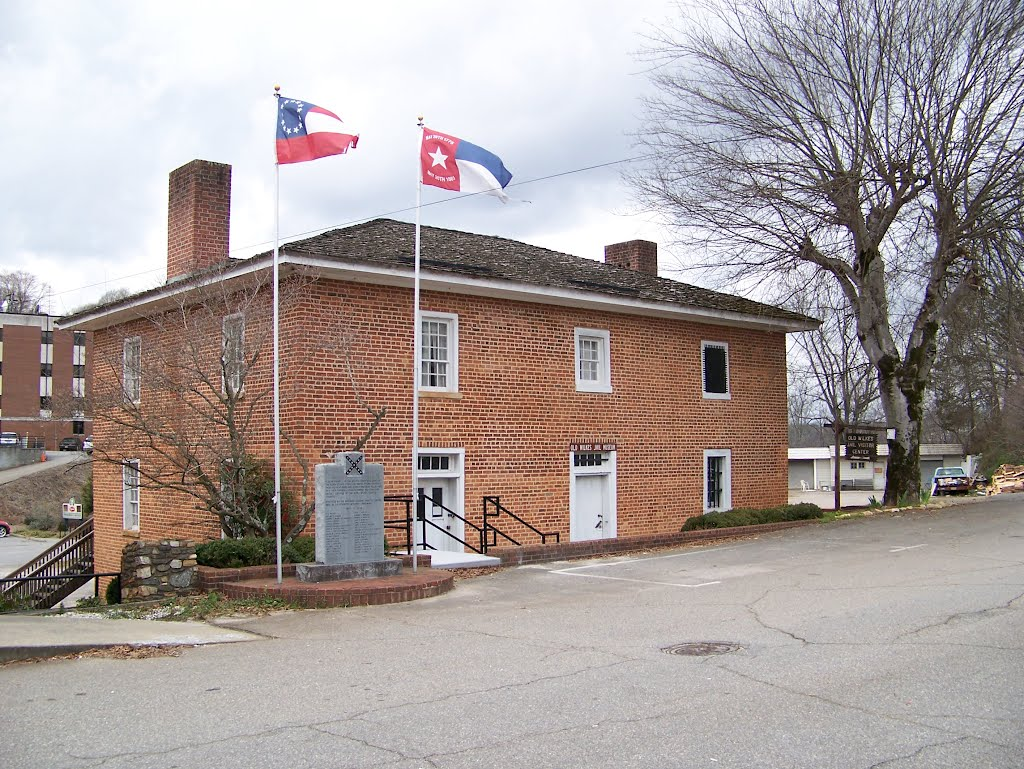
Old Wilkes County Jail, 2012

Old Wilkes County Jail is a historic jail located at the Wilkes Heritage Museum in Wilkesboro, Wilkes County, North Carolina. It was built in 1858, and is a two-story, rectangular brick building with a low hipped roof. The jail retains much of its original hardware including strap hinges and several early locks.

It was listed on the National Register of Historic Places in 1971.
