= Wilkesboro, North Carolina =

Wilkesboro
- Town
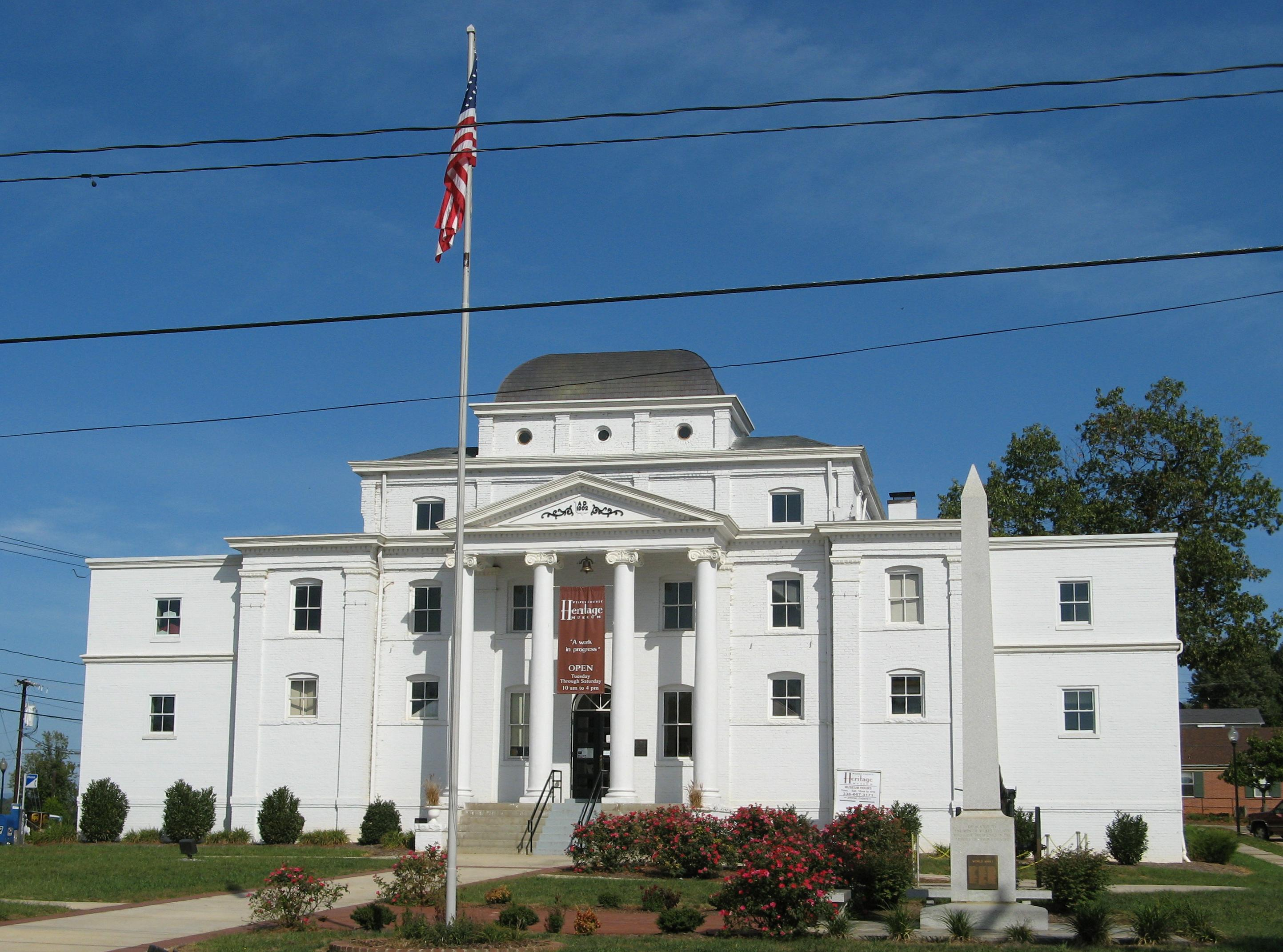
- Former Wilkes County Courthouse, now the Wilkes Heritage Museum

- Flag Seal
- Motto: Where the Mountains Begin
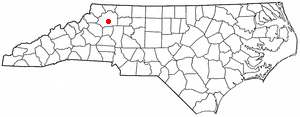
- Location of Wilkesboro, North Carolina
- Coordinates: 36°08′33″N 81°10′30″W
- County: Wilkes
- State: North Carolina
- Country: United States
- Named for: John Wilkes

Government
  - Type: municipal

Area
  - Total: 6.42 sq mi (16.64 km^{2})
  - Land: 6.42 sq mi (16.64 km^{2})
  - Water: 0 sq mi (0.00 km^{2})
- Elevation: 991 ft (302 m)

Population (2020)
  - Total: 3,687
  - Density: 573.7/sq mi (221.52/km^{2})
- Time zone: UTC-5 (Eastern (EST))
  - Summer (DST): UTC-4 (EDT)
- ZIP code: 28697
- Area code: 336
- FIPS code: 37-74020
- GNIS feature ID: 2406886
- Website: wilkesboronc.org

Wilkesboro is a town in and the county seat of Wilkes County, North Carolina, United States. The population was 3,687 at the 2020 census. The town is located along the south bank of the Yadkin River, directly opposite the town of North Wilkesboro.

== History ==
Wilkesboro was founded in 1800 and quickly designated as the county seat.

The town is built atop a low, broad ridge which runs for over a mile along the south bank of the Yadkin River.

For many decades a popular historic spot in Wilkesboro was the "Tory Oak", a large oak tree from which Colonel Benjamin Cleveland, a well-known Wilkes County patriot during the American Revolutionary War, hanged Loyalist militia leaders who supported the British king and opposed American independence from Britain. The oak was located behind the old Wilkes County courthouse.

During the Civil War, many of Wilkesboro's residents remained loyal to the Union and opposed the Confederacy. In March 1865, General George Stoneman, a Union cavalry leader, led a raid through the town.

Shortly after the war ended, Tom Dula (Dooley), a Confederate veteran, was tried and hanged for the murder of his fiancée, Laura Foster. Many people were convinced that one of Dula's jealous ex-girlfriends murdered Foster, and that Dula was innocent of the crime. Dula's story was turned into a top-selling ballad in 1958 by The Kingston Trio, titled "Tom Dooley". The story was subsequently turned into a 1959 movie starring Michael Landon as Dula. Each summer, the Wilkes Playmakers present a popular play based on the story.

The Robert Cleveland Log House, Downtown Wilkesboro Historic District, Federal Building, J. T. Ferguson Store, Thomas B. Finley Law Office, J. L. Hemphill House, Johnson-Hubbard House, Old Wilkes County Jail, St. Paul's Episcopal Church and Cemetery, Wilkes County Courthouse, Wilkesboro Presbyterian Church, and Wilkesboro-Smithey Hotel are listed on the National Register of Historic Places.

== Demographics ==
=== 2020 census ===
Wilkesboro racial composition
Race	Number	Percentage
White (non-Hispanic)	2,725	73.91%
Black or African American (non-Hispanic)	327	8.87%
Native American	6	0.16%
Asian	122	3.31%
Other/mixed	165	4.48%
Hispanic or Latino	342	9.28%

As of the 2020 census, Wilkesboro had a population of 3,687. The median age was 45.5 years. 19.1% of residents were under the age of 18 and 26.7% of residents were 65 years of age or older. For every 100 females there were 88.7 males, and for every 100 females age 18 and over there were 83.6 males age 18 and over.

99.8% of residents lived in urban areas, while 0.2% lived in rural areas.

There were 1,528 households in Wilkesboro, of which 24.6% had children under the age of 18 living in them. Of all households, 35.6% were married-couple households, 18.4% were households with a male householder and no spouse or partner present, and 39.9% were households with a female householder and no spouse or partner present. About 39.6% of all households were made up of individuals and 21.3% had someone living alone who was 65 years of age or older.

There were 1,685 housing units, of which 9.3% were vacant. The homeowner vacancy rate was 1.4% and the rental vacancy rate was 7.2%.

=== 2010 census ===
As of the 2010 census, there were 3,413 people living in Wilkesboro. The population density was 622.5 inhabitants per square mile (240.3/km^{2}). The racial makeup of Wilkesboro was 81.5% White, 8.9% African American, 3.0% Asian, 0.2% Native American, 0.2% Pacific Islander, 4.0% from other races, and 2.3% from two or more races.

The population of Wilkesboro was spread out, with 21.7% being under the age of 20, 6.1% from 20-24, 21.9% from 25-44, 25.6% from 45-64, and 24.5% being 65 and over. The median age was 45.2 years old, more specifically 40.8 for males and 49.5 for females.

Historical population
Census	Pop.	Note	%±
1880	200		—
1890	336		68.0%
1900	634		88.7%
1910	799		26.0%
1920	814		1.9%
1930	1,042		28.0%
1940	1,309		25.6%
1950	1,370		4.7%
1960	1,568		14.5%
1970	2,038		30.0%
1980	2,335		14.6%
1990	2,573		10.2%
2000	3,159		22.8%
2010	3,413		8.0%
2020	3,687		8.0%
U.S. Decennial Census

== Economy ==
Wilkesboro's largest industry is the Tyson Foods poultry processing plant; it is one of the largest poultry plants east of the Mississippi River.

Local communication companies Wilkes Communications and Carolina West Wireless are based in Wilkesboro.

== Education ==
Wilkesboro is served by the Wilkes County Schools system. Most of Wilkesboro's high school students attend Wilkes Central High School; it is located in the adjacent community of Moravian Falls. Wilkes Early College, based at Wilkes Community College, and one charter school, Bridges Charter School in State Road, North Carolina, offer other high-school options to Wilkesboro's students. Middle school students in Wilkesboro attend Central Wilkes Middle School, located in Moravian Falls, while the elementary schools that serve the town are Wilkesboro Elementary, Moravian Falls Elementary, and CC Wright Elementary.

Wilkesboro is the home of Wilkes Community College, a public, coed, two-year college within the North Carolina Community College System. The college's enrollment is typically around 3,500 students.

== Media ==
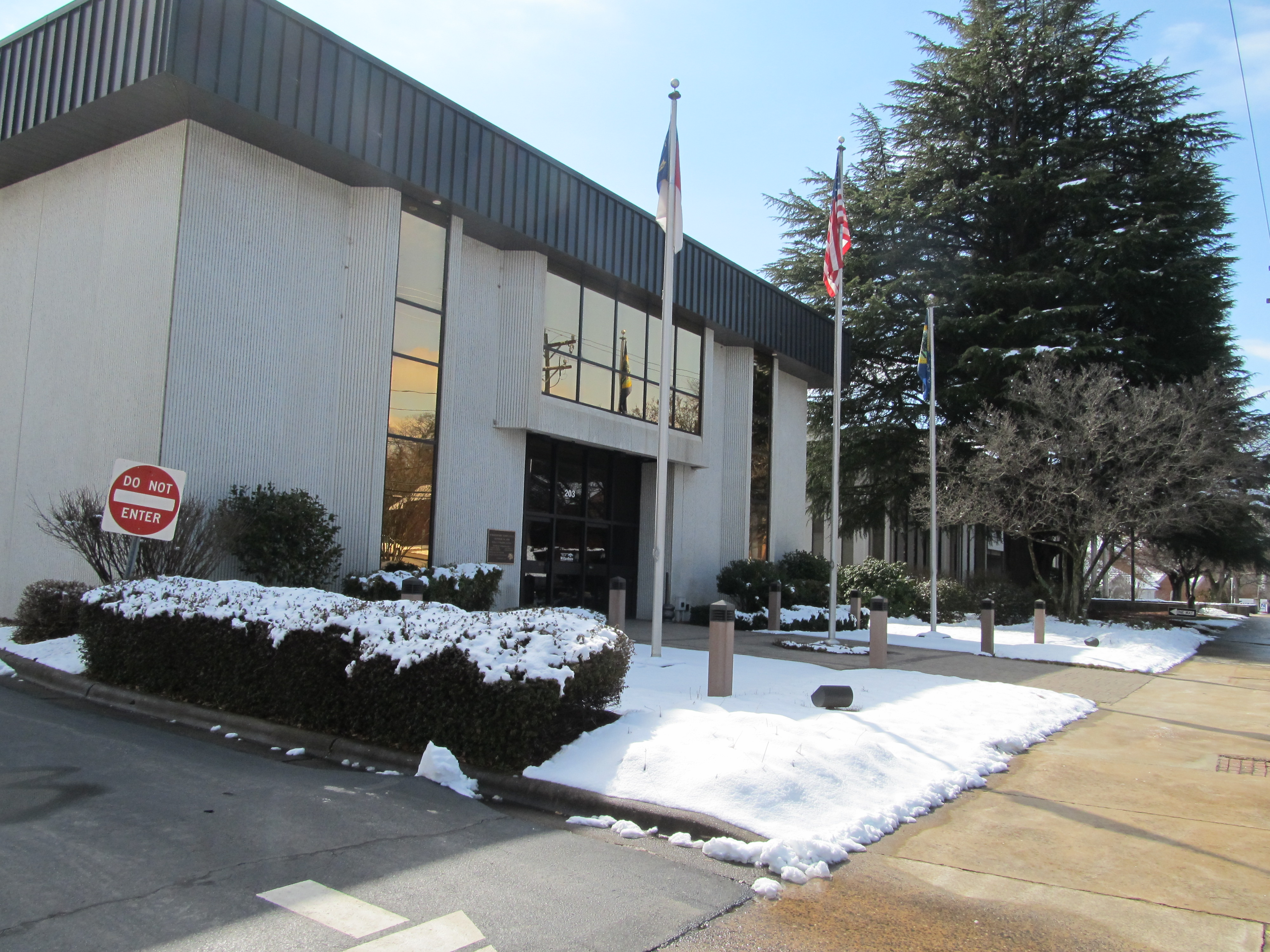
Wilkesboro Town Hall

Wilkesboro is served by a few media sources based in nearby North Wilkesboro. The Record of Wilkes and the Journal-Patriot are published weekly.

Wilkes County's two largest radio stations are broadcast from North Wilkesboro: WKBC-FM (97.3 FM) broadcasts Adult Contemporary (hot AC) and WKBC (AM) (800 AM) broadcasts country music.

== Transportation ==
=== Public transportation ===
WTA, Wilkes Transportation Authority, is a local shuttle service based in Wilkesboro that utilizes vans and buses to serve Wilkes County. Fares range from $2-$24, but are typically around $4. A scheduled shuttle service runs roughly every hour, and an unscheduled service allows riders to request a van pick-up in any part of the county.

=== Intercity bus ===
Daily bus service is available on Greyhound. Sunway buses are advertised as Greyhound Express buses. The bus stop is in front of the former Federal Building at 207 West Main Street. Bus service goes to Boone, NC and Greensboro, NC, known as the Mountaineer East/West line, with prices as low as $4. Passengers can connect to Greyhound services throughout the East Coast via the J. Douglas Galyon Depot, where the line ends.

=== Major highways ===
- US 421 (BUS)
- NC 16
- NC 18
- NC 268

== Politics and religion ==
Like most of Wilkes County, Wilkesboro has long been a bastion of the Republican Party.

Wilkesboro's largest religious group is the Southern Baptists, but the town does contain substantial numbers of Methodists, Presbyterians, Lutherans, and Episcopalians. The first two churches to be established in Wilkes County were built in Wilkesboro; they were missionary churches for the Episcopal and Presbyterian denominations. The nearby town of North Wilkesboro contains Wilkes County's only Roman Catholic church: a parish church named for Saint John Baptist de la Salle, and part of the Roman Catholic Diocese of Charlotte.

== Attractions ==
Wilkesboro is a small town Main Street community and has recently revitalized its historic downtown to include the Carolina West Wireless Community Commons, Wilkes Communications Pavilion, Heritage Square, and Splash Pad.

Cub Creek Park is adjacent to the downtown area and contains many amenities, including baseball; walking and mountain biking trails; trout fishing; dog park; basketball, tennis, and pickleball courts; and picnic shelters.

Wilkesboro is also the home of the annual MerleFest, Carolina in the Fall, and Brushy Mountain Peach & Heritage festivals.

- MerleFest
- W. Kerr Scott Dam and Reservoir
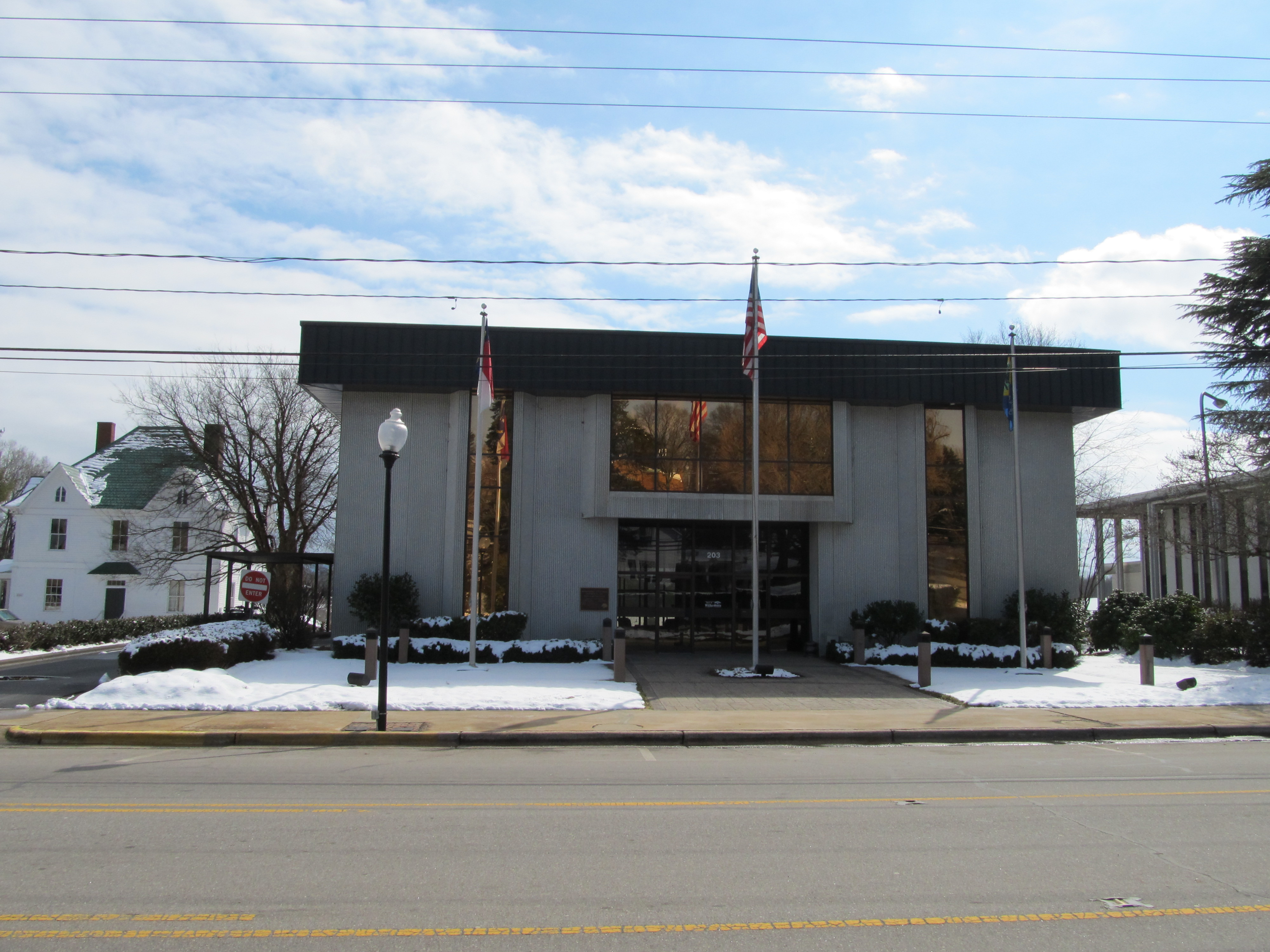
- Wilkesboro Town Hall
  Carolina West Wireless Community Commons
- Wilkes Communications Pavilion
- Heritage Square Splash Pad
- Wilkes Heritage Museum
- Rolling Pines Disc Golf Course
- Wilkesboro Sundial
- Wilkes Community College
- Ben Long Frescoes at St. Paul’s Episcopal Church
- Cub Creek Park and Mountain Biking Trails
- Hidden Oaks Dog Park
- Blue Ridge Artisan Center at the 1915 Building
- Yadkin River Greenway
- North Wilkesboro Speedway

== Notable people ==
- Rhoda Bryan Billings, law professor and jurist, second woman to serve as Chief Justice of the North Carolina Supreme Court
- Chang and Eng Bunker, the original Siamese twins
- Zach Galifianakis, stand-up comedian and character actor
- Deneen Graham, first black woman to be crowned Miss North Carolina, in 1983
- Richard N. Hackett, congressional representative from 1907 to 1909
- Jim Hamby, former MLB player
- Junior Johnson, former NASCAR driver who tallied 50 wins in his career
- Benny Parsons, NASCAR Driver
- Montford Stokes, former United States senator and 25th governor of North Carolina
- Rachel Montgomery Stokes, First Lady of North Carolina, wife of Montford Stokes
