= Wilkes County Schools (North Carolina) =

Public school district serving Wilkes County, North Carolina

Location
- Wilkes County, North Carolina United States

District information
- Type: Public
- Grades: PK–12
- Established: 1975
- Superintendent: Dr. Westley Wood (interim)
- Accreditation: Cognia
- Schools: 22
- NCES District ID: 3704950

Other information
- Website: www.wilkescountyschools.org

Wilkes County Schools is a public school district serving nearly all of Wilkes County, North Carolina. Established in 1975 through the merger of the Wilkes County and North Wilkesboro City school systems, the district operates 22 schools serving students in grades pre-kindergarten through 12.

The district serves communities including Wilkesboro, North Wilkesboro, Hays, Traphill, Millers Creek, Ronda, Roaring River, Moravian Falls, McGrady, and Mulberry. Wilkes County Schools includes four traditional high schools — East Wilkes High School, North Wilkes High School, West Wilkes High School, and Wilkes Central High School — along with Wilkes Early College High School.

Wilkes County Schools is one of the largest employers in Wilkes County and offers academic, career and technical education, arts, athletic, and early college programs throughout the district. Several schools in the district have received state and national recognition for academic achievement and school performance.

Following the death of superintendent Mark Byrd in 2026, Dr. Westley Wood was named interim superintendent of the district.

== History ==
The history of public education in Wilkes County began shortly after North Carolina passed its first common school law in 1839, which established a statewide public school system and divided counties into local school districts.

By the 1930s, Wilkes County operated as many as 151 one- and two-teacher schoolhouses throughout the county. During the mid-20th century, many of these schools were consolidated into larger campuses as transportation infrastructure improved and enrollment patterns changed.

School consolidation efforts, along with racial integration during the 1960s and 1970s, eventually led to the merger of the Wilkes County school system with the North Wilkesboro City Schools. The two systems officially merged on July 1, 1975, forming the modern Wilkes County Schools district.

Since the merger, Wilkes County Schools has expanded its academic, athletic, and career and technical education programs across the county. The district serves students in communities including North Wilkesboro, Wilkesboro, Hays, Millers Creek, Ronda, Traphill, McGrady, Moravian Falls, and Roaring River.

In 2025, longtime superintendent Mark Byrd died while serving in office. Following his death, Wesley Wood was named interim superintendent of Wilkes County Schools.

== Student demographics ==
For the 2010–11 school year, Wilkes County Schools had a total population of 10,374 students and 639.52 teachers on a (FTE) basis. This produced a student-teacher ratio of 16.22:1. That same year, out of the student total, the gender ratio was 51% male to 49% female. The demographic group makeup was: White, 81%; Hispanic, 11%; Black, 4%; American Indian, <1%, and Asian/Pacific Islander, <1%; two or more races: 3%).

== Governance and funding ==
Wilkes County Schools operates under a superintendent–board model of governance. The district is governed by a five-member Board of Education, which appoints a superintendent to oversee the day-to-day operations of the school system. Wilkes County Schools is part of the North Carolina State Board of Education's Seventh Educational District.

=== Board of education ===
The Wilkes County Board of Education consists of five elected members responsible for district governance, budgeting, policy, and long-term planning. As of 2026, board members are Rudy Holbrook (chairman), Joan Caudill, Donna Cotton, Jammie Jolly, and Kirk Walker.

=== Superintendent ===
Mark Byrd served as superintendent of Wilkes County Schools from 2016 until his death in February 2026. Prior to becoming superintendent, Byrd served as assistant superintendent for the district.

Following Byrd's death, Assistant Superintendent Dr. Westley Wood was named acting and later interim superintendent by the Wilkes County Board of Education.

=== Funding ===
Public school districts in North Carolina do not possess independent taxing authority and rely primarily on state appropriations, county funding, and federal assistance programs.

Wilkes County Schools is one of the largest employers in Wilkes County and operates more than 20 schools serving students across the county.

== Member schools ==
The Wilkes County Schools system has 22 schools ranging from pre-kindergarten to twelfth grade, including an early college high school. Those 22 schools are separated into 5 high schools, 4 middle schools and 13 elementary schools.

=== High schools ===
- East Wilkes High School (Cardinals), Ronda
- North Wilkes High School (Vikings), Hays
- West Wilkes High School (Blackhawks), Millers Creek
- Wilkes Central High School (Eagles), Moravian Falls
- Wilkes Early College High School, Wilkesboro

=== Middle schools ===
- Central Wilkes Middle School (Falcons), Moravian Falls
- East Wilkes Middle School (Scorpions), Ronda
- North Wilkes Middle School (Jaguars), Yellow Banks Road between Mulberry and Hays
- West Wilkes Middle School (Knights), Millers Creek

=== Elementary schools ===
- Boomer-Ferguson Elementary School (Bulldogs), Boomer
- C. B. Eller Elementary School (Trojans), Elkin
- C. C. Wright Elementary School (Tigers), North Wilkesboro
- Millers Creek Elementary School (Ravens), Millers Creek
- Moravian Falls Elementary School (Yellow Jackets), Moravian Falls
- Mt. Pleasant Elementary School (Blue Hawks), Ferguson
- Mountain View Elementary School (Dragons), Hays
- Mulberry Elementary School (Mustangs), Mulberry
- North Wilkesboro Elementary School (Eaglets), North Wilkesboro
- Roaring River Elementary School (Blue Jays), Roaring River
- Ronda-Clingman Elementary School (Panthers), Ronda
- Traphill Elementary School (Wildcats), Traphill
- Wilkesboro Elementary School (Eagles), Wilkesboro

=== Charter schools ===
There is only one charter school in Wilkes County: Bridges Charter School in State Road, North Carolina.

== Athletics ==
The high schools in the Wilkes County Schools system are members of the North Carolina High School Athletic Association (NCHSAA) and compete in a variety of sports including football, basketball, baseball, softball, soccer, wrestling, volleyball, tennis, golf, cross country, track and field, swimming, and cheerleading.

Beginning with the 2025–26 school year, the NCHSAA expanded from four athletic classifications to eight classifications as part of a statewide realignment.

As of the 2025–29 athletic realignment cycle:

- East Wilkes High School competes as a 2A school.
- North Wilkes High School competes as a 3A school.
- West Wilkes High School competes as a 3A school.
- Wilkes Central High School competes as a 4A school.
- Wilkes Early College High School does not field varsity athletic teams.

East Wilkes, North Wilkes, West Wilkes, and Wilkes Central compete together in the NCHSAA 2A/3A/4A Conference D alongside Ashe County, Alleghany, Elkin, and Starmount.

== Achievements and awards ==
Several schools in the Wilkes County Schools district have received state and national recognition for academics, career readiness, and overall school performance.

U.S. News & World Report previously recognized Wilkes Central High School and West Wilkes High School among its "America's Best High Schools" rankings, with Wilkes Central receiving a Silver designation and West Wilkes receiving a Bronze designation.

In more recent rankings, Wilkes Early College High School has been recognized among the top public high schools in North Carolina by multiple educational ranking organizations, including Niche.

Moravian Falls Elementary School was recognized by U.S. News & World Report as one of the top-performing elementary schools in North Carolina and was named the highest-ranked elementary school in Wilkes County in the publication's 2022 rankings.

Schools throughout the district have also received recognition for athletics, career and technical education, graduation rates, and academic growth through the North Carolina Department of Public Instruction and the North Carolina High School Athletic Association.

== See also ==
- Elkin City Schools also serves some residents of Wilkes County.
- List of school districts in North Carolina
