= North Carolina Highway 16 =

State highway in North Carolina, US

North Carolina Highway 16

- Route of NC 16 highlighted in red

Route information
- Maintained by NCDOT
- Length: 143.8 mi (231.4 km)
- Existed: 1921–present

Major junctions
- South end: NC 75 in Waxhaw
- I-485 in Charlotte (twice); I-277 / US 74 / NC 27 in Charlotte; I-77 / US 21 in Charlotte; I-85 in Charlotte; I-40 in Conover; US 70 in Conover; US 64 in Taylorsville; US 421 / NC 18 in Wilkesboro; US 221 / NC 88 near Jefferson
- North end: SR 16 at the Virginia state line near Grassy Creek

Location
- Country: United States
- State: North Carolina
- Counties: Union, Mecklenburg, Gaston, Lincoln, Catawba, Alexander, Wilkes, Ashe

Highway system
- North Carolina Highway System; Interstate; US; State; Scenic
← US 15	→ US 17

North Carolina Highway 16 (NC 16) is a 143.8-mile (231.4 km) primary state highway in the U.S. state of North Carolina. Traveling in a north–south direction, it connects the cities and towns of Charlotte, Newton, Conover, Taylorsville, Wilkesboro and Jefferson, linking the Charlotte metropolitan area with the mountainous High Country. NC 16 is part of a three-state route 16 that connects the Charlotte region with northwestern West Virginia.

== Route description ==
NC 16 is part of a three-state highway 16, that totals 475 miles (764 km), from Waxhaw, North Carolina to St. Marys, West Virginia.

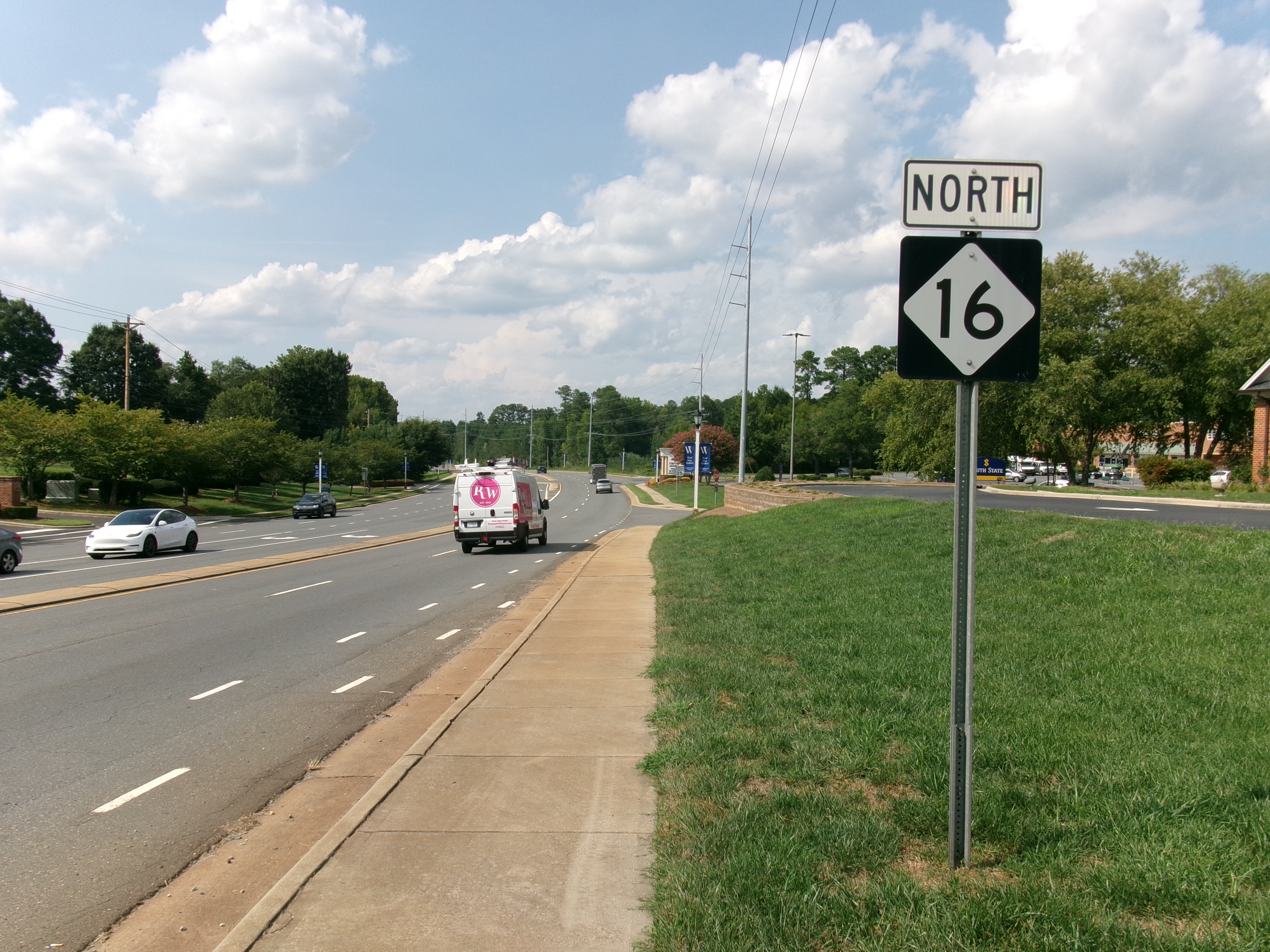
View north along NC 16 past the western terminus of NC 84 in Weddington

NC 16 begins as a two-lane road in Waxhaw, from its intersection with NC 75 (Main Street), it travels north along Broome Street to Weddington, where it widens to four-lane and becomes Providence Road. After crossing the Union-Mecklenburg county line, it enters Charlotte's city limit. Along Providence Road, NC 16 connects with I-485 (exit 57) and NC 51 (Pineville-Matthews Road). In the Cherry neighborhood, Providence Road becomes 3rd Street; at the intersection of Charlottetowne Avenue, northbound NC 16 changes over to 4th Street, while southbound remains on 3rd Street. As NC 16 enters Uptown Charlotte, it merges with I-277/US 74 (John Belk Freeway, exit 2A); southbound travelers will encounter an awkward u-turn at 3rd Street to get on over to 4th Street. Going counter-clockwise around Uptown Charlotte, John Belk Freeway becomes Brookshire Freeway (with US 74 leaving to follow Independence Boulevard out of the city); at the I-77/US 21 interchange (exit 5/exit 11), NC 16's concurrency with I-277 ends and the highway becomes Brookshire Boulevard. In the Oakview Terrace neighborhood, NC 16 connects with I-85 (exit 36). In the Paw Creek neighborhood, NC 16 connects again with I-485 (exit 16) before leaving the Charlotte city limits. In this vicinity, NC 16 becomes expressway standard, crossing the Rozzelles Ferry Bridge over Mountain Island Lake/Catawba River, also entering into Gaston County.

In Lucia, NC 16 Business splits from mainline NC 16, where it travels 16.2 miles (26.1 km) through Lowesville, Triangle and Denver, before merging back at Chronicle. NC 16 through Gaston, Lincoln and southeast Catawba County features the superstreet design with some at-grade intersections. Speed limit is 65 miles per hour (105 km/h) on this portion of highway. Entering into Killian Crossroads going to Newton, NC 16 drops to 55 miles per hour (89 km/h). Also heading towards Newton, NC 16 Business splits and follows the old alignment through downtown Newton and Conover, while mainline NC 16 travels along a four-lane bypass east of both cities. After crossing I-40 (exit 132), NC 16 Business rejoins mainline NC 16, continuing north as a two-lane rural highway. At Lookout Shoals Lake/Catawba River, NC 16 enters Alexander County.

Traveling through Millersville and Isenhour Park, NC 16 connects with US 64 and NC 90 in Taylorsville. Continuing north, the highway meanders through the Brushy Mountains, entering Wilkes County at Kilby Gap (1,657 feet (505 m)). At Moravian Falls, NC 18 merges with NC 16 as the highway straightens out towards Wilkesboro. At US 421 (exit 286A), switches concurrency as NC 18 continues into downtown Wilkesboro. After 4 miles (6.4 km), NC 16 splits with US 421, which continues towards Boone. In a northwesterly direction, NC 16 travels through Millers Creek and Wilbar before ascending along Piney Ridge and entering Ashe County at Horse Gap (3,110 feet (950 m), highest point along route).

Immediately entering Ashe County is the Blue Ridge Parkway followed by NC 163 towards West Jefferson. Continuing north, through Glendale Springs, NC 16 joins NC 88 in Index, then goes northeasterly to Jefferson, where it switches concurrency with US 221. After 1.32 miles (2.12 km), NC 16 splits from US 221, which continues on towards Sparta. Continuing 12 miles (19 km) north, it reaches the Virginia state line near Grassy Creek, where it continues on as SR 16, towards Mouth of Wilson.

== History ==
NC 16 was established in 1921 as an original state highway, traveling from SC 16, at the South Carolina state line, north through Gastonia, Dallas and Lincolnton, to NC 10, in Conover.

In 1926, NC 16 was rerouted along Aspen Street in Lincolnton towards High Shoals, removing it from a short concurrency with NC 27 to Boger City. In 1929, NC 16 was extended north through Taylorsville and Wilkesboro, replacing NC 67; then northwest through Jefferson and then west to the Tennessee state lane, replacing NC 68. In 1930, US 321 was assigned onto NC 16 between the South Carolina state line to Conover.

In 1934, NC 16 was truncated at US 64/US 70/US 321, in Conover; its former routing south replaced by US 321. In 1937, NC 16 was rerouted to its current alignment between Millers Creek and Glendale Springs, leaving behind secondary roads Old North Carolina Highway 16 (SR 1562 and SR 1559 in Wilkes County, SR 1648 in Ashe County) and Trading Post Road (SR 1632). Around 1940, NC 16 was extended south of Conover, via US 321 to Newton, then southeast through Denver and Charlotte, to its current southern terminus at NC 75, in Waxhaw; the new routing replaced part of NC 73 and all of NC 271 and NC 262. In 1940, NC 16 was rerouted to its current northern terminus at the Virginia state line, in Grassy Creek, with continuation as SR 92 to Mouth of Wilson. Its old alignment, through Jefferson, to the Tennessee state line was replaced by NC 88; while NC 16 replaced all of NC 681.

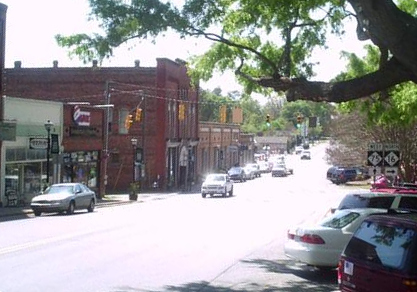
NC 16's southern terminus in Waxhaw

In 1954, NC 16 was rerouted in Wilkesboro, going west on NC 268 and then on new primary road bypassing west of North Wilkesboro. Its old alignment to North Wilkesboro continued on as NC 18; while Boone Trail (SR 1500), to Cricket, was downgraded. In 1958, NC 16 was placed on new primary road west from its former alignment, Old North Carolina Highway 16 (SR 1573), bypassing Crumpler and Grassy Creek. In 1962, NC 16 was rerouted, in Charlotte, along Hawthorne Lane from Casewell Street. In 1969, NC 16 was rerouted onto the new bypass route east of Moravian Falls; then added onto new US 421 bypass, in Wilkesboro, going west four miles (6.4 km) then onto new primary routing north to Millers Creek. The old alignment through Cricket were downgraded to secondary roads: Curtis Bridge Road (SR 1185) and Boone Trail (SR 1372). In 1970, NC 16 was converted to one-way streets in Newton, with northbound on College Avenue and southbound on Main Street.

In 1974, NC 16 was rerouted, from Trade Street, onto North Graham Street then northwest onto the Northwest Freeway (future Brookshire Freeway); its old alignment along West Trade Street and Rozzelles Ferry Road were downgraded to secondary roads. In 1977, NC 16 was converted to one-way streets, with northbound along third street and Independence Boulevard, and southbound along Elizabeth Avenue and Hawthorne Lane. Final configuration of NC 16 in Uptown Charlotte came in 1982, with its removal along Hawthorne Lane, Elizabeth Avenue and Trade Street, rerouted along 3rd/4th streets onto the John Belk Freeway then north on the Brookshire Freeway. In 1989, NC 16 was rerouted onto new Brookshire Boulevard in northwest Mecklenburg County; its former alignment along BellHaven Boulevard and Rozzelles Ferry Road were downgraded to secondary roads.

In 1990, NC 16 was placed on new four-lane expressway between Mountain Island Lake and Lucia; part of its old alignment was downgraded to secondary road, while NC 273 was extended along most of it. In 2007, NC 16 was extended on new four-lane freeway between Lucia and NC 73; its old alignment through Lowesville become NC 16 Business. In 2008, NC 16 was placed on new four-lane boulevard bypass east of Newton; its old alignment becomes the second NC 16 Business loop.

In 2012, NC 16 was placed on new 10.5-mile (16.9 km) four-lane expressway, from NC 73 to Chronicle; its old alignment through Denver becomes an extension of NC 16 Business from Lowesville.

=== North Carolina Highway 262 ===
North Carolina Highway 262
- Location: Waxhaw–Charlotte
- Length: 22.4 mi (36.0 km)
- Existed: 1930–1940

North Carolina Highway 262 (NC 262) appeared in 1930 as new primary routing from NC 25, in Waxhaw, to US 74/NC 20 (7th Street), in Charlotte. In 1940, it was entirely replaced by an extension of NC 16.

=== North Carolina Highway 271 ===
North Carolina Highway 271
- Location: Thrift–Charlotte
- Existed: 1926–1940

North Carolina Highway 271 (NC 271) appeared in 1926 running from Thrift to NC 20 near Charlotte. In 1931 the road was extended north to NC 10 in Newton. The next year the original section of NC 271 was renumbered as part NC 27A. Two years later NC 271 was truncated to Triangle with the routing from Triangle to Newton becoming a part of NC 73. In 1940 the rest of the road was renumbered as part of NC 16.

=== North Carolina Highway 681 ===
North Carolina Highway 681
- Location: Jefferson–VA state line
- Existed: 1928–1940

North Carolina Highway 681 (NC 681) was established in 1928 as a renumbering of part of NC 68; traveling from NC 68/NC 69, in Jefferson, to the Virginia state line, at Grassy Creek. In 1931, Virginia established SR 139 to connect with NC 681 at the state line, which continued to Mouth of Wilson. In 1940, the route was decommissioned in favor of NC 16.

== Major intersections ==
County	Location	mi	km	Destinations	Notes
Union	Waxhaw	0.0	0.0	NC 75 (Main Street) – Monroe, Lancaster	Southern terminus
Union	Weddington	6.5	10.5	Rea Road	
Union	Weddington	7.2	11.6	NC 84 east (Weddington Road) – Monroe	Western terminus of NC 84
Mecklenburg	Charlotte	9.9	15.9	I-485 (Governor James G. Martin Freeway) – Matthews, Pineville	I-485 exit 57
Mecklenburg	Charlotte	10.0	16.1	Ballantyne Commons Parkway (west side) McKee Road (east side)	
Mecklenburg	Charlotte	12.8	20.6	NC 51 (Pineville-Matthews Road)	
Mecklenburg	Charlotte	16.8	27.0	Fairview Road (west side) Sardis Road (east side)	
Mecklenburg	Charlotte	18.8	30.3	S Wendover Road	
Mecklenburg	Charlotte	22.0	35.4	I-277 south / US 74 west / NC 27 west (John Belk Freeway)	South end of I-277 and west end of US 74 / NC 27 overlap
Mecklenburg	Charlotte			NC 16 overlaps with Interstate 277 (exits 2A to 5)	
Mecklenburg	Charlotte	24.4	39.3	I-77 / US 21 (Bill Lee Freeway) / I-277 ends – Statesville, Columbia	North end of I-277 overlap; I-77 exit 11
Mecklenburg	Charlotte	25.0	40.2	Beatties Ford Road–– Johnson C. Smith University	
Mecklenburg	Charlotte	26.6	42.8	I-85 – Concord, Gastonia	I-85 exit 36
Mecklenburg	Charlotte	32.2	51.8	I-485 (Craig Lawing Freeway) – Huntersville, Pineville	I-485 exit 16
Mecklenburg	Charlotte	32.5	52.3	Mount Holly–Huntersville Road	Continuous-flow intersection
Mecklenburg	Mountain Island Lake	34.8	56.0	Rozzelles Ferry Bridge	
Gaston	Lucia	37.6	60.5	NC 16 Bus. north (Lucia Riverbend Highway) to NC 273	
Lincoln	Lowesville	42.5	68.4	NC 73 – Lincolnton, Huntersville	
Catawba		51.1	82.2	NC 150 – Lincolnton, Mooresville	
Catawba		53.0	85.3	NC 16 Bus. south – Denver	
Catawba		61.6	99.1	NC 16 Bus. north – Newton	
Catawba		62.5	100.6	NC 10 – Newton	
Catawba	Conover	65.5	105.4	US 70 (Conover Boulevard) – Conover	
Catawba	Conover	67.0	107.8	I-40 – Statesville, Hickory	I-40 exit 132
Catawba	Conover	67.2	108.1	NC 16 Bus. south (1st Avenue) – Conover	
Alexander	Taylorsville	81.2	130.7	US 64 – Statesville, Lenoir	
Alexander	Taylorsville	82.2	132.3	NC 90 (Main Street) – Statesville	East end of NC 90 overlap
Alexander	Taylorsville	82.7	133.1	NC 90 (Main Street) – Lenoir	West end of NC 90 overlap
Wilkes	Moravian Falls	96.3	155.0	NC 18 south – Lenoir	South end of NC 18 overlap
Wilkes	Wilkesboro	99.4	160.0	US 421 south / NC 18 north – Winston-Salem, Wilkesboro	South end of US 421 and north end of NC 18 overlaps
Wilkes	Wilkesboro	100.3	161.4	NC 268 – Wilkesboro Downtown	To Wilkes Community College and W. Kerr Scott Dam and Reservoir
Wilkes	Wilkesboro	101.3	163.0	US 421 Bus. south (Curtis Bridge Road) – North Wilkesboro	
Wilkes	Wilkesboro	103.9	167.2	US 421 north – Boone	North end of US 421 overlap
Ashe		119.8	192.8	Blue Ridge Parkway	
Ashe		120.2	193.4	NC 163 west – West Jefferson	
Ashe	Index	126.7	203.9	NC 88 east – Sparta	East end of NC 88 overlap
Ashe	Jefferson	129.8	208.9	US 221 south / NC 88 west – Jefferson	South end of US 221 and west end of NC 88 overlaps
Ashe		131.2	211.1	US 221 north – Sparta	North end of US 221 overlap
Ashe	Grassy Creek	143.8	231.4	SR 16 north (Jefferson Highway) – Mouth of Wilson	Continuation to Virginia
1.000 mi = 1.609 km; 1.000 km = 0.621 mi: Concurrency terminus

== Special routes ==
=== Lowesville–Denver business loop ===
North Carolina Highway 16 Business
- Location: Lucia–Chronicle
- Length: 16.2 mi (26.1 km)
- Existed: 2007–present

North Carolina Highway 16 Business (NC 16 Bus) was established in December 2007 when NC 16 was placed on new construction between Lucia and Lowesville, its old alignment becoming a business loop. In March 2012, NC 16 Business was extended north to its current terminus at Anderson Mountain, north of Chronicle, after mainline NC 16 was moved onto new construction bypassing Denver. NC 16 Business also connects the communities of Triangle and Westport, along the western banks of Lake Norman.

=== Newton–Conover business loop ===
North Carolina Highway 16 Business
- Location: Newton–Conover, NC
- Length: 6.6 mi (10.6 km)
- Existed: 2008–present

North Carolina Highway 16 Business (NC 16 Bus) was established in January 2008 when NC 16 was placed on new construction east Newton andConover, its old alignment becoming a business loop. In Newton, it traverses along Charlotte Highway, D Street, College Street (northbound only) and Main Street. In Conover, it traverses completely on 1st Avenue. In November, 2012, a new overpass was built over I-40; the old overpass was originally connected to the I-40 (exit 131) before exit 132 was built.

=== Newton truck route ===
North Carolina Highway 16 Truck
- Location: Newton, North Carolina
- Length: 2.7 mi (4.3 km)

North Carolina Highway 16 Truck (NC 16 Truck) provides a different routing along NC 16 Business for truck drivers, bypassing downtown Newton. The route begins west on D and C Streets (overlap with NC 10), then north on Southwest Boulevard (overlap with US 321 Bus) and finally east on 20th Avenue, reconnecting with NC 16 Business.

=== Taylorsville truck route ===
North Carolina Highway 16 Truck
- Location: Taylorsville, North Carolina
- Length: 2.0 mi (3.2 km)

North Carolina Highway 16 Truck (NC 16 Truck) provides truck drivers, that are passing through, a different route that bypasses the downtown area of Taylorsville, via US 64 and Liledoun Road.
