= EWHS =

EWHS may refer to:

- East Wake High School, Wendell, North Carolina, United States
- East Wilkes High School, Rhonda, North Carolina, United States
- Eastern Wayne High School, Wayne County, North Carolina, United States
- Edmonds Woodway High School, Edmonds, Washington, United States
- Edmondson-Westside High School, Baltimore, Maryland, United States
