= Wilkes Central High School =

American public school in North Carolina

Location
- 1179 Moravian Falls Rd; Wilkesboro, North Carolina 28697; United States
- Coordinates: 36°09′08″N 81°08′37″W

Information
- Type: Public
- Established: 1951 (75 years ago)
- CEEB code: 342930
- Principal: Heather Freeman
- Staff: 49.95 (FTE)
- Grades: 9–12
- Enrollment: 752 (2022-2023)
- Student to teacher ratio: 15.06
- Colors: Forest green and gold
- Mascot: Eagle
- Yearbook: The Golden Eagle
- Website: wchs.wilkescountyschools.org

Wilkes Central High School is a public high school (grades 9–12) located in Moravian Falls, North Carolina. It is a part of the Wilkes County Schools system. The school's enrollment is typically around 1,000 students. The school's district includes the towns of Wilkesboro and North Wilkesboro as well as the southern regions of Wilkes County. The current principal of the school is Dr. Heather Freeman. Wilkes Central has the largest enrollment of Wilkes County's four public high schools.

== History ==
Wilkes Central High School was formed in 1951, from a merger of Wilkesboro High School and North Wilkesboro High School. The school's first campus was located on the southern bank of the Yadkin River in Wilkesboro, the county seat. In 1981 the school moved to a new, hilltop campus in the community of Moravian Falls, located just south of Wilkesboro, overlooking the Brushy Mountains. In 1965 Wilkes Central became the first high school in Wilkes County to be racially integrated; that year several students from Wilkes County's all-black high school (called Lincoln Heights) began attending Wilkes Central.

== Academics ==
A normal school day consists of four 90-100 minute blocks with three, half-hour long, lunch periods during 3rd period, and a 35-minute club time called "Eagle Impact".

The school offers career preparation classes and college preparation classes. It offers Honors Mathematics, English, and Science courses. Wilkes Central also offers Advanced Placement courses in subjects such as History, Calculus and English. The language department offers courses in Spanish, and French. Wilkes Central is fully accredited by the Southern Association of Colleges and Schools, also known as SACS. The school yearbook is called The Golden Eagle; the school newspaper is called The Talon.

== Athletics ==
Wilkes Central's sports mascot is the Eagle. Wilkes Central is a member of the North Carolina High School Athletic Association and is classified as a 2A school. The school is a member of the Mountain Valley Athletic Conference, which includes 1A and 2A schools from Wilkes County and neighboring counties in North Carolina. The school's colors are forest green and gold.

=== State championships ===
- 2A Women's Tennis Team State Champions (2002)
- 2A Men's Soccer State Champions (2005)
- 2A Women's Basketball State Champions (2015)
- 2A Men's Golf State Champions (2016)
- Many Individual Men and Women Cross Country and Track and Field State Champions

== Notable alumni ==
- Nicholas Cirillo, (born 1997), actor and producer
- Rhoda Bryan Billings, (1937–2025), American Justice, Member 0f the North Carolina Supreme Court (1985–1986) and Chief Justice (1986).
- Zach Galifianakis, (born 1969), actor and stand-up comedian
- Deneen Graham, (born 1964), first African-American to win the Miss North Carolina beauty pageant
- Shirrel Rhoades, (born 1942), former executive vice-president of Marvel Entertainment and publisher of Marvel Comics
- John Swofford, (born 1948), Commissioner of the Atlantic Coast Conference (ACC) from 1997 to 2021; Athletic Director of the University of North Carolina at Chapel Hill from 1980 to 1997. Has also served as the Chairman of the Bowl Championship Series (BCS) in college football.
- William Oliver Swofford (1945–2000), pop singer known as "Oliver", recorded two hit singles in 1969, "Good Morning Starshine" and "Jean"; older brother of John Swofford

== See also ==
List of high schools in North Carolina
