= North Wilkes High School =

American public school in North Carolina

Location
- 2986 Traphill Road; Hays, North Carolina 28635; United States
- Coordinates: 36°16′56″N 81°05′58″W

Information
- Type: Public
- Established: 1956 (70 years ago)
- School district: Wilkes County Schools
- Superintendent: Wesley Wood (interim)
- CEEB code: 341747
- Principal: Deborah "DeeAnn" Surgeon
- Teaching staff: 40.07 (FTE)
- Grades: 9–12
- Enrollment: 578 (2024–2025)
- Student to teacher ratio: 14.42
- Colors: Royal blue, yellow, and white with accents of red
- Mascot: Viking
- Yearbook: Northwind
- Website: nwhs.wilkescountyschools.org

North Wilkes High School is a public high school located in Hays, North Carolina, serving grades 9–12 as part of the Wilkes County Schools system. The school's district includes much of northern Wilkes County, including the communities of Traphill, Hays, McGrady, Mulberry, and portions of North Wilkesboro.

North Wilkes High School was established in 1956. Much of the original campus, built during the 1950s, was demolished in 2006 and replaced with newer classroom buildings connected by enclosed hallways lined with student lockers. Portions of the original structure remain in use, including the cafeteria and old gymnasium.

The school is classified as a 3A school by the North Carolina High School Athletic Association (NCHSAA). Beginning with the 2025–26 school year, the NCHSAA expanded from four athletic classifications to eight classifications, resulting in North Wilkes being reclassified from 2A to 3A.

Following the death of Wilkes County Schools superintendent Mark Byrd in 2026, Wesley Wood was named interim superintendent of the district.

North Wilkes High School and the Wilkes County Schools district have consistently performed above state averages in several academic testing categories, including mathematics and English proficiency.

== Athletics ==
The school mascot is the Viking, and the school colors are Royal Blue, white, and red. North Wilkes High School supports varsity teams in the following sports: cheerleading, men's and women's basketball, football, men's baseball, wrestling, women's softball, women's volleyball, men's and women's soccer, men's and women's tennis, cross country, track and field, and swimming.

North Wilkes has competed in the Mountain Valley 1A/2A Conference, the Foothills 2A Conference, and currently competes in the 2A/3A/4A Conference D of the North Carolina High School Athletic Association (NCHSAA). Beginning with the 2025–26 school year, the NCHSAA expanded from four classifications to eight classifications, and North Wilkes was reclassified as a 3A school.

=== State Championships ===
- Wrestling 1A/2A Dual Team State Champions: 1998
- Men's Basketball State Champions: 1961
- Individual Wrestling State Champion: Hunter Dancy (2026)
