= West Wilkes High School =

American public school in North Carolina

Location
- 6598 Boone Trail; Millers Creek, North Carolina 28651; United States
- Coordinates: 36°11′08″N 81°15′34″W

Information
- Type: Public
- CEEB code: 342625
- Principal: Amanda Pruitt
- Staff: 44.42 (FTE)
- Grades: 9–12
- Enrollment: 689 (2018–19)
- Student to teacher ratio: 15.51
- Colors: Orange and black
- Athletics conference: 2-A; Mountain Valley Conference
- Mascot: Blackhawks
- Yearbook: The Hawkeye
- Website: wwhs.wilkescountyschools.org

West Wilkes High School (formerly Millers Creek High School) is a public high school (grades 9–12) located in Millers Creek, North Carolina. It is a part of the Wilkes County Schools system. The school's enrollment is typically around 700 students. The school's district includes the western communities of Wilkes County, including Millers Creek, Purlear, Cricket, Mount Pleasant, Parsonsville, and Wilbar. Announced in the summer preceding the 2025-26 school year, the current principal is Mr. Dan Prouty

On October 17, 2011 former President Barack Obama visited West Wilkes and gave a speech in the school gymnasium as part of his North Carolina, Virginia bus tour promoting the American Jobs Act.

== Academics ==
As of the 2023-24 school year, the schedule consists of four 85 minute periods, with three 30 minute lunch periods during 3rd period. There is a 10 minute break after 1st and 3rd periods, with a 5 minute break after 2nd. In-between 3rd and 4th periods there is an exploratory time, known as "flex time".

The school offers career preparation classes and college preparation classes. It offers Honors Mathematics, English, History, and Science courses. West Wilkes also offers Advanced Placement courses in subjects such as English and History. The language department offers courses in Spanish and Latin. West Wilkes is fully accredited by the Southern Association of Colleges and Schools, also known as SACS.

== Fine Arts ==
Fine Arts is a large commitment at West Wilkes. Fine Arts at West Wilkes include Band, Dance, Theater, and Chorus. As of the 2011–2012 school year the West Wilkes Band had 65 members, and continues to grow. Among the band's achievements are performing at the Daytona 500 (2010), receiving Superior Scores and first place overall 1A Band in the Husky Vanguard Invitational Marching Band Festival (2011), and performing for President Barack Obama during his visit to the school (2011). The West Wilkes dance team, known as the "Struttin' Hawks," have attended many competitions, including the UDA National Dance Team Championship at Walt Disney World, where they placed 2nd in the competition, and the American Cheer and Dance Competition in Atlanta, Georgia, where they finished in 1st place.

== Athletics ==
West Wilkes sports mascot is the Blackhawks. West Wilkes is a member of the North Carolina High School Athletic Association and is classified as a 2A school. The school is a member of the Foothills 2A Athletic Conference, which also includes 2A schools from Wilkes County and neighboring Surry & Yadkin counties in North Carolina. The school's colors are Orange and Black.

== See also ==
List of high schools in North Carolina
