= Shirrel Rhoades =

American writer (born 1942)

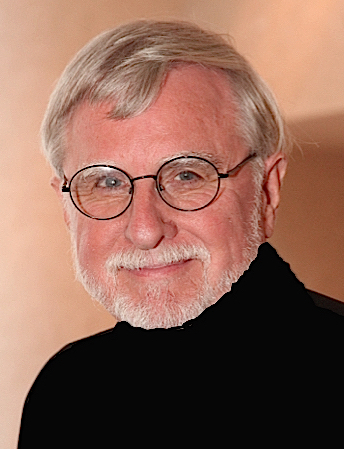
- Shirrel Rhoades in 2012
- Born: May 19, 1942 (age 84) North Wilkesboro, North Carolina, U.S.
- Areas: Writer, publisher, professor, filmmaker, comics scholar, comics historian
- Notable works: Marvel Comics, Reader's Digest, Cricket, Harper's Magazine, Ladies Home Journal, Opportunity Magazine, Magazines: A Complete Guide to the Industry, Comics Books: How the Industry Works, A Complete History of American Comic Books
- Awards: Associated Press

Shirrel Rhoades (/ˈʃɜːrəl ˈroʊdz/ SHUR-əl ROHDZ; born May 19, 1942) is an American writer, publisher, professor, filmmaker, and the former executive vice president of Marvel Entertainment.

== Early life ==
Shirrel Rhoades was born in rural Wilkes County, North Carolina. His father owned a furniture store where his mother helped out. He has a brother, Bill, and a sister, Dawn, both younger by ten and thirteen years.

Rhoades was raised in Mulberry, North Carolina, and attended Wilkes Central High School. He was voted Most Versatile and was a member of the yearbook staff.

After graduating in 1960, he attended Wake Forest University on the George Foster Hankins Scholarship, before transferring to Stetson University, where he received his BA in fine arts in 1964. He also holds graduate credits in children's literature from Chapman University.

== Early writing ==
After college, Rhoades started out as a layout artist with The Florida Times-Union. He quickly became the Sunday Magazine's assistant editor and chief feature writer, as well as the newspaper's film and theater critic. There he won Associated Press and Florida Press Association awards for feature writing.

== Magazines and comics ==
In 1968, Rhoades became the executive editor of Etienne Dupuch Jr. Publications, the Nassau-based publisher of The Bahamas Handbook and other travel and educational titles. In 1972, he returned to the States to launch Directions (a travel magazine for the Great Smoky Mountains region) and created an annual book series and quarterly travel publication about the Cayman Islands.

In 1973, he joined Open Court Publishing in Illinois to launch Cricket, a literary magazine for children. In charge of Open Court's Magazine Division, he launched a British edition called Cricket & Company and oversaw London-based Encounter Magazine.

In 1976, Rhoades became associate publisher of Harper's Magazine during the editorship of Lewis Lapham. Three years later, he was recruited to Charter Publishing as vice president of consumer marketing for Ladies' Home Journal, Redbook, and Sport.

After an interim assignment with American Heritage, Rhoades joined Scholastic in 1983 to launch Family Computing magazine. As vice president and group publisher, he simultaneously oversaw Scholastic's Consumer and Professional Magazines divisions.

In 1988, he purchased his own periodical, Opportunity Magazine. Later he would launch a sister publication, Income Plu$, both aimed at small business entrepreneurs. Through a separate company he published a number of newsletters, including Woman's Day Helpful Hints.

In 1996, Rhoades became executive vice president of Marvel Entertainment, succeeding Stan Lee as publisher of Marvel Comics. He left Marvel three years later following the "Comic Wars." Joining Reader's Digest as vice president of New Business Development, he went on to launch a new book division for RDA.

During the early 2000s he served on a consulting basis as editorial director and fiction editor for The Saturday Evening Post.

In 2013 Rhoades, along with attorney Albert L. Kelley, founded Absolutely Amazing eBooks, a virtual publishing company that specializes in ebooks and POD paperbacks. In 2015 they also acquired New Pulp Press, an award-winning publishing house known for its crime fiction and noir mysteries.

== Consulting ==
For a number of years Rhoades has acted as consultant and advisor to dozens of companies, domestic and international. His clients have included Microsoft, Warner Bros., Time Inc., DC Comics, Mad Magazine, Disney Publishing, Hilton International, Discovery Channel, Canadian Living, Annie's, Strategic Fulfillment Group (SFG), Grey Advertising, J Walter Thompson Direct, Times-Mirror, Highlights for Children, Merk-Medco, Twinlab, Bronson Laboratories, Age Wave Communications, Guideposts, New York, Poets & Writers, Prudential OA, Johnson and Johnson, and Honduras-based OPSA.

He has helped develop strategic plans for such media companies as America Online (AOL), The Saturday Evening Post Society, U.S. Kids, Cowles Media, Mad Magazine, Carus Publishing, and DRG Publishing. He co-authored a worldwide fulfillment strategy for Microsoft.

== Awards and associations ==
Shirrel Rhoades was honored by the Association for Education in Journalism and Mass Communication as Professional of the Year 2014. In 2012 Stetson University honored him as a Distinguished Alumnus. He has chaired the Consumer Marketing Committee of the Magazine Publishers of America and was a member of MPA's Finance Committee. He was nominated for the Direct Marketing Association Hall of Fame in 1997, as well as the Circulation Hall of Fame in 1998. He was inducted into FMA Hall of Fame in 2012; and is a member of the Circulation Survivors Hall of Fame.

He has served on the board of directors of American Family Publishers, XYZ, and other organizations (see Museums below). Also he has been on the advisory board of the New York Academy of Sciences, Home Business Institute, Nancy's Secret Garden, Key West Film Institute, etc.

== Author ==
Shirrel Rhoades is the author/editor/publisher of numerous books. His college textbooks include Magazines: A Complete Guide to the Industry (with David E. Sumner), Comic Books: How the Industry Works, and A Complete History of American Comic Books (a textbook on the history of American comics). He has written a number of bestselling books, many under pen names. These include mysteries, spy novels, science fiction, travel, and children's books.

Rhoades has penned hundreds of magazine articles and thousands of reviews. He is known for his entertainment and travel articles (Saturday Evening Post, Good Old Days, Looking Back, Solares Hill, Sunday Magazine, Tropic Cinema blog, etc.).

== Film critic ==
In addition to his stint as a film critic for the Florida Times-Union in the 1960s, Shirrel Rhoades currently serves as the film critic for the Cooke Communications newspaper chain (Key West Citizen, The Daily Reflector, and the Rocky Mount Telegram, among others). His syndicated column is called Front Row at the Movies. His Top Ten movie lists remain popular with readers. He is a former correspondent for Amusement Business; his movie star profiles were a long-standing feature in Good Old Days magazine; and he has appeared as a regular co-host of Art Waves’ “Film on Friday” radio program on KONK AM. He serves as on-air Film Critic for Channel 19, WEYW.

== Filmmaker ==
At Marvel Entertainment he was involved in planning and producing movies based on Marvel superheroes. He provided publishing support for films (Blade, Daredevil, etc.), approved the rough cut for Men In Black, and was involved in planning later Marvel films like Spider-Man and Iron Man.

In Key West, he produced a series of Official Fantasy Fest DVDs (starring Traci Bingham, Joanna Krupa, Melissa Wolf, etc.). He acted as consulting producer on such films as Key West: City of Color, Veritas, Resurrection Mary, Year of the Donkey, and My New Life, among others. His production company Gee Whiz Entertainment hold the rights for numerous film projects.

== Museums and history ==
A two-time president of Key West Art & Historical Society, he, along with staff, oversaw three museums—Key West Museum of Art & History, Lighthouse & Keeper's Quarters, and Fort East Martello. He has been a lecturer in the KWAHS Distinguished Speaker Series, and a guest presenter at Keys History & Discovery Center. For a number of years he wrote a history column for the Florida Times-Union and has written a number of history-based articles.

== Philanthropy ==
Rhoades continues to donate major photographic collections to colleges, universities, and museums such as Savannah College of Art & Design, Monterey Peninsula College, Ball State University, Florida Keys Community College, Key West Film Society, and Key West Art & Historical Society, among others.

Also he has donated magazine and comic book collections to Savannah College of Art & Design, as well as a significant fossil collection to the Darien Nature Center in Connecticut.

== Professor and lecturer ==
As an adjunct associate professor, Rhoades taught for 17 years in New York University's Center for Publishing, acting as senior faculty member for the Publishing Diploma and master's degree programs. In addition to being a professor in Residence at Ball State University, he has lectured at Columbia University, Rochester Institute of Technology, University of Florida, University of Texas, Baruch, Radcliff Publishing Procedures, FKCC, Monterey Peninsula College, St. Leo's, and Savannah College of Art & Design. He also served as associate chair of the Magazine Publishers of America's Education Committee.

During his publishing career, Rhoades was a frequent speaker at industry functions sponsored by MPA, Folio, FIPP, DMA, FMA, SIPA, Monroe County Law Enforcement, and Women in the Motion Picture Industry. For several years he acted as moderator and seminar leader for Strategic Fulfillment Group's Partner Roundtables.
