= Claymont Hill =

Historic house in North Carolina, United States

- U.S. National Register of Historic Places
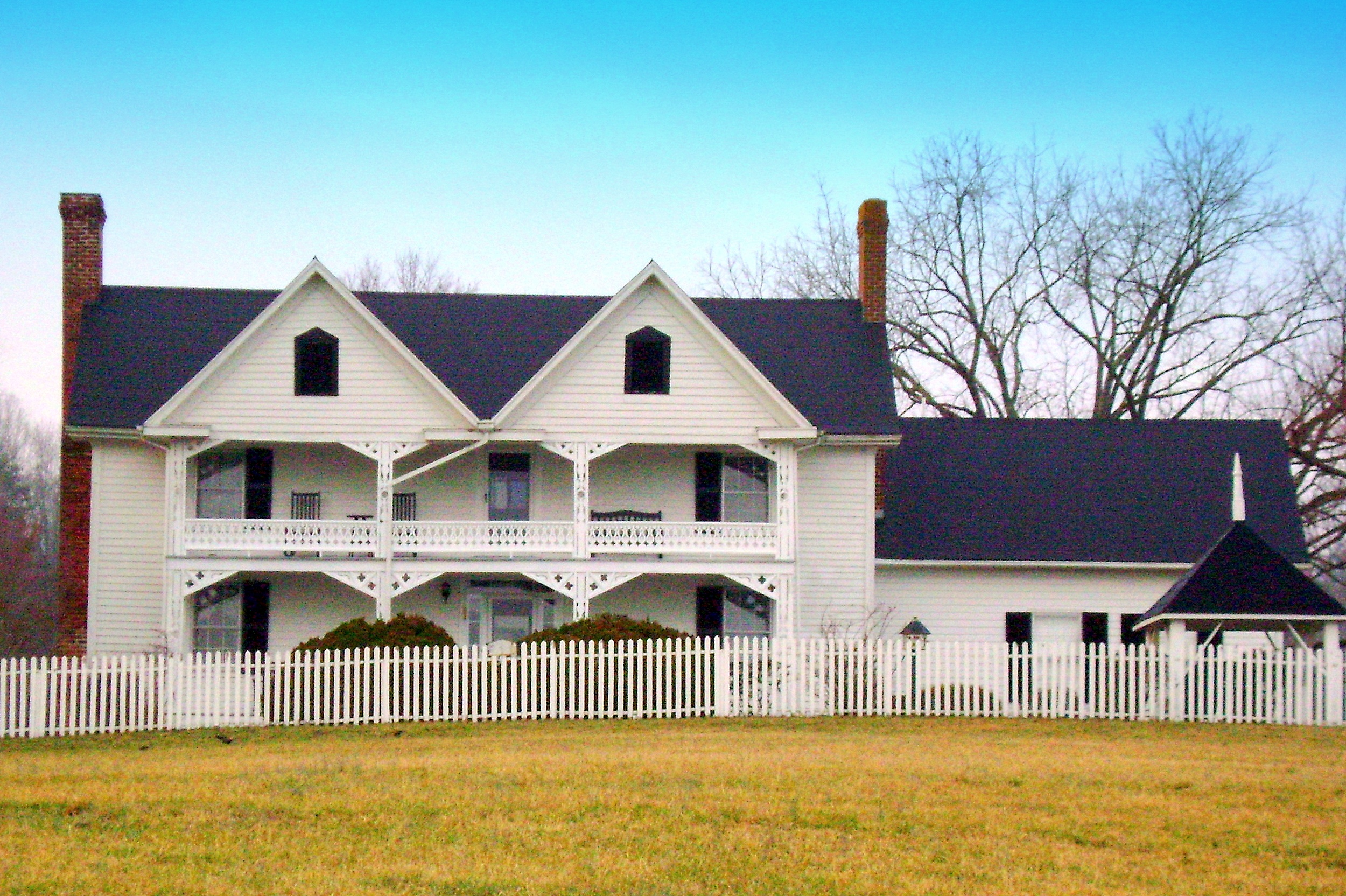
- Claymont Hill, March 2009

- Location within North Carolina Location within the United States
- Location: W side of SR 2303 along Ronda-Clingman Rd. near Ronda, North Carolina
- Coordinates: 36°12′39.1″N 80°56′09.2″W
- Area: 179.3 acres (72.6 ha)
- Built: 1870
- Architectural style: Gothic Revival
- NRHP reference No.: 85002369
- Added to NRHP: September 12, 1985

Claymont Hill, also known as the Albert L. Hendrix House, is a historic home located near Ronda, Wilkes County, North Carolina. It was built in 1870, and is a large two-story, ell-shaped I-house with multiple gables and with two-story porches on three elevations. At its core is a much earlier log structure. It has Gothic Revival style design elements in the gables and sawnwork trim. Also on the property is a contributing former detached kitchen.

It was listed on the National Register of Historic Places in 1985.
