= Wilkes Hosiery Mills =

Historic mill complex in North Carolina, US

- U.S. National Register of Historic Places
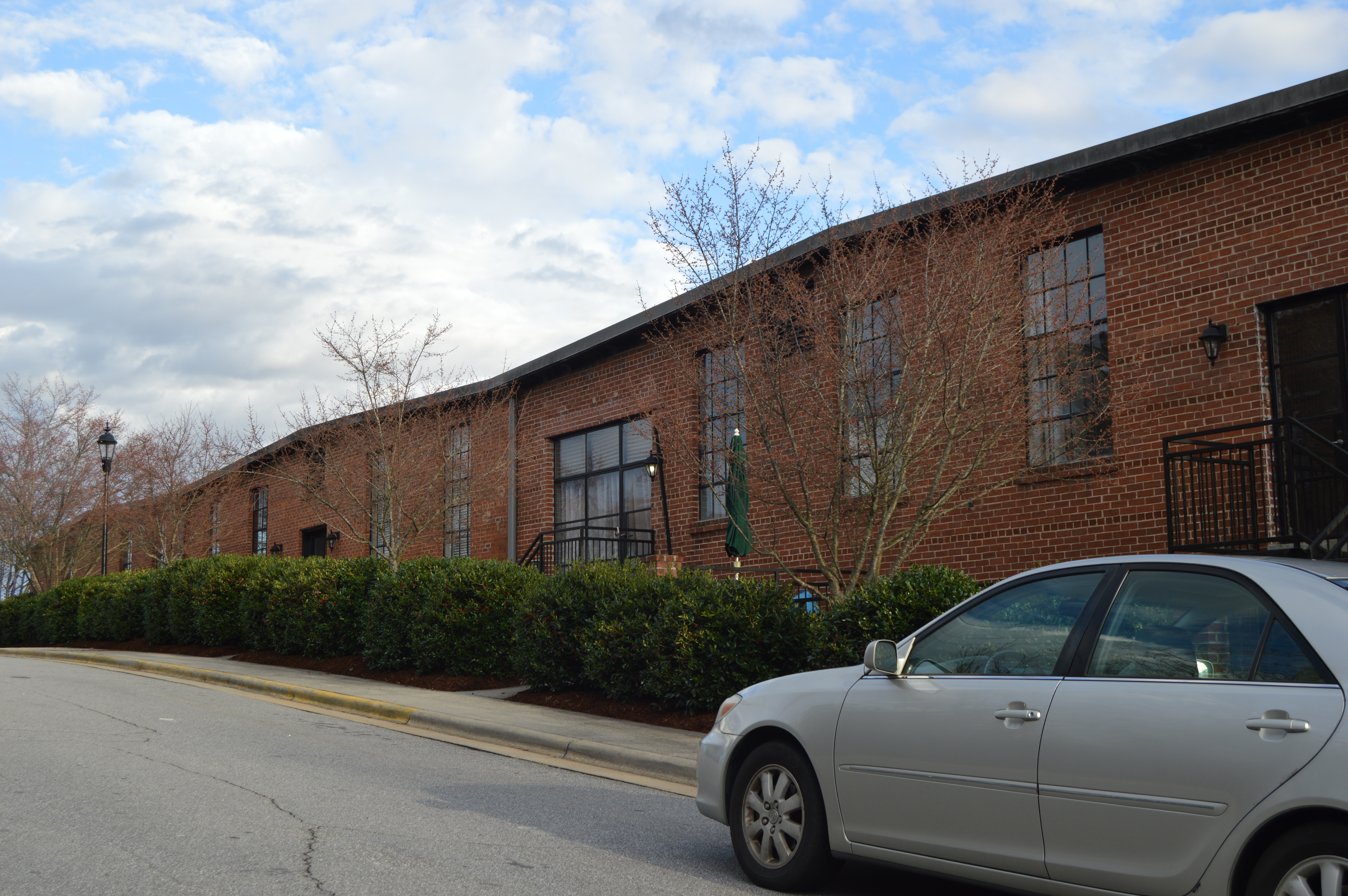
- Northern side

- Location within North Carolina Location within the United States
- Location: 407 F. St., North Wilkesboro, North Carolina
- Coordinates: 36°9′55″N 81°8′32″W
- Area: 1.4 acres (0.57 ha)
- Built: 1923, 1929, 1947
- Built by: Foster and Allen
- Architect: Biberstein & Bowles
- NRHP reference No.: 08000369
- Added to NRHP: April 30, 2008

Wilkes Hosiery Mills is a historic textile mill located near North Wilkesboro, Wilkes County, North Carolina. The brick mill was built in sections between about 1923 and 1967. The 1947 additions and remodeling was carried out by the Charlotte firm Biberstein & Bowles. The textile mill remained in operation until the mid-1960s, after which it was occupied by the Key City Furniture Company until 2003.

It was listed on the National Register of Historic Places in 2008.
