= North Wilkesboro, North Carolina =

- Town
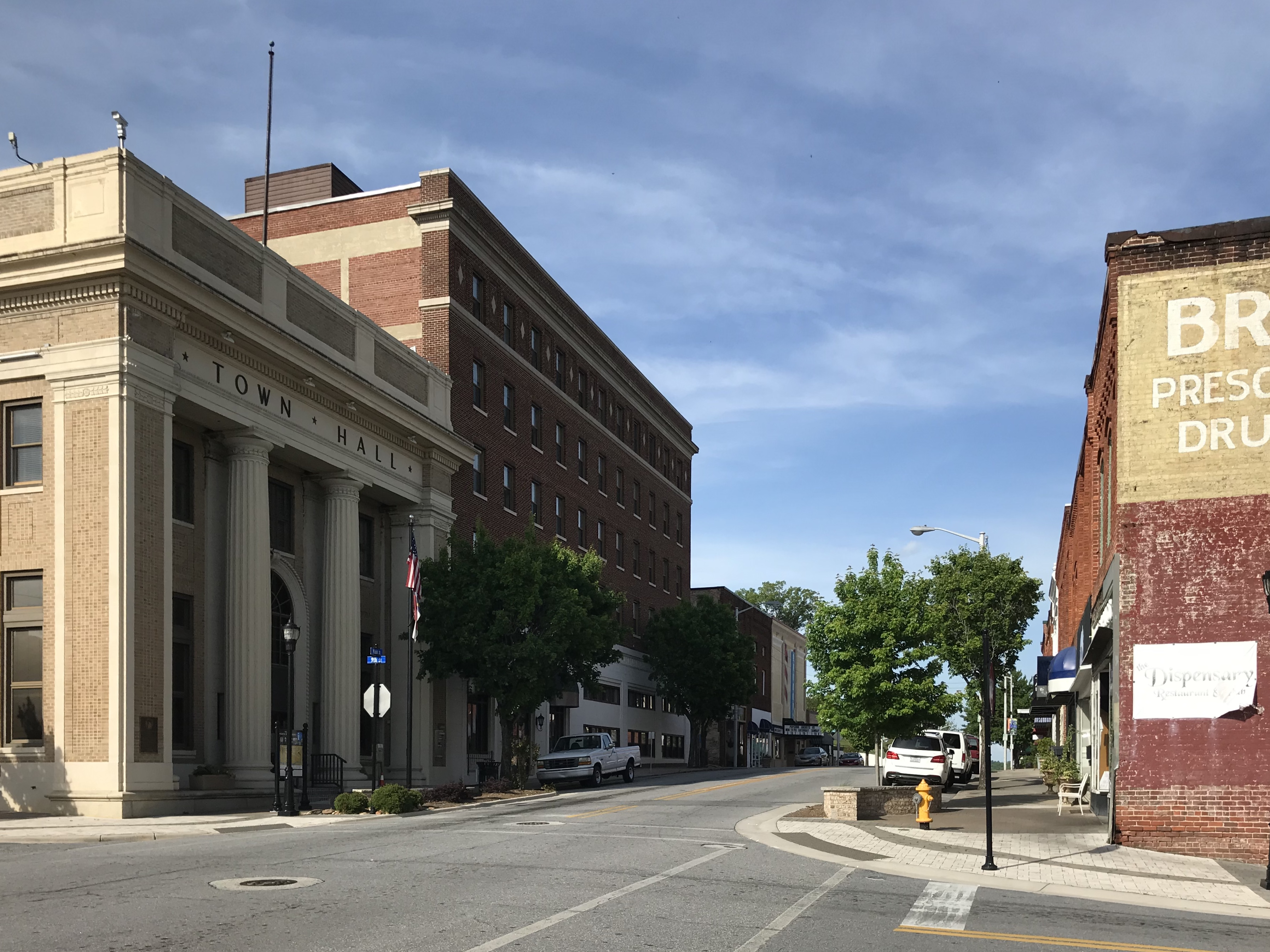
- Downtown North Wilkesboro with Town Hall on the left

- Seal
- Motto: "Key to the Blue Ridge"
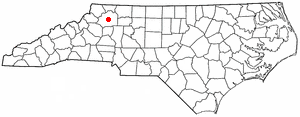
- Location of North Wilkesboro, North Carolina
- Coordinates: 36°10′22″N 81°08′20″W
- Country: United States
- State: North Carolina
- County: Wilkes
- Named for: John Wilkes

Government
  - Mayor: Randy Huffman

Area
  - Total: 6.63 sq mi (17.17 km^{2})
  - Land: 6.63 sq mi (17.17 km^{2})
  - Water: 0 sq mi (0.00 km^{2})
- Elevation: 1,155 ft (352 m)

Population (2020)
  - Total: 4,382
  - Density: 661.1/sq mi (255.24/km^{2})
- Time zone: UTC-5 (Eastern (EST))
  - Summer (DST): UTC-4 (EDT)
- ZIP codes: 28656, 28659, 28674
- Area code: 336/743
- FIPS code: 37-47880
- GNIS feature ID: 2407009
- Website: www.north-wilkesboro.com

North Wilkesboro is a town in Wilkes County, North Carolina, United States. The population was 4,382 at the 2020 United States census. North Wilkesboro is located along the Yadkin River in the foothills of the Blue Ridge Mountains. The town is known as the birthplace and original home of Lowe's Home Improvement and as one of the early centers of stock-car racing. North Wilkesboro Speedway, one of NASCAR's original venues, has played a significant role in the history of the sport since 1947. The town has long used the nickname "Key to the Blue Ridge" due to its proximity to the Blue Ridge Mountains and western North Carolina tourism destinations.

== History ==
North Wilkesboro was founded in 1891 when the Norfolk and Southern Railroad built a railroad line into Wilkes County. The line ended on the northern bank of the Yadkin River opposite Wilkesboro, the county seat. The town of North Wilkesboro quickly developed around the railroad tracks. North Wilkesboro was home of the Carolina Mirror Company, which for many years was the largest mirror factory in the United States. Lowe's Foods, one of the Southeast's largest supermarket chains, was started in North Wilkesboro in 1954. Lowe's Home Improvement Warehouse, the nation's second-largest chain of home-improvement stores, was started in North Wilkesboro in 1946. Like many small towns and cities in rural North Carolina, North Wilkesboro has suffered since 2000 from the closing of nearly all of its textile and furniture factories, which have moved to low-wage locations in Latin America and Asia. The factories were a major part of the town's economic base.

The North Wilkesboro Speedway, located just outside the city limits, predates the founding of NASCAR; the speedway held its first race on May 18, 1947 and from there it grew in popularity. On October 16, 1949, the Speedway held the 8th and final race of the 1949 NASCAR Strictly Stock Division; when the race was over Robert "Red" Byron had become the first NASCAR-sanctioned champion. The North Wilkesboro Speedway held NASCAR races for 50 years; on September 29, 1996 Jeff Gordon would win the final race to be held at the speedway. In 1995, following the death of the long-time owner and track founder Enoch Staley, the speedway was purchased by two new owners, Bob Bahre and Bruton Smith. Soon after their purchase, both men announced that they were closing the speedway and moving its two NASCAR race dates to their new tracks in Texas and New Hampshire. The decision met with strong criticism from race fans. From the track's closure in 1996 through 2021 numerous national and regional news media stories discussed the physical decay of the track and grandstands, the rich history of the track, and efforts to renovate and reopen the speedway. In November 2021, the North Carolina state legislature and NC Governor Roy Cooper gave $18 million to the speedway for extensive repairs and renovations in a major effort to reopen the track for racing. Following the renovations, in August 2022 the speedway held its first races in a decade, drawing a sellout crowd to the CARS Tours Window's World 125. In September 2022 it was announced that the 2023 NASCAR All-Star Race would be held in May 2023 at the North Wilkesboro Speedway, marking the first NASCAR race to be held at the track since its closure in 1996.

The Downtown Main Street Historic District, Thomas B. Finley House, Southern Railway Depot, and Wilkes Hosiery Mills are listed on the National Register of Historic Places.

== Healthcare ==
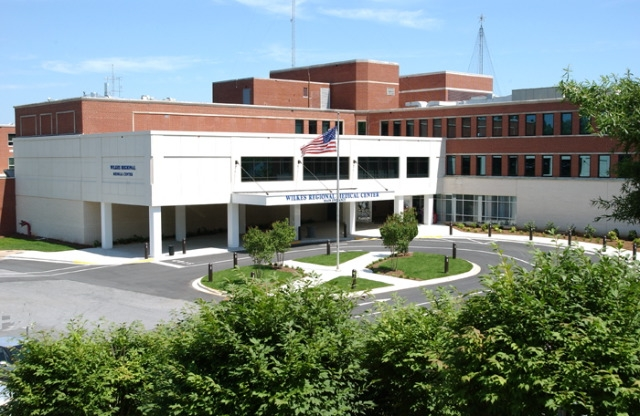
Wilkes Medical Center

Wilkes Medical Center, founded in 1951 as Wilkes General Hospital, is located in North Wilkesboro. It is the largest hospital in northwestern North Carolina and is currently the town's largest employer. West Park, formerly a large shopping center built in the 1970s, has recently been transformed into a large medical park with numerous offices for physicians, medical specialists, pharmacies, physical therapists, and other medical and health-related fields.

In 2017, the hospital joined the Wake Forest Baptist Health system. In 2020, Wake Forest Baptist Health was acquired by the Charlotte-based Atrium Health network to form Atrium Health Wake Forest Baptist.

== Local events ==
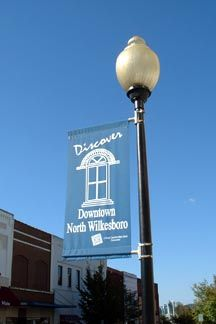
Historic Downtown North Wilkesboro Banner

The downtown business district of North Wilkesboro became a recognized Main Street Town in 2000. The Downtown North Wilkesboro Partnership, a non-profit group that has worked to revitalize the downtown business district, led the effort to have the town recognized as a Main Street Town; the group also sponsors other events to attract people to the downtown area.

The Downtown North Wilkesboro Partnership is also the founder of the annual 'Shine to Wine Festival. Over the past 20 years, numerous local farmers have moved into the winemaking industry and the wine festival gives local wineries and vineyards a chance to display and publicize their wines. The festival also traces the historical development of Wilkes County liquor from moonshine to wine. The 'Shine to Wine festival is held on the first Saturday in May. Other downtown North Wilkesboro festivals include the Downtown Concert Series and Light Up Downtown.

North Wilkesboro is the home of the annual Brushy Mountain Apple Festival, which is held to celebrate the apple harvest from the nearby Brushy Mountains. Crowds of over 160,000 people usually attend the festival, and it is one of the largest single-day arts and crafts fairs in the Southern United States. The festival features music, dancing, artwork, crafts, and food traditional to the Southern Appalachian Mountains. The streets of downtown North Wilkesboro, NC are filled with over 425 arts and crafts, 100 food concessions, and 4 different music stages consisting of Blue Grass, Country, Folk, Gospel, and Appalachian Heritage. Cloggers, folk dancers, rope skippers, and square dancers provide additional entertainment venues for festival goers. Appalachian Heritage crafts such as woodcarving, chair making, soap making, pottery throwing, and quilting are highlighted. Local apple growers set up throughout the festival selling their apples, apple cider, and dried apples.

Light Up Downtown is an annual downtown event focused on the beginning of the Christmas season and the inaugural first day of decorative lights in downtown North Wilkesboro. Santa always makes an appearance to listen to all the children's Christmas wishes. Free pictures are always available to take with Santa. Hayrides are also available to ride around the downtown and enjoy the Christmas lights and decorations. In addition, many food, craft, and merchandise vendors are lined down Main Street. Downtown Retailers are always open late to kick off the Christmas shopping.

== Attractions ==
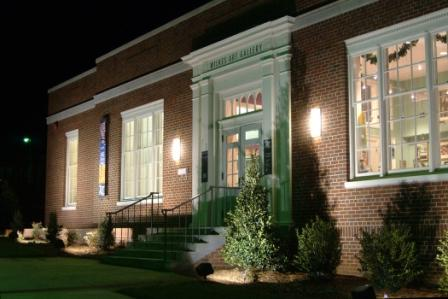
Wilkes Art Gallery

The Wilkes Playmakers, an active local theater group, are based in North Wilkesboro; Each year they do 4-5 shows, most shows attracting people from county wide to come see their plays. They also do events year wide.

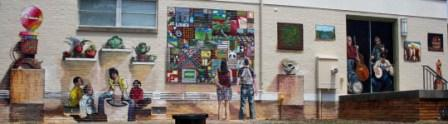
Wilkes Art Gallery Mural Project

The Wilkes Art Gallery was founded in 1962 in the parlor of art patron Annie Winkler's home and in 2004 moved into the renovated North Wilkesboro Post Office building located in the heart of downtown North Wilkesboro. The Gallery's 10,000-square-foot (930 m^{2}) facility includes over 3,500 square feet (330 m^{2}) of exhibition space, an education center with a ceramics studio, painting and drawing studios, two multi-purpose classrooms, and a gift shop.

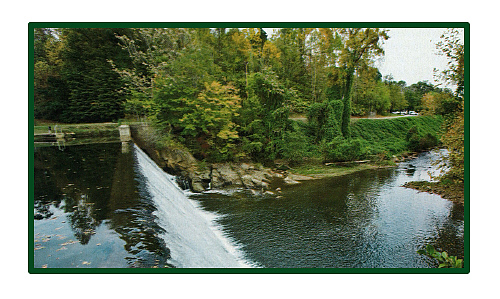
Yadkin River Greenway

North Wilkesboro recently welcomed the Yadkin River Greenway which was created through the cooperative efforts of citizen volunteers, landowners, and the governments of Wilkes County, North Wilkesboro, Wilkesboro, and the State of North Carolina. The effort began in 1994, and the first phase of the greenway was opened on May 18, 2002. The Yadkin River Greenway Council, a non-profit community organization, provided coordination and leadership. The Greenway is a natural area between urban communities where wildlife, vegetation, and streams are preserved and enjoyed. The Greenway contains biking, jogging, and walking trails which follow the Yadkin River and Reddies River for several miles between the towns of North Wilkesboro and Wilkesboro. The Yadkin River Greenway offers over 1.7 miles (2.7 km) of paved trails to form over 5.1 miles (8.2 km) of current trails with more extensions to come in the near future.

== Education ==
=== North Wilkesboro Schools ===
North Wilkesboro is served by the Wilkes County Schools system. The elementary schools which serve the town are Mulberry Elementary, North Wilkesboro Elementary, and CC Wright Elementary. Middle school students in North Wilkesboro attend Central Wilkes Middle School in the community of Moravian Falls, located south of the town. The town's high school students attend Wilkes Central High School, based in Moravian Falls, West Wilkes High School, based in Millers Creek, or Wilkes Early College High School, located on the campus of Wilkes Community College. Several private schools also serve the town, most are associated with the larger Protestant churches in the area. Wilkes Community College, located in the neighboring town of Wilkesboro, offers college classes to North Wilkesboro's residents.

== Geography ==
North Wilkesboro is located along the Yadkin River at the mouth of the Reddies River. North Wilkesboro has long been known as the "Key to the Blue Ridge" and is adjacent to the Brushy Mountains, Stone Mountain State Park, and the Blue Ridge Parkway. Located a few miles away, the W. Kerr Scott Dam and Reservoir offers its visitors a pristine wilderness to go mountain biking, boating, swimming, camping, picnicking, hunting, and fishing around its 55-mile (89 km) shoreline. The Town of North Wilkesboro is located in the heart of Wilkes County, North Carolina in the northwestern corner of the state. Wilkes County is bordered by eight (8) counties. These include the counties of Alexander, Alleghany, Ashe, Caldwell, Iredell, Surry, Watauga, and Yadkin; thus making the town conveniently juxtaposed to eight county seats and economic hubs; all within a 45-minute drive from town. The town corporate limits cover approximately 7.5 square miles (~ 4,800 acres) of contiguous property with approximately 300 acres in satellite territories. The Extraterritorial Jurisdiction (ETJ) encompasses roughly 16 square miles (41 km^{2}) or 10,240 acres. The town is bordered to the south by the Yadkin River and the Town of Wilkesboro. Running through the eastern portion of the town is the Reddies River which flows from North to South and unites with the Yadkin. Hoopers Branch, a tributary to the Reddies River, rises on the north side of North Wilkesboro.

== Transportation ==
US-421	NC-268	NC-115	NC-18

The town serves as the junction point for NC State Highways 18 and 268 and is within one mile (1.6 km) to the north of US Highway 421. US 421 Business, however, passes through the town and allows transportation to the nearby cities of Winston-Salem and Boone, home of Appalachian State University. The town also serves as the northern end of NC Highway 115, which runs south to Charlotte.

=== Surrounding transportation ===
I-77	NC-16

North Wilkesboro is approximately 20 minutes west of Interstate 77. Interstate 77 runs North to South, allowing shipping and transportation to travel up and down the east coast. I-77 serves as the nearest major interstate to the county in addition to the town itself. North Wilkesboro is also in close proximity to NC Highway 16 which runs through Wilkesboro.

=== Public transportation ===
North Wilkesboro and Wilkes County are served by the Wilkes Transportation Authority, known commonly as the WTA. The WTA provides Wilkes with its only scheduled public transportation service as well providing rural communities within the county with transportation by booking in advance.

== Climate ==
North Wilkesboro rests in the foothills to the east of the Blue Ridge escarpment; which encompasses the western edge of Wilkes County. The town's position in relation to the abutting mountain system accounts for the mild, yet wet winters and summers. The average annual maximum temperature is 68.7 degrees Fahrenheit with a corresponding minimum annual temperature average of 45.7 degrees. Average annual rainfall (49.6 inches) for the town falls just short of the typical average of the Southern Appalachian region (60.0+ inches). As winter clouds approach from the west and migrate across the Blue Ridge, an orographic effect ensues which releases an amount of snow in the Western high country, leaving little for central and eastern Wilkes County as the systems pass over. The result is more of a wintry mix of sleet and frozen rain, hence the 5.9 inches of average total snowfall, but the lack of any snow depth. North Wilkesboro has a humid subtropical climate (Cfa) and the hardiness zone is 7B.

Climate data for North Wilkesboro, North Carolina (1991–2020 normals, extremes 1955–present)
Month	Jan	Feb	Mar	Apr	May	Jun	Jul	Aug	Sep	Oct	Nov	Dec	Year
Record high °F (°C)	79 (26)	83 (28)	88 (31)	94 (34)	96 (36)	102 (39)	101 (38)	102 (39)	96 (36)	94 (34)	85 (29)	81 (27)	102 (39)
Mean daily maximum °F (°C)	47.9 (8.8)	51.8 (11.0)	60.0 (15.6)	69.4 (20.8)	77.0 (25.0)	84.5 (29.2)	87.3 (30.7)	85.9 (29.9)	79.6 (26.4)	70.3 (21.3)	60.8 (16.0)	50.3 (10.2)	68.7 (20.4)
Daily mean °F (°C)	37.4 (3.0)	40.2 (4.6)	47.4 (8.6)	56.9 (13.8)	65.2 (18.4)	72.9 (22.7)	75.7 (24.3)	74.8 (23.8)	69.1 (20.6)	58.6 (14.8)	48.0 (8.9)	40.7 (4.8)	57.2 (14.0)
Mean daily minimum °F (°C)	26.8 (−2.9)	29.2 (−1.6)	35.7 (2.1)	43.5 (6.4)	52.7 (11.5)	62.1 (16.7)	65.7 (18.7)	64.9 (18.3)	57.3 (14.1)	45.4 (7.4)	36.5 (2.5)	28.9 (−1.7)	45.8 (7.7)
Record low °F (°C)	−9 (−23)	−6 (−21)	2 (−17)	18 (−8)	28 (−2)	37 (3)	44 (7)	42 (6)	30 (−1)	16 (−9)	7 (−14)	−3 (−19)	−9 (−23)
Average precipitation inches (cm)	4 (10)	3.7 (9.4)	4.6 (12)	4.1 (10)	4.3 (11)	4.4 (11)	4.6 (12)	4.9 (12)	4.1 (10)	3.5 (8.9)	3.5 (8.9)	3.9 (9.9)	49.6 (126)
Average snowfall inches (cm)	2.2 (5.6)	2 (5.1)	0.8 (2.0)	0.0 (0.0)	0.0 (0.0)	0.0 (0.0)	0.0 (0.0)	0.0 (0.0)	0.0 (0.0)	0.0 (0.0)	0.0 (0.0)	0.9 (2.3)	5.9 (15)
Average precipitation days (≥ 0.01 in)	10.3	9.7	11.5	11.2	12.3	12.8	13.7	12.8	11.1	8.8	9.1	10.8	134.1
Average snowy days (≥ 0.1 in)	1.0	0.7	0.2	0.0	0.0	0.0	0.0	0.0	0.0	0.0	0.0	0.3	2.2
Source: NOAA

== Demographics ==
Historical population
Census	Pop.	Note	%±
1900	918		—
1910	1,902		107.2%
1920	2,363		24.2%
1930	3,668		55.2%
1940	4,478		22.1%
1950	4,379		−2.2%
1960	4,197		−4.2%
1970	3,357		−20.0%
1980	3,275		−2.4%
1990	3,384		3.3%
2000	4,116		21.6%
2010	4,245		3.1%
2020	4,382		3.2%
2022 (est.)	4,280	▼	−2.3%
U.S. Decennial Census

=== 2020 census ===
As of the 2020 census, North Wilkesboro had a population of 4,382. The median age was 40.1 years. 22.2% of residents were under the age of 18 and 18.7% of residents were 65 years of age or older. For every 100 females there were 100.0 males, and for every 100 females age 18 and over there were 98.9 males age 18 and over.

95.8% of residents lived in urban areas, while 4.2% lived in rural areas.

There were 1,718 households in North Wilkesboro, of which 29.8% had children under the age of 18 living in them. Of all households, 32.5% were married-couple households, 22.5% were households with a male householder and no spouse or partner present, and 37.5% were households with a female householder and no spouse or partner present. About 38.3% of all households were made up of individuals and 15.7% had someone living alone who was 65 years of age or older.

There were 1,941 housing units, of which 11.5% were vacant. The homeowner vacancy rate was 1.6% and the rental vacancy rate was 9.4%.

Racial composition as of the 2020 census
Race	Number	Percent
White	3,096	70.7%
Black or African American	599	13.7%
American Indian and Alaska Native	31	0.7%
Asian	24	0.5%
Native Hawaiian and Other Pacific Islander	0	0.0%
Some other race	379	8.6%
Two or more races	253	5.8%
Hispanic or Latino (of any race)	561	12.8%

=== Income and poverty ===
The average median household income for the town was $30,114. About 29.3% of residents were at or below the poverty line.

=== 2000 census ===
As of the census of 2000, there were 4,116 people, 1,639 households, and 942 families residing in the town. The population density was 803.9 inhabitants per square mile (310.4/km^{2}). There were 1,837 housing units at an average density of 358.8 per square mile (138.5/km^{2}). The racial makeup of the town was 74.47% White, 17.90% African American, 0.36% Native American, 0.73% Asian, 0.49% Pacific Islander, 4.25% from other races, and 1.80% from two or more races. Hispanic or Latino of any race was 11.27% of the population.

There were 1,639 households, out of which 45.2% had children under the age of 18 living with them, 38.1% were married couples living together, 15.1% had a female householder with no husband present, and 42.5% were non-families. 39.3% of all households were made up of individuals, and 17.3% had someone living alone who was 65 years of age or older. The average household size was 2.25 and the average family size was 3.01.

In the town, the population was spread out, with 23.7% under the age of 18, 10.0% from 18 to 24, 29.0% from 25 to 44, 20.5% from 45 to 64, and 16.8% who were 65 years of age or older. The median age was 36 years. For every 100 females, there were 98.7 males. For every 100 females age 18 and over, there were 97.0 males.

The per capita income for the town was $14,594. About 21.8% of families and 13.2% of the population were below the poverty line, including 3.2% of those under age 18 and 2.2% of those age 65 or over.

== Notable people ==
- Daniel Boone, famed explorer and pioneer, lived for several years in the area where North Wilkesboro is located before moving west to Kentucky
- Robert Byrd, U.S. Senator from West Virginia from 1959 to 2010, making him the longest-serving Senator in American history
- Dean Combs, former NASCAR driver
- Zach Galifianakis, American actor and comedian, was born in North Wilkesboro
- Deneen Graham, first African-American to win the Miss North Carolina beauty pageant
- Gladys Gunzer, noted American medalist and sculptor
- Jimmy Pardue, former NASCAR driver
- Harry Pearson, journalist, audio reviewer, and publisher who founded The Absolute Sound magazine
- Shirrel Rhoades, writer, publisher, film critic, museum president, and former college professor
- John Swofford, commissioner of the Atlantic Coast Conference and younger brother of William Swofford
- William Swofford, singer who scored two Billboard Top 10 hits in 1969 with "Good Morning Starshine" and "Jean" under his middle name, Oliver
