= Elkin City Schools =

School district in North Carolina, United States

Location
- Elkin, North Carolina United States

District information
- Grades: Preschool – high school (PK–12)
- Superintendent: Dr. Myra cox
- Accreditations: Southern Association of Colleges and Schools
- Schools: 3
- Budget: $ 12,046,000
- NCES District ID: 3701380

Students and staff
- Students: 1,217
- Teachers: 87.14 (on FTE basis)
- Staff: 79.10 (on FTE basis)
- Student–teacher ratio: 13.97:1

Other information
- Website: www.elkin.k12.nc.us

The Elkin City Schools system is a PK–12 graded school district located in the town of Elkin, North Carolina which lies on the border of Wilkes and Surry counties. The three schools in the district serve 1,217 students as of 2010–11.

== History ==
The history of public education in Elkin really began shortly after the state passed its first common school law in 1839. The state was then divided into several school districts. The Elkin City Schools system was established by the North Carolina General Assembly on March 25, 1947.

== Student demographics ==
For the 2010–11 school year, Elkin City Schools had a total population of 1,217 students and 87.14 teachers on a (FTE) basis. This produced a student-teacher ratio of 13.97:1. That same year, out of the student total, the gender ratio was 52% male to 48% female. The demographic group makeup was: White, 77%; Hispanic, 16%; Black, 4%; Asian/Pacific Islander, 1%; and American Indian, 0% (two or more races: 2%). For the same school year, 40.95% of the students received free and reduced-cost lunches.

== Governance and funding ==
The primary governing body of Elkin City Schools follows a council–manager government format with a five-member Board of Education appointing a Superintendent to run the day-to-day operations of the system. Elkin City Schools currently resides in the North Carolina State Board of Education's Seventh District.

=== Board of education ===
A five-member board of education governs the Elkin City Schools system. The current members are: Richard Brinegar (chairman), Ralph Beshears, Judy Walker, Frank Beals, and Dr. Will Ballard.

=== Superintendent ===
The current Superintendent of Elkin City Schools is Dr. Myra S. Cox.

=== Funding ===
Public school districts in North Carolina do not have their own taxation authority, they are fiscally dependent on the State and their respective county Board of Commissioners. The county Boards of Commissioners vote on funding levels proposed by the school system. The majority of the funding comes from State sources.

== Schools ==
The Elkin City Schools system has three schools ranging from pre-kindergarten to twelfth grade: Elkin Elementary School, Elkin Middle School and Elkin High School.

There are no charter schools within the city of Elkin. Charter schools that serve the citizens of Elkin include: Bridges Charter School in State Road, North Carolina in Wilkes County

== Athletics ==
The schools in the district are members of the North Carolina High School Athletic Association. Elkin High School is a 1A school in the Mountain Valley Conference.

== Notable alumni ==
- Barney Hall ’50, American sports commentator
- Jeff Hayes ‘78, professional football player
- James A. Harrell III ‘93, North Carolina House of Representatives
- Tyler Sanborn ‘06, professional basketball player

== See also ==
- Wilkes County Schools (North Carolina) also serves some residents of Elkin.
- List of school districts in North Carolina
