= Benjamin Hubbard House =

Historic house in North Carolina, United States

- U.S. National Register of Historic Places
- Location within North Carolina Location within the United States
- Location: US 18 on the N., one mile E. of NC 1106, near Moravian Falls, North Carolina
- Coordinates: 36°5′28″N 81°12′26″W
- Area: 22.6 acres (9.1 ha)
- Built: 1778, 1790s, 1847, c. 1870
- Architectural style: V-notch log house, barn
- NRHP reference No.: 08001390
- Added to NRHP: January 29, 2009

Benjamin Hubbard House is a historic home located near Moravian Falls, North Carolina in Wilkes County. The original section was built in 1778, and is a single-pen, side-gabled log house with a hall and parlor plan. Frame additions were made to the house in the 1790s and about 1870. Also on the property is the contributing two-story, log bank barn, dating to 1846.

It was listed on the National Register of Historic Places in 2009.
