= John Swofford =

American football player and administrator (born 1948)

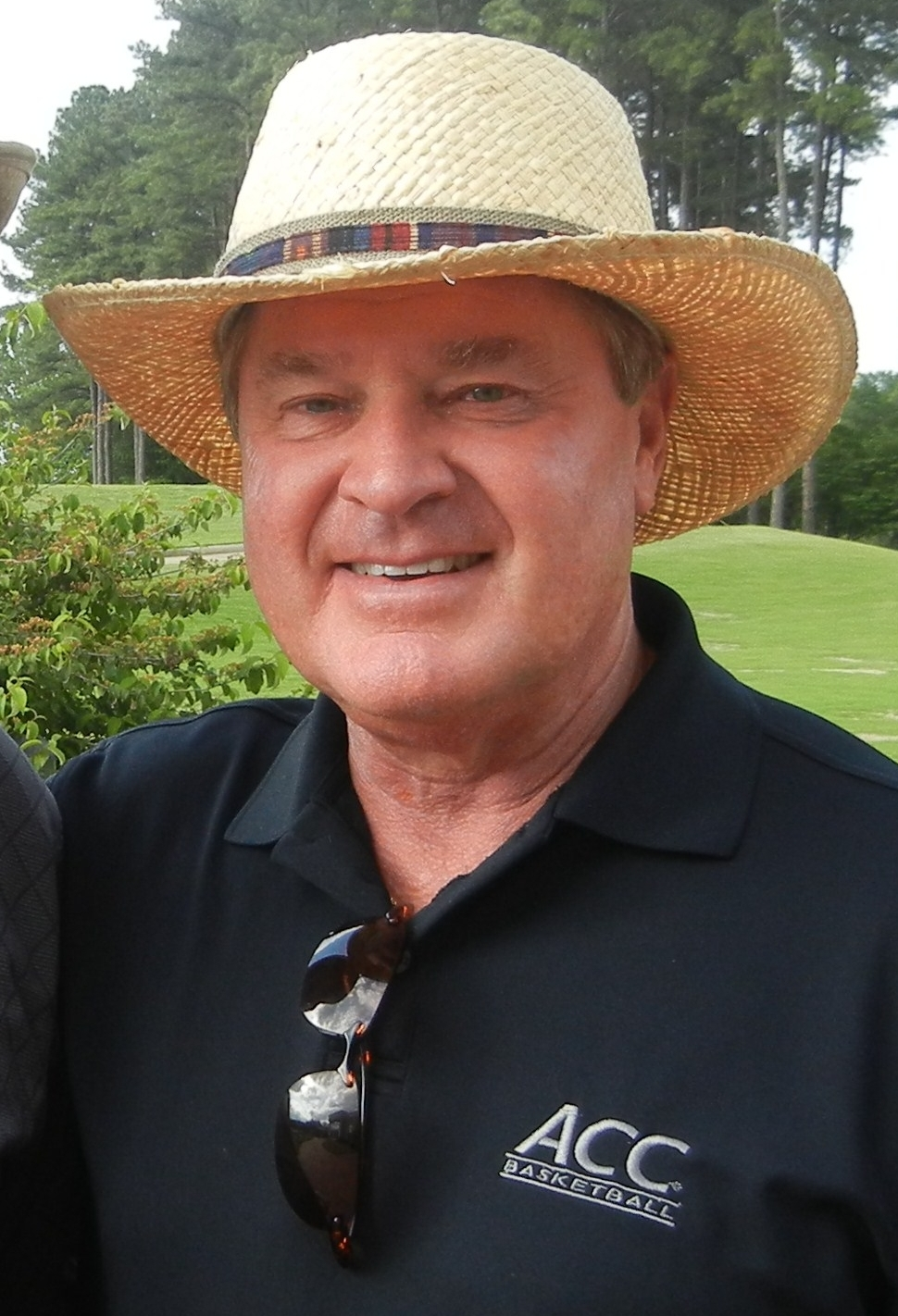
- Swofford in 2011

Biographical details
- Born: December 6, 1948 (age 77); North Wilkesboro, North Carolina, U.S.

Playing career
- 1969–1971: North Carolina
- Positions: Quarterback, defensive back

Administrative career (AD unless noted)
- 1980–1997: North Carolina
- 1997–2021: ACC (commissioner)

John Douglas Swofford (born December 6, 1948) is an American former college athletics administrator. He served as the athletic director at the University of North Carolina at Chapel Hill from 1980 to 1997 and as the commissioner of the Atlantic Coast Conference (ACC) from 1997 to 2021.

== Early life and education ==
Swofford was born on December 6, 1948, in North Wilkesboro, North Carolina, in the foothills of the Blue Ridge Mountains. While at Wilkes Central High School, he played as a quarterback for the Wilkes Central Eagles football team and was twice selected to the all-state football team. He was awarded a prestigious Morehead Scholarship to attend the University of North Carolina at Chapel Hill in 1967, where he was part of Bill Dooley's first football recruiting class. He played quarterback and defensive back from 1969 to 1971. He earned a master's degree in sports management from Ohio University in 1973.

== Career ==
Swofford began his first job as ticket manager and assistant director of athletic facilities at the University of Virginia in 1973, where he worked under athletic director Gene Corrigan. He returned to North Carolina in 1976. In 1980, he was promoted internally to the position of athletic director to replace Bill Cobey who had left for political ambitions. Dick Baddour succeeded him as North Carolina's athletic director in 1997.

On July 1, 1997, Swofford was named the fourth commissioner of the Atlantic Coast Conference (ACC), succeeding Gene Corrigan.

During his tenure he has doubled the ACC's annual revenue, served as Chairman of the Bowl Championship Series in college football in 2000 and 2001, and expanded the ACC from nine teams to 15, adding Boston College, Virginia Tech, the University of Miami, the University of Pittsburgh, Syracuse University, the University of Notre Dame, and the University of Louisville by 2014.

He was instrumental in starting the ACC–Big Ten Challenge and the launch of the ACC Network. ACC programs won 92 national titles in 19 sports while he was commissioner. After creating the most lucrative ACC Media deal with ESPN, Swofford received media rights from each ACC University. With a vote from all of the ACC Presidents, led by Jim Clements of Clemson, the ACC announced the launch of the ACC Network on ESPN.

In June 2020, Swofford announced via a press release that he will retire as the president of the ACC in June 2021.

== Awards and honors ==
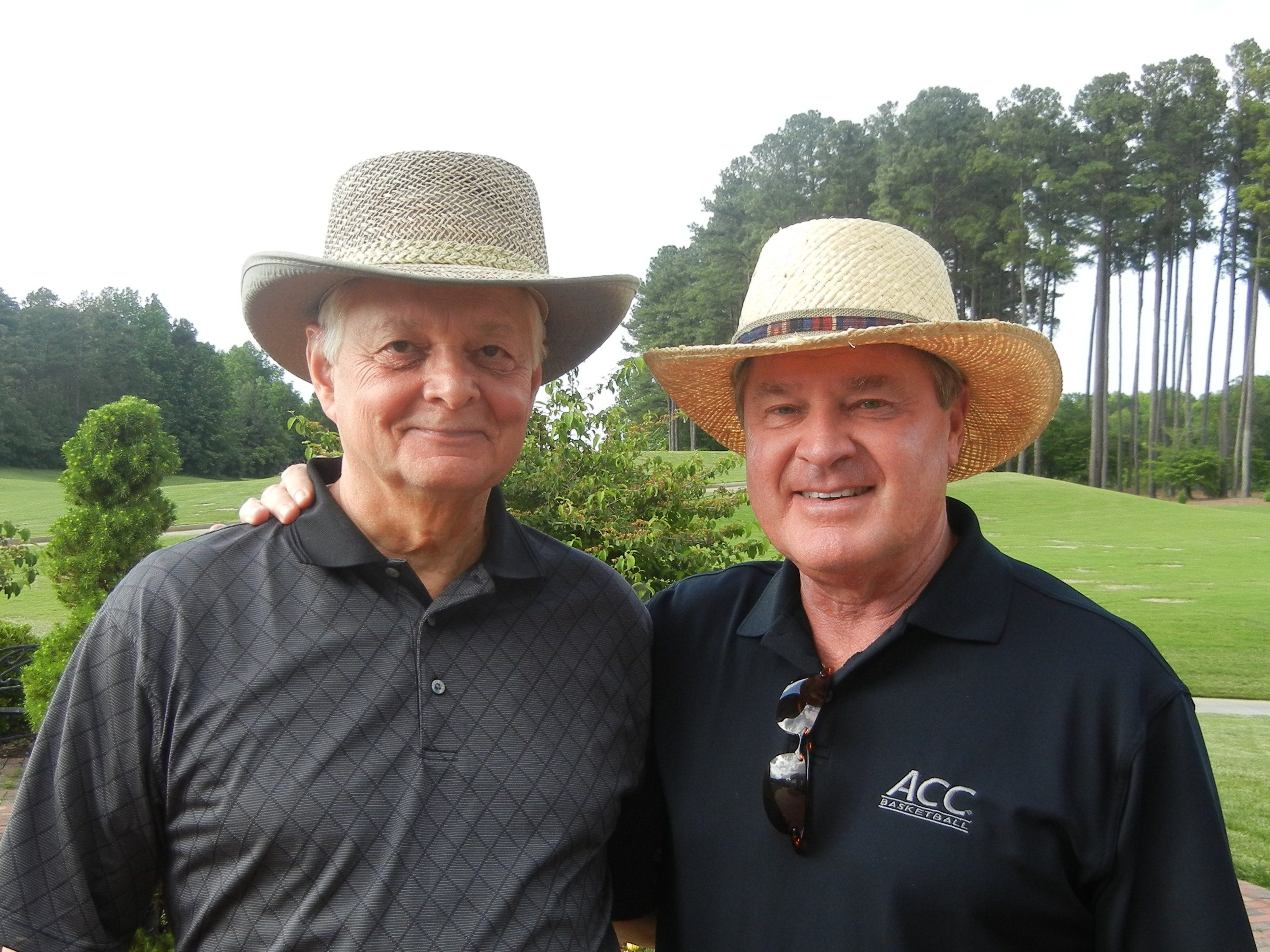
Swofford (right) with Ken Haines

Swofford has been elected to the North Carolina High School Athletic Association Hall of Fame in 2001, the North Carolina Sports Hall of Fame in 2009, and Wilkes County NC Hall of Fame in 2014.

Swofford received the Homer Rice award in 2005 and the Corbett Award in 2011.

== Personal life ==
Swofford and his wife, Nora, live in Greensboro, North Carolina and they have three children. Swofford is the younger brother of William Oliver Swofford (1945–2000), a pop singer professionally known as Oliver who performed from the late 1960s through the late 1970s.
