= Paw Creek (Charlotte neighborhood) =

- Neighborhood / Township
- Nickname: "Tank Town"
- Location within North Carolina
- Coordinates: 35.2748624°N 80.9384064°W
- Country: United States
- State: North Carolina
- County: Mecklenburg County
- City: Charlotte
- Council District: 2
- Annexed: 1979–Ongoing

Government
  - City Council: Malcolm Graham
- Elevation: 768 ft (234 m)
- Time zone: UTC-5 (Eastern (EST))
- ZIP code: 28130, 28214
- Area codes: 704, 980
- GNIS feature ID: 991951

Paw Creek is primarily considered to be a community and neighborhood in the northwest part of Mecklenburg County in North Carolina. It is generally defined geographically by the original boundaries of Paw Creek Township. Most of Paw Creek is within the city limits of Charlotte but the areas that have not yet been annexed are also recognized as a Township of North Carolina.

== History ==
The Paw Creek community derives its name from the small creek bearing the same name.

Also located in the area was the Thrift community, which was centered at Old Mount Holly Road and Freedom Drive. The community was listed on state maps up to the 1980s, when the area was annexed into Charlotte.

== Libraries ==
Paw Creek is served by a branch of the Public Library of Charlotte and Mecklenburg County. The library is located on Hoyt Galvin Way, near the intersection of Brookshire Boulevard and Rozzelles Ferry Road.

== Infrastructure ==
=== Main thoroughfares ===
- Brookshire Boulevard (NC 16)
- Freedom Drive / Mount Holly Road (NC 27)
- Senator W. Craig Lawing Freeway (I-485)

=== Mass transit ===
The Charlotte Area Transit System (CATS) offers local bus service in the area.

=== Utilities ===
Water and Trash pick-up is mostly serviced by the city of Charlotte, though third-party companies do service some developments in the area. Electricity is provided by Duke Energy, which holds a monopoly. Natural gas is provided by Piedmont Natural Gas, which holds a monopoly. Data/Telephone/Television service is all offered by AT&T and Time Warner Cable.

== See also ==
- Charlotte, North Carolina
- Mountain Island Lake
