= Cricket, North Carolina =

- CDP
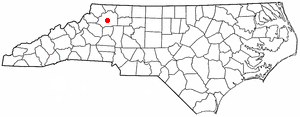
- Location of Cricket, North Carolina
- Coordinates: 36°10′08″N 81°11′36″W
- Country: United States
- State: North Carolina
- County: Wilkes

Area
  - Total: 3.54 sq mi (9.16 km^{2})
  - Land: 3.54 sq mi (9.16 km^{2})
  - Water: 0 sq mi (0.00 km^{2})
- Elevation: 1,263 ft (385 m)

Population (2020)
  - Total: 1,966
  - Density: 555.9/sq mi (214.62/km^{2})
- Time zone: UTC-5 (Eastern (EST))
  - Summer (DST): UTC-4 (EDT)
- ZIP code: 28659
- Area code: 336
- FIPS code: 37-15440
- GNIS feature ID: 2402804

Cricket is a census-designated place (CDP) located between Wilkesboro and North Wilkesboro in Wilkes County, North Carolina, United States. As of the 2020 census, Cricket had a population of 1,966.

== Geography ==
According to the United States Census Bureau, the CDP has a total area of 4.0 square miles (10 km^{2}), all land. Cricket has many rolling hills, similar to the surrounding townships.

== Demographics ==
Historical population
Census	Pop.	Note	%±
2020	1,966		—
U.S. Decennial Census

=== 2020 census ===
As of the 2020 census, Cricket had a population of 1,966. The median age was 45.4 years. 22.8% of residents were under the age of 18 and 25.7% of residents were 65 years of age or older. For every 100 females there were 97.0 males, and for every 100 females age 18 and over there were 90.5 males age 18 and over.

100.0% of residents lived in urban areas, while 0.0% lived in rural areas.

There were 762 households in Cricket, of which 32.4% had children under the age of 18 living in them. Of all households, 43.3% were married-couple households, 17.7% were households with a male householder and no spouse or partner present, and 32.9% were households with a female householder and no spouse or partner present. About 32.0% of all households were made up of individuals and 17.8% had someone living alone who was 65 years of age or older.

There were 873 housing units, of which 12.7% were vacant. The homeowner vacancy rate was 2.8% and the rental vacancy rate was 7.9%.

Racial composition as of the 2020 census
Race	Number	Percent
White	1,504	76.5%
Black or African American	42	2.1%
American Indian and Alaska Native	8	0.4%
Asian	5	0.3%
Native Hawaiian and Other Pacific Islander	0	0.0%
Some other race	208	10.6%
Two or more races	199	10.1%
Hispanic or Latino (of any race)	382	19.4%

=== 2000 census ===
As of the census of 2000, there were 2,053 people, 862 households, and 581 families residing in the CDP. The population density was 514.7 inhabitants per square mile (198.7/km^{2}). There were 951 housing units at an average density of 238.4 per square mile (92.0/km^{2}). The racial makeup of the CDP was 92.30% White, 0.34% African American, 0.15% Native American, 0.10% Asian, 6.87% from other races, and 0.24% from two or more races. Hispanic or Latino of any race were 6.81% of the population.

There were 862 households, out of which 25.8% had children under the age of 18 living with them, 51.6% were married couples living together, 9.2% had a female householder with no husband present, and 32.5% were non-families. 28.9% of all households were made up of individuals, and 11.5% had someone living alone who was 65 years of age or older. The average household size was 2.38 and the average family size was 2.85.

In the CDP, the population was spread out, with 19.6% under the age of 18, 9.8% from 18 to 24, 30.2% from 25 to 44, 24.4% from 45 to 64, and 16.0% who were 65 years of age or older. The median age was 38 years. For every 100 females, there were 104.5 males. For every 100 females age 18 and over, there were 107.2 males.

The median income for a household in the CDP was $27,017, and the median income for a family was $33,148. Males had a median income of $25,720 versus $16,822 for females. The per capita income for the CDP was $12,989. About 9.7% of families and 13.4% of the population were below the poverty line, including 21.5% of those under age 18 and 5.7% of those age 65 or over.

== Transportation ==
There are no major roads in Cricket, however, Cricket has previously had NC-16, NC-60, as well as US-421 run through what is now the main road, Boone Trail. Along this road is a non-denominational church Celebration Church as well as Harmony Baptist Church.

While there is no scheduled transportation in Cricket, one can request for the Wilkes Transportation Authority to pick up or drop off customers for $4-$5.
