= Parsonsville, North Carolina =

Unincorporated community in North Carolina, US

Coordinates: 36°12′58″N 81°21′44″W

Parsonsville is an unincorporated community in Wilkes County, North Carolina, United States, close to North Wilkesboro. NASCAR legend Benny Parsons was raised in the area.

It was named for the Parsons family of settlers.
