= Bobby Billings =

American musician, singer and songwriter

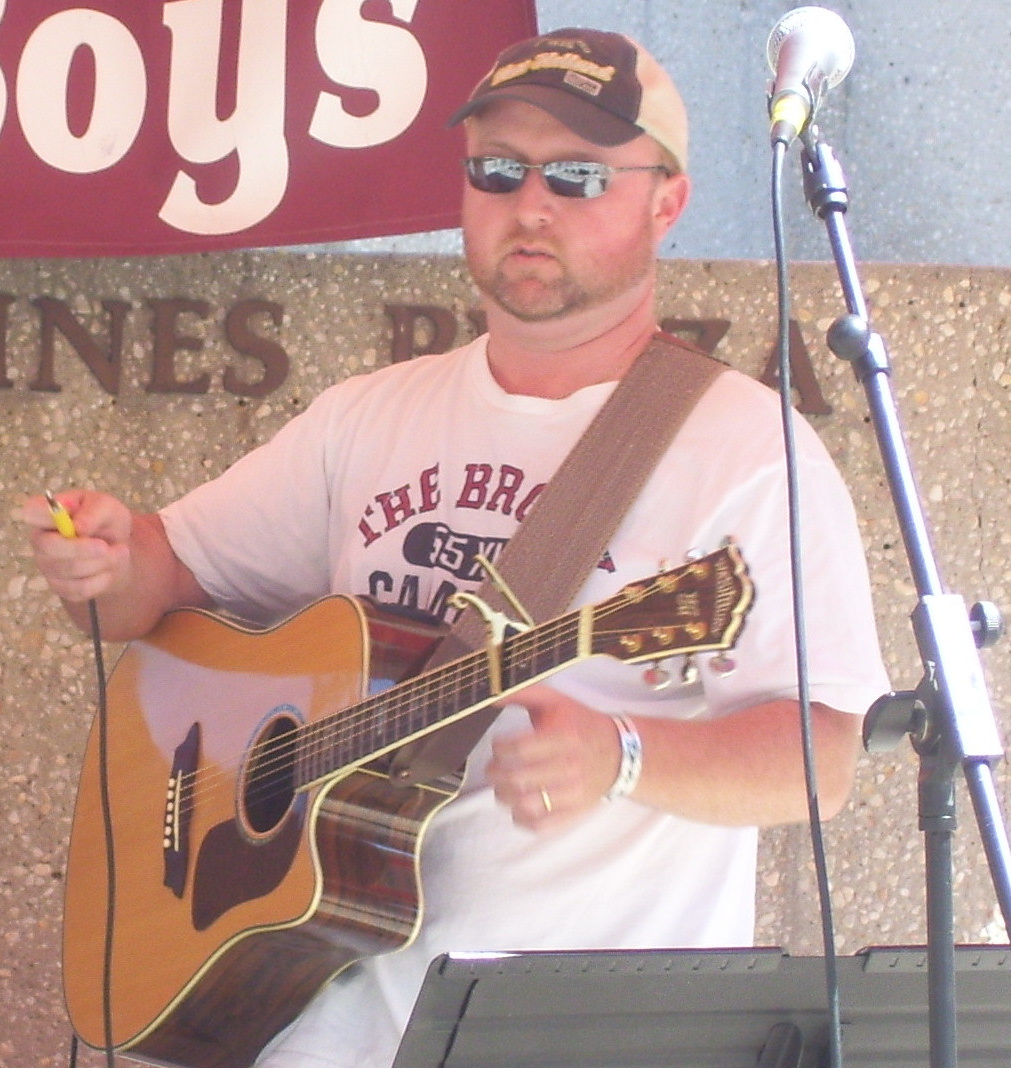

Background information
- Birth name: Bobby G Billings
- Born: February 12, 1975 (age 50)
- Origin: Millers Creek, North Carolina
- Genres: Rock, country, gospel
- Occupation(s): Singer-songwriter, elementary school teacher
- Instrument(s): Guitar, vocals, keyboard
- Years active: 2000–present

Bobby Billings (born February 12, 1975) is an American musician, singer and songwriter.

== Early life ==
Billings grew up in a musical family in the foothills of North Carolina. While the area is known for its bluegrass roots, he took the rock and country route. He began playing the piano at age eight, but was soon influenced by his uncle's rock band and became obsessed with learning to play guitar and drums. At age sixteen, he got his first guitar and immediately began to write songs. At 18, a friend asked Billings to play one of his songs and sing at his wedding, and he reluctantly agreed. But soon after, he'd realized that this would be his new passion in life.

== Career ==
In 1998, with the encouragement of family and friends, Billings produced and recorded a demo cassette titled The Further I Go, The More I See. With demo tapes in hand, he decided to try his luck in Nashville as a songwriter. After a two-week visit, he headed home, discouraged. After another year of writing and honing his craft, he returned. This time, his visit was somewhat successful. He signed a single song publishing deal with Ralph D. Johnson of Wedge Records.

Over the next several years, Billings continued to write and perform music. In the summer of 2009, he recorded a new patriotic song that he co-wrote with friend Alan Gragg. The song "21 GUNS (Fallen Soldier)" began as a poem that Gragg had written. It reminded Billings of his late friend Seth Hildreth, who was killed in Iraq in 2006. He took the poem, made some revisions and turned it into a song.

The song began to get radio play locally along with radio and newspaper interviews. Billings was soon contacted for permission to use the song at a military banquet in North Dakota hosted by Tweed Roosevelt, great-grandson of President Theodore Roosevelt. The song is featured on several military websites, such as USA Patriotism and Bob Calvert's website thankyouforyourservice.us. He received a letter of recognition from North Carolina Senator Kay Hagan.

On October 12, 2009, "21 GUNS (Fallen Soldier Song)" debuted on the TOP 20 on Demand chart on Clear Channel Communications. On November 4, 2009, it became the number one song on the Top 20 on Demand chart in the US and remained for over two weeks. The song appeared on the Independent Music Network's Mainstream Chart on December 9, 2009 and stayed in the Top 30 for over four months.

Billings continues to write material and perform shows in the Carolinas. In 2011, he performed at MerleFest in his home town of Wilkesboro, North Carolina.
