= Moravian Falls =

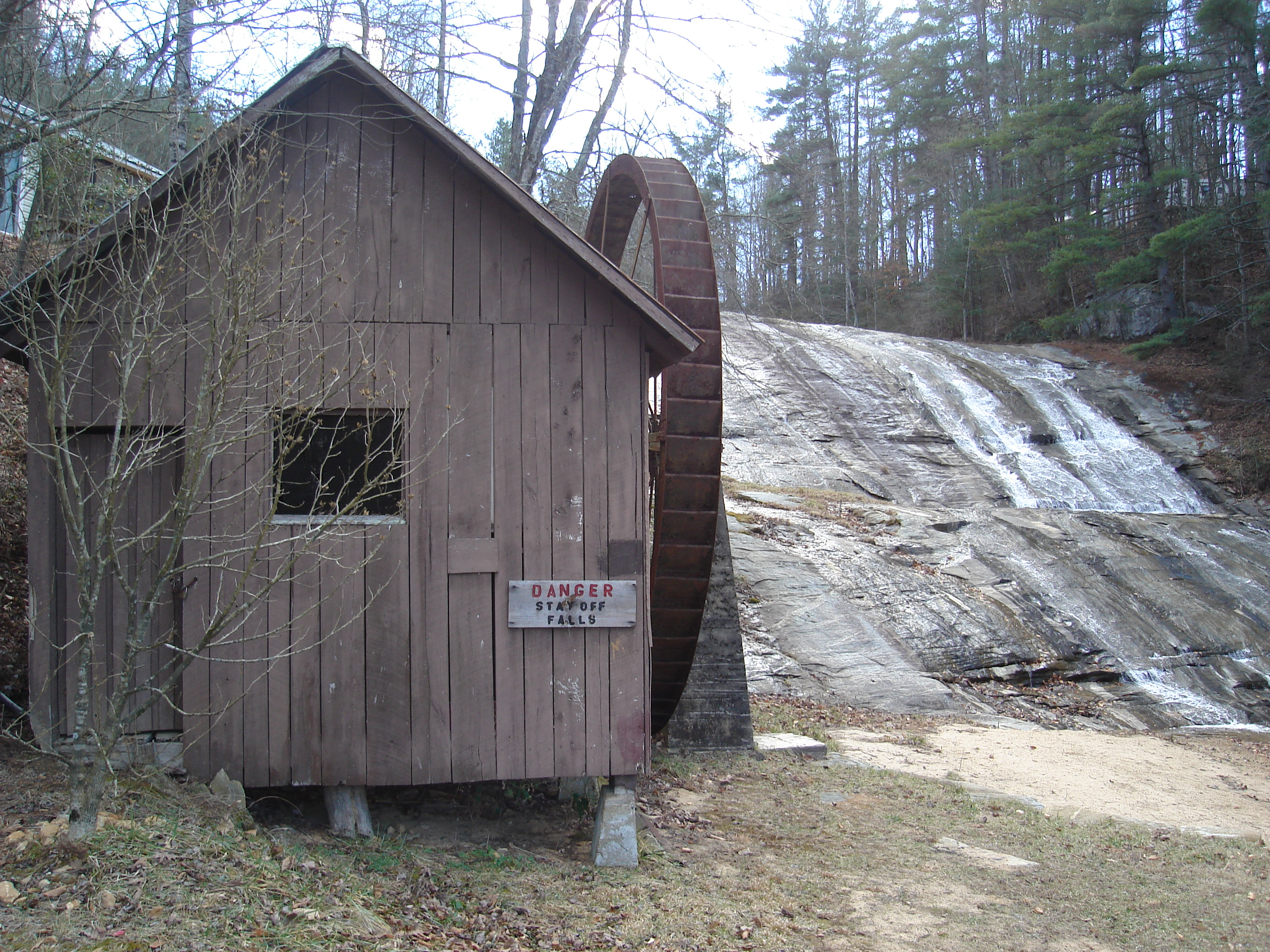
- Moravian Falls, Moravian Falls, NC
- Interactive map of Moravian Falls
- Location: Moravian Falls Campground, Moravian Falls, Wilkes County, in North Carolina
- Coordinates: 36.086286°N 81.190295°W
- Type: Cascade and Slide
- Total height: 42 ft (13 m)

Moravian Falls is a waterfall in Wilkes County, North Carolina.

== Geology ==
The waterfall is located on Moravian Creek, where it flows over a large bedrock to a lower plunge pool.

== Natural history ==
The falls is privately owned by a campground who has built a reproduction of an old mill next to the falls.

== Visiting the falls ==
From US Highway 421, exit onto NC Highway 18 and NC Highway 16. Follow NC 18/16 south to the town of Moravian Falls, bearing right to stay on NC 18. After 0.4 miles, turn left onto Falls Rd. and go 0.5 miles to a view of the falls on the left.

The falls is located on the grounds of the Moravian Falls Campground, whose owners have allowed the public to access the falls (so long as they ask permission at the inside the camp store before walking to the falls, which are viewable from the road (please do not slow down or block traffic to view them).

Visitors are required to obey all rules at the campground concerning the Falls, and are not allowed to swim near or above the falls.

== Nearby falls ==
- Boone Falls
- Crystal Falls
- Wingler Creek Falls
- Gilbreath Falls
- Carter Falls
- North Deep Creek Falls
