= Ronda, North Carolina =

- Town
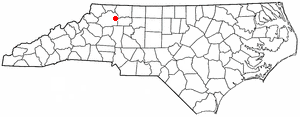
- Location of Ronda, North Carolina
- Coordinates: 36°13′18″N 80°56′36″W
- Country: United States
- State: North Carolina
- County: Wilkes
- Incorporated: 1907

Area
  - Total: 1.08 sq mi (2.81 km^{2})
  - Land: 1.08 sq mi (2.81 km^{2})
  - Water: 0 sq mi (0.00 km^{2})
- Elevation: 1,034 ft (315 m)

Population (2020)
  - Total: 438
  - Density: 400/sq mi (156/km^{2})
- Time zone: UTC-5 (Eastern (EST))
  - Summer (DST): UTC-4 (EDT)
- ZIP code: 28670
- Area code: 336
- FIPS code: 37-57700
- GNIS feature ID: 2407238
- Website: https://www.townofronda.org/

Ronda is a town in Wilkes County, North Carolina, United States. The population was 417 at the 2010 census, and 413 at the 2020 census. Ronda was named after a nearby estate called "Roundabout", which was the residence of Benjamin Cleveland, a locally prominent planter and a colonel in the North Carolina militia during the Revolutionary War. The town is home to East Wilkes High School, one of Wilkes County's five public high schools.

Claymont Hill was listed on the National Register of Historic Places in 1985.

Ronda was the home of NASCAR pioneer and Hall of Famer Junior Johnson.

On September 8, 2026, the board of commissioners voted to dissolve the town charter.

== Geography ==
According to the United States Census Bureau, the town has a total area of 1.1 square miles (2.8 km^{2}), all land. Ronda is located on the north bank of the Yadkin River, Wilkes County's largest river and one of the major rivers of North Carolina's Piedmont region.

== Demographics ==
Historical population
Census	Pop.	Note	%±
1930	344		—
1940	379		10.2%
1950	545		43.8%
1960	510		−6.4%
1970	465		−8.8%
1980	457		−1.7%
1990	367		−19.7%
2000	460		25.3%
2010	417		−9.3%
2020	438		5.0%
U.S. Decennial Census

As of the census of 2000, there were 560 people, 228 households, and 182 families residing in the town. The population density was 426.8 inhabitants per square mile (164.8/km^{2}). There were 251 housing units at an average density of 186.5 per square mile (72.0/km^{2}). The racial makeup of the town was 98.26% White, 1.74% from other races. Hispanic or Latino of any race were 4.57% of the population.

There were 228 households, out of which 34.3% had children under the age of 18 living with them, 64.6% were married couples living together, 7.3% had a female householder with no husband present, and 25.8% were non-families. 23.6% of all households were made up of individuals, and 11.2% had someone living alone who was 65 years of age or older. The average household size was 2.58 and the average family size was 3.05.

In the town, the population was spread out, with 23.7% under the age of 18, 8.5% from 18 to 24, 31.3% from 25 to 44, 23.9% from 45 to 64, and 12.6% who were 65 years of age or older. The median age was 36 years. For every 100 females, there were 98.3 males. For every 100 females age 18 and over, there were 93.9 males.

The median income for a household in the town was $31,875, and the median income for a family was $34,773. Males had a median income of $22,917 versus $19,333 for females. The per capita income for the town was $15,397. About 8.8% of families and 11.7% of the population were below the poverty line, including 19.3% of those under age 18 and 9.4% of those age 65 or over.
