= Chronicle, North Carolina =

Chronicle
- Unincorporated town
- Location within the state of North Carolina
- Coordinates: 35°33′31.48″N 81°03′50.28″W
- Country: United States
- State: North Carolina
- County: Catawba
- Time zone: UTC-5 (Eastern (EST))
  - Summer (DST): UTC-4 (EDT)
- ZIP code: 28650, 28673
- Area codes: 704, 828
- GNIS feature ID: 987962

Chronicle, sometimes called Killian Crossroads, is an unincorporated town in Catawba County, North Carolina, United States.

== History ==
Chronicle is said to be named after Major William Chronicle, a Revolutionary War soldier who died at the Battle of Kings Mountain while leading a regiment of soldiers from Lincoln County (now Lincoln and Catawba Counties).

The first United States Post Office founded to service Chronicle was opened in Lincoln County, just over the border from Catawba in 1851. It was closed in 1866 and replaced with a location in Catawba County on what is now East Maiden Road in 1869. Though Chronicle was never an incorporated town, it elected several mayors in the late 1800s and early 1900s. In 2022, Mountain Creek Park opened in the northern part of Chronicle.

In 2025, The Chronicle Chronicle, a hyperlocal newspaper, launched to cover the area.

== Geography ==
Chronicle is centered around Killian Crossroads (the intersection of NC-16 Business and NC-150). It encompasses the nearby area, including landmarks such as Anderson Mountain and Mountain Creek Park, the latter of which is part of the Catawba County Park system. Chronicle contains numerous small creeks and lakes. It borders the south fork of Mountain Creek and parts of Lake Norman. Neighboring communities include Denver to the south and Terrell to the northeast. Historically, Chronicle has extended into parts of Lincoln County that are now considered to be Denver. Mailing addresses in Chronicle are usually Maiden, Denver, or Sherrills Ford.
