= Hays, North Carolina =

- CDP
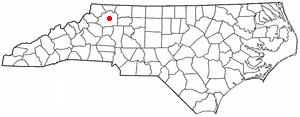
- Location of Hays, North Carolina
- Coordinates: 36°15′17″N 81°07′50″W
- Country: United States
- State: North Carolina
- County: Wilkes

Area
  - Total: 6.16 sq mi (15.95 km^{2})
  - Land: 6.16 sq mi (15.95 km^{2})
  - Water: 0 sq mi (0.00 km^{2})
- Elevation: 1,339 ft (408 m)

Population (2020)
  - Total: 1,595
  - Density: 260/sq mi (100/km^{2})
- Time zone: UTC-5 (Eastern (EST))
  - Summer (DST): UTC-4 (EDT)
- ZIP code: 28635
- Area code: 336
- FIPS code: 37-30340
- GNIS feature ID: 2402572

Hays is a census-designated place (CDP) in Wilkes County, North Carolina, United States. The population was 1,595 at the 2020 census. North Wilkes High School, one of Wilkes County's four public high schools, is located in Hays.

== Geography ==
According to the United States Census Bureau, the CDP has a total area of 6.1 square miles (16 km^{2}), all land.

== Demographics ==
Historical population
Census	Pop.	Note	%±
2020	1,595		—
U.S. Decennial Census

=== 2020 census ===
As of the 2020 census, Hays had a population of 1,595. The median age was 46.2 years. 20.6% of residents were under the age of 18 and 18.1% of residents were 65 years of age or older. For every 100 females there were 95.7 males, and for every 100 females age 18 and over there were 100.2 males age 18 and over.

0.0% of residents lived in urban areas, while 100.0% lived in rural areas.

There were 663 households in Hays, of which 29.3% had children under the age of 18 living in them. Of all households, 56.0% were married-couple households, 12.4% were households with a male householder and no spouse or partner present, and 25.8% were households with a female householder and no spouse or partner present. About 24.7% of all households were made up of individuals and 15.0% had someone living alone who was 65 years of age or older.

There were 732 housing units, of which 9.4% were vacant. The homeowner vacancy rate was 0.0% and the rental vacancy rate was 6.5%.

Racial composition as of the 2020 census
Race	Number	Percent
White	1,498	93.9%
Black or African American	15	0.9%
American Indian and Alaska Native	4	0.3%
Asian	0	0.0%
Native Hawaiian and Other Pacific Islander	0	0.0%
Some other race	30	1.9%
Two or more races	48	3.0%
Hispanic or Latino (of any race)	57	3.6%

=== 2000 census ===
As of the census of 2000, there were 1,731 people, 686 households, and 526 families residing in the CDP. The population density was 283.1 inhabitants per square mile (109.3/km^{2}). There were 729 housing units at an average density of 119.2 per square mile (46.0/km^{2}). The racial makeup of the CDP was 98.21% White, 0.52% African American, 0.23% Asian, 0.75% from other races, and 0.29% from two or more races. Hispanic or Latino of any race were 1.04% of the population.

There were 686 households, out of which 34.3% had children under the age of 18 living with them, 62.8% were married couples living together, 9.3% had a female householder with no husband present, and 23.2% were non-families. 20.3% of all households were made up of individuals, and 8.0% had someone living alone who was 65 years of age or older. The average household size was 2.51 and the average family size was 2.88.

In the CDP, the population was spread out, with 23.2% under the age of 18, 8.1% from 18 to 24, 32.8% from 25 to 44, 24.6% from 45 to 64, and 11.4% who were 65 years of age or older. The median age was 37 years. For every 100 females, there were 96.5 males. For every 100 females age 18 and over, there were 96.5 males.

The median income for a household in the CDP was $37,642, and the median income for a family was $40,144. Males had a median income of $27,601 versus $21,520 for females. The per capita income for the CDP was $16,869. About 12.6% of families and 17.6% of the population were below the poverty line, including 29.2% of those under age 18 and 11.5% of those age 65 or over.
