= East Wilkes High School =

American public school in North Carolina

Location
- 13315 Elkin Hwy 268; Ronda, North Carolina 28670; United States
- Coordinates: 36°13′34″N 80°55′40″W

Information
- Type: Public
- Established: 1954 (72 years ago)
- CEEB code: 343400
- Principal: Dustin C. Webb
- Teaching staff: 28.46 (FTE)
- Grades: 9–12
- Enrollment: 469 (2024-2025)
- Student to teacher ratio: 16.48
- Colors: Red, white, and black
- Athletics conference: 1-A; Mountain Valley Conference
- Mascot: Cardinal
- Yearbook: East Wind
- Website: ewhs.wilkescountyschools.org

East Wilkes High School is a class 1A public high school (grades 9–12) located in Ronda, North Carolina. It is a part of the Wilkes County Schools system. The school's enrollment typically runs from 500 to 600 students. The school serves the East District of Wilkes County, including the town of Ronda, the communities of Roaring River and Clingman, and portions of Elkin.

The original buildings once housed Ronda Elementary School, but were later converted into a high school after the consolidation of the Wilkes County School system in the 1950s resulted in the construction of several new schools in the area. A new academic building and cafeteria have been completed, while the new vocational building remains under construction.

== Academics ==
The school offers career preparation classes and college preparation classes. It offers honors-level mathematics, English, history, and science courses. East Wilkes also offers Advanced Placement courses for juniors and seniors, including AP English Language and Composition, AP English Literature and Composition. The language department offers courses in Spanish language. East Wilkes is fully accredited by the Southern Association of Colleges and Schools, also known as SACS.

== Athletics ==
East Wilkes High School supports varsity teams for the following sports: men's/women's basketball, football, men's baseball, wrestling, women's softball, women's volleyball, men's/women's soccer, men's/women's tennis, cross country, track and field, cheerleading, and golf. The school's mascot is the Cardinal. The school's colors are white, red, and black.

East Wilkes competes in the Northwest 1A Athletic Conference as part of the North Carolina High School Athletic Association.

State Championships

- Men's Cross Country Championship (2007)
- Women's 1600 Meter Champion (2007)
- Men's 4x8 Championship (2008)
- Women's 4x8 Championship (2008)
- Women's Dual-Team Tennis Championship (2008)
- Women's Tennis Individual Doubles Championship (2008)

== Notable alumni ==
- Eddie Settle, member of the North Carolina Senate
