= Moravian Falls, North Carolina =

- CDP
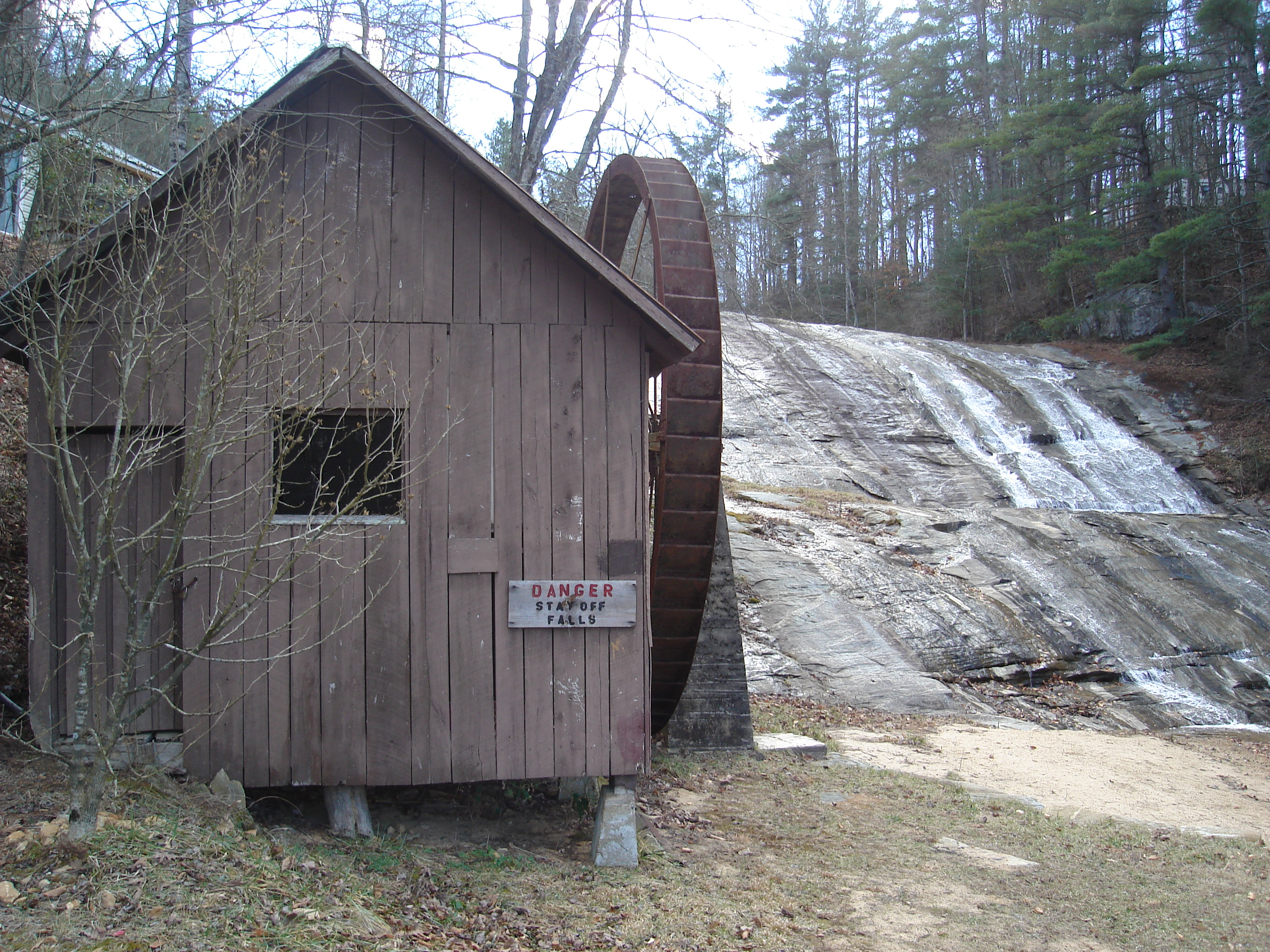
- The waterfall and pumphouse at Moravian Falls

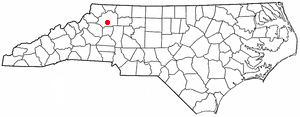
- Location of Moravian Falls, North Carolina
- Coordinates: 36°06′26″N 81°10′50″W
- Country: United States
- State: North Carolina
- County: Wilkes

Area
  - Total: 5.14 sq mi (13.32 km^{2})
  - Land: 5.14 sq mi (13.30 km^{2})
  - Water: 0.0077 sq mi (0.02 km^{2})
- Elevation: 1,178 ft (359 m)

Population (2020)
  - Total: 1,712
  - Density: 333.4/sq mi (128.72/km^{2})
- Time zone: UTC-5 (Eastern (EST))
  - Summer (DST): UTC-4 (EDT)
- ZIP code: 28654
- Area code: 336/743
- FIPS code: 37-44280
- GNIS feature ID: 2403307

Moravian Falls (formerly, Petersburg and Forks of the Road) is a census-designated place (CDP) in Wilkes County, North Carolina, United States. The population was 1,712 as of the 2020 census.

== Geography ==
According to the United States Census Bureau, the CDP has a total area of 5.1 square miles (13 km^{2}), of which, 5.1 square miles (13 km^{2}) is land and 0.20% is water. Moravian Falls is located in the foothills of the Brushy Mountains, which rise to the south of the community. Pores Knob, the highest point in the Brushy Mountains, is located in Moravian Falls.

== Climate ==
Moravian Falls has a humid subtropical climate (Cfa) and the hardiness zone is 7B. In Moravian Falls, the summers are warm and humid, the winters are cool, and it is wet and partly cloudy year round.

Average annual rainfall (49.7 inches) for the town falls just short of the typical average of the Southern Appalachian region (60.0+ inches). Moravian Falls averages roughly 6 inches of snow per year. The highest recorded temperature in Moravian Falls was 100 °F (38 °C) while the lowest recorded temperature was −10 °F (−23 °C).

Moravian Falls receives ample amounts of precipitation, with frequent thunderstorms in the spring and summer months; and rain, snow, sleet, and freezing rain all occur at times during the winter. Severe weather is not common in Moravian Falls but does occur. Tornadoes are rare, but severe thunderstorms can bring strong winds which can down trees and power lines, as well as cause hail. On October 23, 2017, a rare EF 1 tornado touched down in the community of Moravian Falls, before moving into the towns of Wilkesboro and North Wilkesboro, and then through the Mulberry, Fairplains, and Hays communities, causing significant damage.

Climate data for Moravian Falls, North Carolina
Month	Jan	Feb	Mar	Apr	May	Jun	Jul	Aug	Sep	Oct	Nov	Dec	Year
Record high °F (°C)	78.0 (25.6)	82.0 (27.8)	87.0 (30.6)	92.0 (33.3)	95.0 (35.0)	98.0 (36.7)	100.0 (37.8)	100.0 (37.8)	95.0 (35.0)	93.0 (33.9)	84.0 (28.9)	80.0 (26.7)	100.0 (37.8)
Mean daily maximum °F (°C)	47.9 (8.8)	51.8 (11.0)	60.0 (15.6)	69.3 (20.7)	76.9 (24.9)	84.5 (29.2)	87.3 (30.7)	85.9 (29.9)	79.6 (26.4)	70.3 (21.3)	60.8 (16.0)	50.2 (10.1)	68.8 (20.4)
Mean daily minimum °F (°C)	27.0 (−2.8)	29.4 (−1.4)	36.0 (2.2)	43.7 (6.5)	52.9 (11.6)	62.3 (16.8)	65.8 (18.8)	65.1 (18.4)	57.6 (14.2)	45.7 (7.6)	36.8 (2.7)	29.2 (−1.6)	46.0 (7.8)
Record low °F (°C)	−10 (−23)	−7.0 (−21.7)	1.0 (−17.2)	18.0 (−7.8)	27.0 (−2.8)	36.0 (2.2)	43.0 (6.1)	41.0 (5.0)	29.0 (−1.7)	15.0 (−9.4)	6.0 (−14.4)	−2.0 (−18.9)	−10.0 (−23.3)
Average precipitation inches (mm)	4.20 (107)	3.90 (99)	4.50 (114)	4.10 (104)	4.20 (107)	4.40 (112)	4.50 (114)	4.80 (122)	4.10 (104)	3.50 (89)	3.50 (89)	4.0 (100)	49.7 (1,260)
Average snowfall inches (cm)	2.01 (5.1)	2.01 (5.1)	.98 (2.5)	0.0 (0.0)	0.0 (0.0)	0.0 (0.0)	0.0 (0.0)	0.0 (0.0)	0.0 (0.0)	0.0 (0.0)	0.0 (0.0)	.98 (2.5)	5.9 (15)
Average precipitation days (≥ 0.01 in)	9.5	9.6	10.4	10.1	11.9	11.2	12.7	11.3	9.5	8.2	9.5	10.3	124.2
Average snowy days (≥ 0.1 in)	1	1	0.2	0.0	0.0	0.0	0.0	0.0	0.0	0.0	0.0	0.3	2.5

== Background ==
Moravian Falls takes its name from a waterfall in the foothills of the Brushy Mountains. The area was originally settled by the Owen family in about 1750. In 1754, the Moravian Church purchased approximately 9000 acres of land which now lies under the nearby W. Kerr Scott Dam and Reservoir. However, there is no record that the Moravians ever attempted to establish a settlement in the area during the 18th century. Today the waterfall is a local tourist attraction.

Beginning in the late 1800s and for several decades thereafter, Moravian Falls was an oddly significant publishing hub, with several local newspapers published there being distributed nationally and claiming circulations in the hundreds of thousands. The Yellow Jacket, the Fool-Killer, and the Lash were the leading papers, but more than a dozen were published in the tiny town. At its peak, the Yellow Jacket claimed a circulation of 1 million copies, though rivals estimated a number more like 250,000 — which was still more than twice the Sunday circulation of any other newspaper in the South.

Wilkes Central High School, and Central Wilkes Middle School, are located in Moravian Falls. The two schools are the largest and most ethnically diverse high school and middle school respectively in the Wilkes County public school system.

The Benjamin Hubbard House was listed on the National Register of Historic Places in 2009.

== Demographics ==
Historical population
Census	Pop.	Note	%±
2020	1,712		—
U.S. Decennial Census

=== 2020 census ===
Moravian Falls racial composition
Race	Number	Percentage
White (non-Hispanic)	1,313	72.66%
Black or African American (non-Hispanic)	75	4.16%
Native American	26	1.44%
Other/Mixed	14	0.78%
Hispanic or Latino	374	20.8%

As of the 2020 United States census, there were 1,802 people, 874 households, and 521 families residing in the CDP. The average household size was 2.06 and the average family size was 2.61.

The median income for a household in the CDP was $39,321. About 10.3% of the population were below the poverty line.

=== 2000 census ===
As of the census of 2000, there were 1,440 people, 600 households, and 415 families residing in the CDP. The population density was 283.0 inhabitants per square mile (109.3/km^{2}). There were 656 housing units at an average density of 128.9 per square mile (49.8/km^{2}). The racial makeup of the CDP was 89.58% White, 5.49% African American, 0.14% Asian, 3.47% from other races, and 1.32% from two or more races. Hispanic or Latino of any race were 7.15% of the population.

There were 600 households, out of which 26.2% had children under the age of 18 living with them, 55.5% were married couples living together, 10.2% had a female householder with no husband present, and 30.7% were non-families. 26.5% of all households were made up of individuals, and 7.7% had someone living alone who was 65 years of age or older. The average household size was 2.39 and the average family size was 2.86.

In the CDP, the population was spread out, with 22.0% under the age of 18, 9.1% from 18 to 24, 29.0% from 25 to 44, 25.8% from 45 to 64, and 14.1% who were 65 years of age or older. The median age was 38 years. For every 100 females, there were 97.8 males. For every 100 females age 18 and over, there were 97.7 males.

The median income for a household in the CDP was $36,607, and the median income for a family was $48,906. Males had a median income of $21,911 versus $24,013 for females. The per capita income for the CDP was $19,405. About 5.7% of families and 12.4% of the population were below the poverty line, including 18.1% of those under age 18 and 13.3% of those age 65 or over.
