= Mulberry, Wilkes County, North Carolina =

Mulberry, North Carolina
- CDP
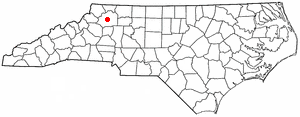
- Location of Mulberry, North Carolina
- Coordinates: 36°13′33″N 81°09′55″W
- County: Wilkes
- State: North Carolina
- Country: United States

Area
  - Total: 5.09 sq mi (13.19 km^{2})
  - Land: 5.09 sq mi (13.19 km^{2})
  - Water: 0 sq mi (0.00 km^{2})
- Elevation: 1,303 ft (397 m)

Population (2020)
  - Total: 2,275
  - Density: 446.6/sq mi (172.44/km^{2})
- Time zone: UTC-5 (Eastern (EST))
  - Summer (DST): UTC-4 (EDT)
- ZIP code: 28659
- Area code: 336
- FIPS code: 37-45560
- GNIS feature ID: 2403317

Mulberry is a census-designated place (CDP) in Wilkes County, North Carolina, United States. The population was 2,332 at the 2010 U.S. Census. The community was given its name by the first European pioneers to settle the area in the 1750s. These settlers called the region "Mulberry Fields", after the many mulberry trees in the area. Mulberry Creek, one of the largest streams in Wilkes County, takes its name from the community of Mulberry, and flows through the area.

== Geography ==
According to the United States Census Bureau, the CDP has a total area of 5.1 square miles (13.2 km^{2}), all land. Mulberry is located where the foothills of the Blue Ridge Mountains level off to the rolling countryside and small valleys of North Carolina's Piedmont region. The area is heavily forested, with numerous small cattle and poultry farms, as well as housing developments.

== Demographics ==
Historical population
Census	Pop.	Note	%±
2020	2,275		—
U.S. Decennial Census

As of the census of 2000, there were 2,269 people, 940 households, and 708 families residing in the CDP. The population density was 444.8 inhabitants per square mile (171.7/km^{2}). There were 999 housing units at an average density of 195.9 per square mile (75.6/km^{2}). The racial makeup of the CDP was 98.24% White, 0.66% African American, 0.18% Native American, 0.13% Asian, 0.04% from other races, and 0.75% from two or more races. Hispanic or Latino of any race were 0.53% of the population.

There were 940 households, out of which 27.9% had children under the age of 18 living with them, 63.3% were married couples living together, 9.1% had a female householder with no husband present, and 24.6% were non-families. 21.4% of all households were made up of individuals, and 7.8% had someone living alone who was 65 years of age or older. The average household size was 2.41 and the average family size was 2.79.

In the CDP, the population was spread out, with 20.8% under the age of 18, 7.5% from 18 to 24, 27.5% from 25 to 44, 29.2% from 45 to 64, and 15.0% who were 65 years of age or older. The median age was 41 years. For every 100 females, there were 92.1 males. For every 100 females age 18 and over, there were 94.6 males.

The median income for a household in the CDP was $40,521, and the median income for a family was $41,607. Males had a median income of $31,685 versus $26,168 for females. The per capita income for the CDP was $18,490. About 4.4% of families and 6.0% of the population were below the poverty line, including 8.2% of those under age 18 and 4.1% of those age 65 or over.

See also: Mulberry Fields on the 1751 map of Virginia and North Carolina by Joshua Fry.
