= Millers Creek, North Carolina =

- CDP
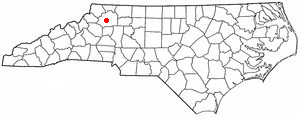
- Location of Miller Creek, North Carolina
- Coordinates: 36°11′27″N 81°14′08″W
- Country: United States
- State: North Carolina
- County: Wilkes

Area
  - Total: 4.47 sq mi (11.59 km^{2})
  - Land: 4.47 sq mi (11.59 km^{2})
  - Water: 0 sq mi (0.00 km^{2})
- Elevation: 1,371 ft (418 m)

Population (2020)
  - Total: 1,931
  - Density: 431/sq mi (166.6/km^{2})
- Time zone: UTC-5 (Eastern (EST))
  - Summer (DST): UTC-4 (EDT)
- ZIP code: 28651
- Area code: 336
- FIPS code: 37-43160
- GNIS feature ID: 2403292

Millers Creek is a census-designated place (CDP) in Wilkes County, North Carolina, United States. As of the 2020 census, Millers Creek had a population of 1,931. West Wilkes High School, one of the four public high schools in Wilkes County, is located in Millers Creek.

== Geography ==
According to the United States Census Bureau, the CDP has a total area of 4.5 square miles (12 km^{2}), all land.

== Demographics ==
Historical population
Census	Pop.	Note	%±
2020	1,931		—
U.S. Decennial Census

=== 2020 census ===
Millers Creek racial composition
Race	Number	Percentage
White (non-Hispanic)	1,708	88.45%
Black or African American (non-Hispanic)	11	0.57%
Asian	15	0.78%
Other/Mixed	56	2.9%
Hispanic or Latino	141	7.3%

As of the 2020 United States census, there were 1,931 people, 747 households, and 393 families residing in the CDP.

=== 2010 census ===
As of the census of 2010, there were 2,112 people, 892 households, and 621 families residing in the CDP. The population density was 469.3 inhabitants per square mile (181.2/km^{2}). There were 1002 housing units at an average density of 222.7 per square mile (86.0/km^{2}). The racial makeup of the CDP was 94.3% White, 0.9% African American, 0.1% Native American, 0.1% Asian, 3.1% from other races, and 1.5% from two or more races. Hispanic or Latino of any race were 4.5% of the population.

There were 892 households, out of which 25.9% had children under the age of 18 living with them, 53.0% were married couples living together, 11.8% had a female householder with no husband present, and 30.4% were non-families. 26.2% of all households were made up of individuals, and 12.0% had someone living alone who was 65 years of age or older. The average household size was 2.37 and the average family size was 2.81.

In the CDP, the population was spread out, with 22.3% under the age of 18, 5.9% from 18 to 24, 23.2% from 25 to 44, 31.2% from 45 to 64, and 17.5% who were 65 years of age or older. The median age was 43.7 years. For every 100 females, there were 97.4 males. For every 100 females age 18 and over, there were 92.5 males.

2014 Census Bureau data shows: the median income for a household in the CDP was $32,092 and the median income for a family was $39,975. Males had a median income of $42,314 versus $28,188 for females. The per capita income for the CDP was $18,771. About 15.0% of families and 22.6% of the population were below the poverty line, including 21.6% of those under age 18 and 11.5% of those age 65 or over.

== Notable people ==
- Bobby Billings (born 1975), musician, singer and songwriter
- Benny Parsons, a well-known NASCAR racer and winner of the 1973 NASCAR championship, was a native of Millers Creek. After retiring from racing, he became a popular racing analyst for the ESPN, NBC, and TBS television networks.
