= Long Branch (Elkin Creek tributary) =

Stream in North Carolina, USA

Long Branch Tributary to Elkin Creek
- Location of Long Branch mouth Long Branch (Elkin Creek tributary) (the United States)

Location
- Country: United States
- State: North Carolina
- County: Wilkes

Physical characteristics
- Source: Little Elkin Creek divide
  - location: Benham, North Carolina
  - coordinates: 36°17′18″N 080°54′58″W
  - elevation: 1,270 ft (390 m)
- Mouth: Elkin Creek
  - location: about 0.5 miles north of Pleasant Hill, North Carolina
  - coordinates: 36°16′11″N 080°52′30″W
  - elevation: 950 ft (290 m)
- Length: 3.37 mi (5.42 km)
- Basin size: 2.18 square miles (5.6 km^{2})
- Discharge
  - location: Elkin Creek
  - average: 3.61 cu ft/s (0.102 m^{3}/s) at mouth with Elkin Creek

Basin features
- Progression: generally southeast
- River system: Yadkin River
- Tributaries
  - left: unnamed tributaries
  - right: unnamed tributaries
- Bridges: Pinecrest Drive, CB Eller School Road, W Walker Road, CB Eller School Road

Long Branch is a 3.37 mi (5.42 km) long 1st order tributary to Elkin Creek in Wilkes County, North Carolina.

== Course ==
Long Branch rises in Benham, North Carolina and then flows southeasterly to join Elkin Creek at about 0.5 miles north of Pleasant Hill, North Carolina.

== Watershed ==
Long Branch drains 2.18 square miles (5.6 km^{2}) of area, receives about 50.0 in/year of precipitation, has a wetness index of 348.51, and is about 42% forested.
