= Kilby Branch (Reddies River tributary) =

Stream in North Carolina, USA

Kilby Branch Tributary to Reddies River
- Location of Kilby Branch mouth Kilby Branch (Reddies River tributary) (the United States)

Location
- Country: United States
- State: North Carolina
- County: Wilkes

Physical characteristics
- Source: Tumbling Shoals Creek divide
  - location: about 5 miles southwest of Halls Mills, North Carolina
  - coordinates: 36°15′46″N 081°13′56″W
  - elevation: 1,920 ft (590 m)
- Mouth: Reddies River
  - location: about 3 miles northeast of Millers Creek, North Carolina
  - coordinates: 36°13′32″N 081°13′08″W
  - elevation: 1,075 ft (328 m)
- Length: 2.43 mi (3.91 km)
- Basin size: 2.34 square miles (6.1 km^{2})
- Discharge
  - location: Reddies River
  - average: 4.28 cu ft/s (0.121 m^{3}/s) at mouth with Reddies River

Basin features
- Progression: generally south
- River system: Yadkin River
- Tributaries
  - left: unnamed tributaries
  - right: unnamed tributaries
- Bridges: Kilby Branch Road (x2), Mountain Valley Church Road, Cora Caudill Road

Kilby Branch is a 2.43 mi (3.91 km) long 1st order tributary to the Reddies River in Wilkes County, North Carolina.

== Course ==
Kilby Branch rises about 5 miles southwest of Halls Mills, North Carolina and then flows south to join the Reddies River at about 3 miles northeast of Millers Creek, North Carolina.

== Watershed ==
Kilby Branch drains 2.34 square miles (6.1 km^{2}) of area, receives about 51.0 in/year of precipitation, has a wetness index of 257.08, and is about 80% forested.
