= Grassy Creek (Elkin Creek tributary) =

Stream in North Carolina, USA

Grassy Creek Tributary to Elkin Creek
- Location of Grassy Creek mouth Grassy Creek (Elkin Creek tributary) (the United States)

Location
- Country: United States
- State: North Carolina
- County: Wilkes; Surry

Physical characteristics
- Source: South Fork divide
  - location: about 0.25 miles northwest of State Road, North Carolina
  - coordinates: 36°19′49″N 080°52′40″W
  - elevation: 1,330 ft (410 m)
- Mouth: Elkin Creek
  - location: about 2 miles northwest of Elkin, North Carolina
  - coordinates: 36°16′35″N 080°52′26″W
  - elevation: 978 ft (298 m)
- Length: 4.62 mi (7.44 km)
- Basin size: 4.13 square miles (10.7 km^{2})
- Discharge
  - location: Elkin Creek
  - average: 6.81 cu ft/s (0.193 m^{3}/s) at mouth with Elkin Creek

Basin features
- Progression: generally south
- River system: Yadkin River
- Tributaries
  - left: unnamed tributaries
  - right: unnamed tributaries
- Bridges: Maple Glen Court, W Forest Drive, Klondike Road Ext., Brookfall Dairy Road, Carter Mill Road

Grassy Creek is a 4.62 mi (7.44 km) long 2nd order tributary to Elkin Creek in Wilkes and Surry counties, North Carolina, United States.

== Course ==
Grassy Creek rises about 0.25 miles northwest of State Road in Wilkes County, North Carolina. Grassy Creek then takes a southerly course bending into Surry County and back into Wilkes County to join Elkin Creek at about 2 miles northwest of Elkin, North Carolina.

== Watershed ==
Grassy Creek drains 4.13 square miles (10.7 km^{2}) of area, receives about 50.1 in/year of precipitation, has a wetness index of 378.99, and is about 48% forested.
