= Stewart Creek (Roaring River tributary) =

Stream in North Carolina, USA

Stewart Creek Tributary to Roaring River
- Location of Stewart Creek mouth Stewart Creek (Roaring River tributary) (the United States)

Location
- Country: United States
- State: North Carolina
- County: Wilkes

Physical characteristics
- Source: Little Bugaboo Creek divide
  - location: about 1.5 miles southwest of Lomax, North Carolina
  - coordinates: 36°16′40″N 081°00′47″W
  - elevation: 1,280 ft (390 m)
- Mouth: Roaring River
  - location: about 6 miles northwest of Roaring River, North Carolina
  - coordinates: 36°15′03″N 081°02′41″W
  - elevation: 986 ft (301 m)
- Length: 2.48 mi (3.99 km)
- Basin size: 2.80 square miles (7.3 km^{2})
- Discharge
  - location: Roaring River
  - average: 4.83 cu ft/s (0.137 m^{3}/s) at mouth with Roaring River

Basin features
- Progression: southwest
- River system: Yadkin River
- Tributaries
  - left: unnamed tributaries
  - right: unnamed tributaries
- Bridges: Greenhorn Road

Stewart Creek is a 2.48 mi (3.99 km) long 1st order tributary to the Roaring River in Wilkes County, North Carolina.

== Course ==
Stewart Creek rises about 1.5 miles southwest of Lomax, North Carolina and then flows southwest to join the Roaring River at about 6 miles northwest of Roaring River, North Carolina.

== Watershed ==
Stewart Creek drains 2.80 square miles (7.3 km^{2}) of area, receives about 50.7 in/year of precipitation, has a wetness index of 323.98, and is about 62% forested.
