= List of peaks named Stone Mountain =

According to the United States Geological Survey Geographical Names Information Service, there are thirty-one peaks in the United States named Stone Mountain:

| Name | USGS link | State | County | USGS map | Coordinates |
|---|---|---|---|---|---|
| Stone Mountain | | Alaska | Yukon-Koyukuk (CA) | Medfra C-2 | 63°43′06″N 153°51′15″W |
| Stone Mountain | | Colorado | Larimer | Drake | 40°23′57″N 105°17′13″W |
| Stone Mountain | | Georgia | DeKalb | Stone Mountain | 33°48′22″N 084°08′45″W |
| Stone Mountain | | Massachusetts | Franklin | Williamsburg | 42°26′00″N 072°39′17″W |
| Stone Mountain | | Massachusetts | Franklin | Heath | 42°41′15″N 072°46′32″W |
| Stone Mountain | | Maine | Oxford | Brownfield | 43°54′37″N 070°54′33″W |
| Stone Mountain | | North Carolina | Caldwell | Buffalo Cove | 36°03′41″N 081°33′21″W |
| Stone Mountain | | North Carolina | Henderson | Standingstone Mountain | 35°13′20″N 082°34′20″W |
| Stone Mountain | | North Carolina | Rutherford | Moffitt Hill | 35°31′04″N 082°14′00″W |
| Stone Mountain | | North Carolina | Transylvania | Rosman | 35°14′51″N 082°48′50″W |
| Stone Mountain | | North Carolina | Watauga | Todd | 36°17′35″N 081°37′13″W |
| Stone Mountain | | North Carolina | Wilkes | Glade Valley | 36°23′37″N 081°02′37″W |
| Stone Mountain | | New Hampshire | Cheshire | West Swanzey | 42°46′18″N 072°20′56″W |
| Stone Mountain | | New Jersey | Burlington | Medford Lakes | 39°49′25″N 074°52′27″W |
| Stone Mountain | | Oregon | Lane | Warner Mountain | 43°37′16″N 122°23′25″W |
| Stone Mountain | | Pennsylvania | Bradford | Powell | 41°40′24″N 076°31′28″W |
| Stone Mountain | | Pennsylvania | Huntingdon | Allensville | 40°32′55″N 077°50′35″W |
| Stone Mountain | | Pennsylvania | Union | Hartleton | 40°55′06″N 077°13′48″W |
| Stone Mountain | | Pennsylvania | Wyoming | Noxen | 41°24′57″N 076°06′45″W |
| Stone Mountain | | Tennessee | Cocke | Hartford | 35°51′54″N 083°08′38″W |
| Stone Mountain | | Tennessee | Greene | Stony Point | 36°22′44″N 082°47′23″W |
| Stone Mountain | | Tennessee | Unicoi | Unicoi | 36°12′36″N 082°16′04″W |
| Stone Mountain | | Virginia | Bedford | Moneta | 37°09′03″N 079°35′23″W |
| Stone Mountain | | Virginia | Carroll | Meadows of Dan | 36°42′16″N 080°28′42″W |
| Stone Mountain | | Virginia | Grayson | Trout Dale | 36°40′16″N 081°28′33″W |
| Stone Mountain | | Virginia | Roanoke (city) | Garden City | 37°14′12″N 079°57′04″W |
| Stone Mountain | | Virginia | Russell | Honaker | 37°04′00″N 081°53′54″W |
| Stone Mountain | | Vermont | Essex | Stone Mountain | 44°33′39″N 071°39′56″W |
| Stone Mountain | | Washington | Stevens | Boundary | 48°54′50″N 117°40′00″W |
| Stone Mountain | | Wyoming | Fremont | Boysen | 43°27′49″N 108°08′43″W |
| Stone Mountain | | Wyoming | Johnson | Stone Mountain | 44°25′46″N 106°55′11″W |
