= Stone Mountain (disambiguation) =

Stone Mountain is a mountain near Atlanta, Georgia, United States.

Stone Mountain is located in Stone Mountain Park in the town of Stone Mountain, Georgia

Stone Mountain may also refer to:

== Places ==
=== Canada ===
- Stone Mountain Provincial Park, British Columbia

=== United States ===
- Stone Mountain (Virginia), near Norton, Virginia
- Stone Mountain (Pennsylvania), along the Kishacoquillas Valley of central Pennsylvania
- Stone Mountain State Park, a North Carolina State Park
- Stone Mountain (North Carolina), a dome of exposed granite central to the North Carolina State Park of the same name
- Stone Mountain Arts Center in Brownfield, Maine

=== Other ===
- In fiction, Stone Mountain is a dwarven nation on Midkemia, a world created by Raymond E. Feist.
- There is a Stone Mountain on the Moon. It was visited during the Apollo 16 mission.

== Television ==
- "Stone Mountain" (30 Rock), a fourth season episode of the American sitcom 30 Rock
