= Scott Dam =

Scott Dam may refer to:

- W. Kerr Scott Dam and Reservoir, in North Carolina
- Scott Dam, impounding Lake Pillsbury in California
