= Fairplains =

Fairplain, Fair Plain or Fairplains may refer to:

- Fairplains, North Carolina
- Fairplain Township, Michigan in Montcalm County
- Fair Plain, Michigan in Berrien County
- Fairplain, West Virginia in Jackson County, West Virginia
