= Lousy Creek (Reddies River tributary) =

Stream in North Carolina, USA

Lousy Creek Tributary to Reddies River
- Location of Lousy Creek mouth Lousy Creek (Reddies River tributary) (the United States)

Location
- Country: United States
- State: North Carolina
- County: Wilkes

Physical characteristics
- Source: Wooten Creek divide
  - location: about 2 miles northwest of Mulberry, North Carolina
  - coordinates: 36°15′43″N 081°11′14″W
  - elevation: 1,760 ft (540 m)
- Mouth: Reddies River
  - location: about 1 mile west of Fairplains, North Carolina
  - coordinates: 36°11′44″N 081°10′31″W
  - elevation: 1,010 ft (310 m)
- Length: 6.12 mi (9.85 km)
- Basin size: 4.90 square miles (12.7 km^{2})
- Discharge
  - location: Reddies River
  - average: 8.70 cu ft/s (0.246 m^{3}/s) at mouth with Reddies River

Basin features
- Progression: southwest
- River system: Yadkin River
- Tributaries
  - left: unnamed tributaries
  - right: unnamed tributaries
- Bridges: Luray Road, Mountain Valley Church Road, Windy Ridge Road, Worthington Road, Baptist Home Road, Ruritan Park Road

Lousy Creek is a 6.12 mi (9.85 km) long 1st order tributary to the Reddies River in Wilkes County, North Carolina.

== Course ==
Lousy Creek rises about 2 miles northwest of Mulberry, North Carolina and then flows south to join the Reddies River at about 1 miles west of Fairplains.

== Watershed ==
Lousy Creek drains 4.90 square miles (12.7 km^{2}) of area, receives about 51.6 in/year of precipitation, has a wetness index of 318.38, and is about 57% forested.
