= Grassy Fork (Elkin Creek tributary) =

Stream in North Carolina, USA

Grassy Fork Tributary to Elkin Creek
- Location of Grassy Fork mouth Grassy Fork (Elkin Creek tributary) (the United States)

Location
- Country: United States
- State: North Carolina
- County: Wilkes

Physical characteristics
- Source: Little Elkin Creek and Elkin Creek divide
  - location: about 0.5 miles northeast of Austin, North Carolina
  - coordinates: 36°19′51″N 080°57′36″W
  - elevation: 1,405 ft (428 m)
- Mouth: Elkin Creek
  - location: about 2.5 miles southwest of State Road, North Carolina
  - coordinates: 36°18′07″N 080°54′11″W
  - elevation: 1,098 ft (335 m)
- Length: 4.31 mi (6.94 km)
- Basin size: 4.31 square miles (11.2 km^{2})
- Discharge
  - location: Elkin Creek
  - average: 7.33 cu ft/s (0.208 m^{3}/s) at mouth with Elkin Creek

Basin features
- Progression: southeast
- River system: Yadkin River
- Tributaries
  - left: unnamed tributaries
  - right: unnamed tributaries
- Bridges: Bear Haven Lane, Mining Ridge Church Road, Layell Road, Byrds Curve Road, Murray Road

Grassy Fork is a 4.77 mi (7.68 km) long 2nd order tributary to Elkin Creek in Wilkes Counties, North Carolina.

== Course ==
Grassy Fork rises about 0.5 miles northeast of Austin in Wilkes County, North Carolina. Grassy Fork then flows southeast to join Elkin Creek at about 2.5 miles southwest of State Road, North Carolina.

== Watershed ==
Grassy Fork drains 4.31 square miles (11.2 km^{2}) of area, receives about 50.5 in/year of precipitation, has a wetness index of 334.33, and is about 50% forested.
