= Hutchinson Homestead (North Carolina) =

Historic farm complex

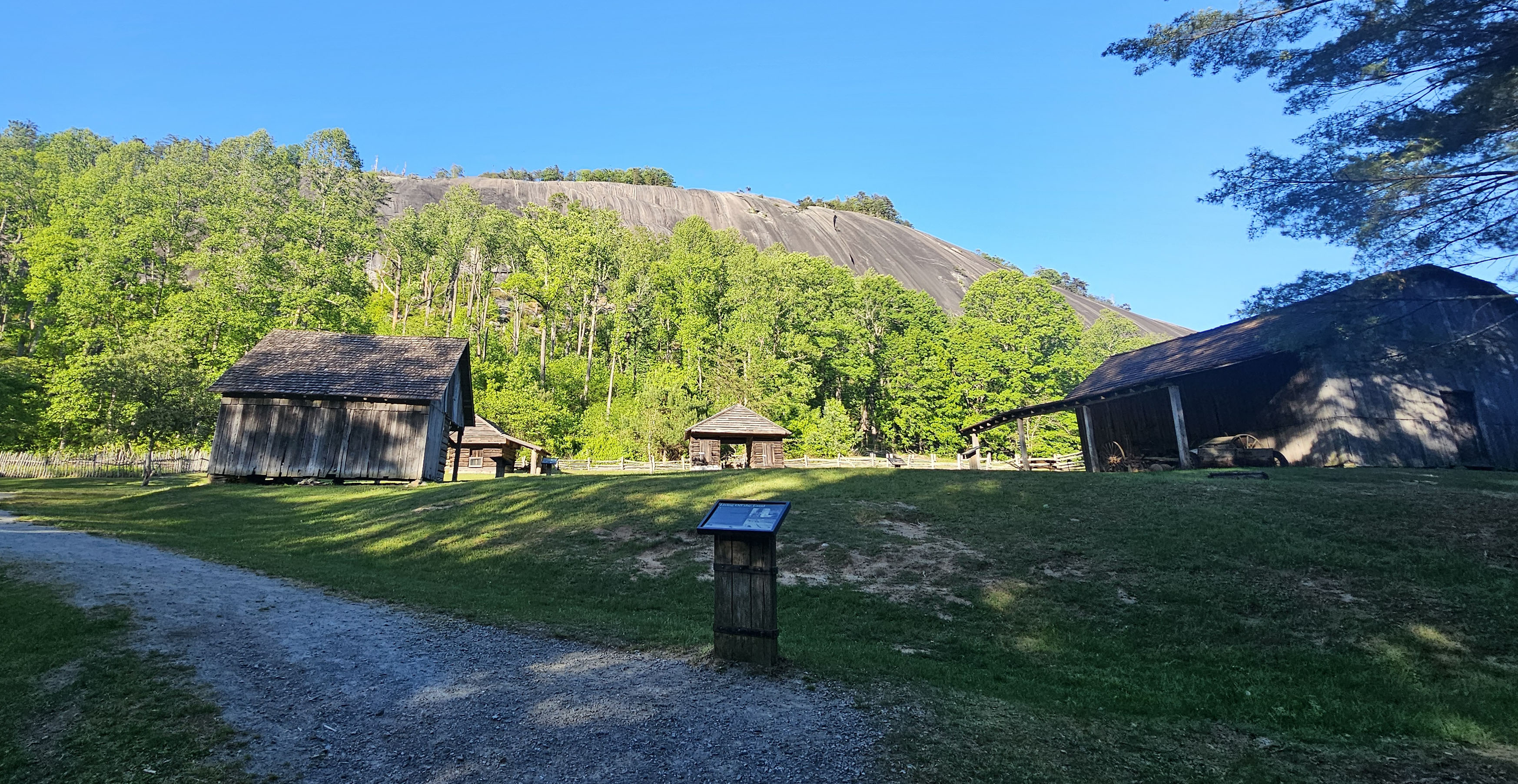
- The Hutchinson Cabin at Stone Mountain State Park.
- Interactive map of Hutchinson Homestead
- 36.3873°N 81.0273°W
- Location: Stone Mountain State Park, Wilkes County, North Carolina, United States

History
- Built: c. 1855

Site notes
- Architectural style: Appalachian log architecture
- Governing body: North Carolina Division of Parks and Recreation

Hutchinson Homestead is a restored nineteenth-century Appalachian farm complex located within Stone Mountain State Park in Wilkes County, North Carolina. The site is centered on the Hutchinson Cabin, a log dwelling constructed about 1855 by John Hutchinson and Cidney Jane Brown Hutchinson, and includes associated farm structures such as a barn, blacksmith shop, corn crib, meat house, tobacco loft, spring box, outhouse, wood shed, gardens, and orchards.

The homestead is interpreted by the North Carolina Division of Parks and Recreation as a restored mid-nineteenth-century mountain farm and as part of the former Stone Mountain community. Before the creation of the state park, the area around Stone Mountain contained numerous self-sufficient farmsteads, churches, schools, mills, and community institutions.

== Location ==
The Hutchinson Homestead is located near Garden Creek at the base of Stone Mountain, a large granite dome within Stone Mountain State Park. The state park lies in Wilkes and Alleghany counties in northwestern North Carolina, approximately 60 miles northwest of Winston-Salem.

The homestead is shown on official park maps as a point of interest near the Stone Mountain Loop Trail and Garden Creek Baptist Church. The surrounding historic area was part of the Garden Creek community, one of several rural settlements that developed around Stone Mountain before the creation of the park.

== Historical background ==
Long before Stone Mountain became a state park, the surrounding region was settled by families of English, German, Irish, French, and Scots-Irish descent. These settlers established log homes, farms, mills, churches, and schools that supported largely self-sufficient mountain communities.

Interpretive materials at the homestead state that the Hutchinson and Brown families migrated into the region from Virginia and Maryland during the eighteenth century. By the early nineteenth century, members of these families had established farms in present-day Wilkes and Surry counties around Stone Mountain.

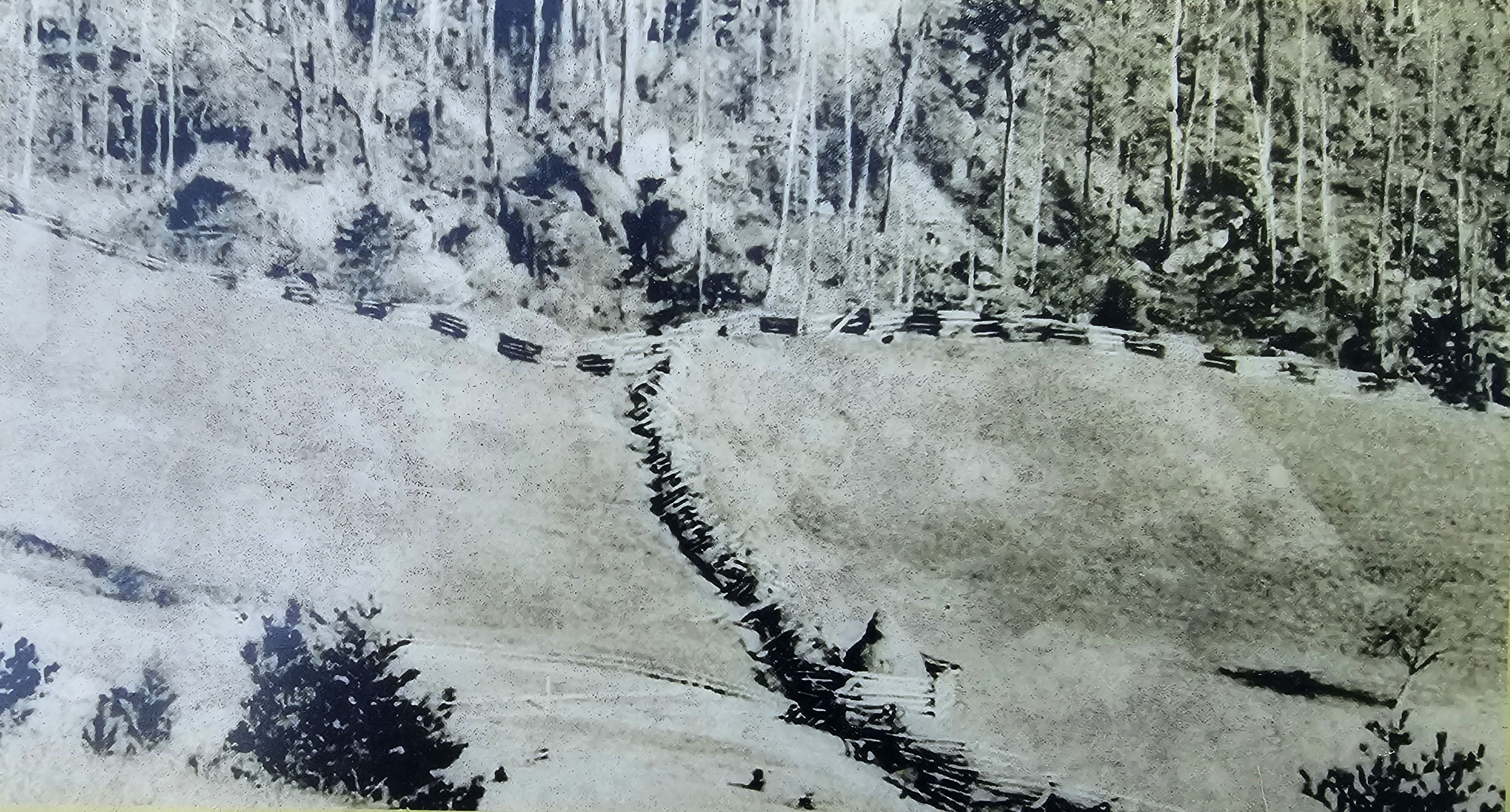
The Hutchinson homestead pastures in 1890.

During the nineteenth century, the broader Stone Mountain community included more than sixty family homesteads, along with schools, churches, a post office, and agricultural lands. Families in the area grew crops, raised livestock, hunted, foraged, and relied on local craft skills to support daily life.

== Hutchinson family ==
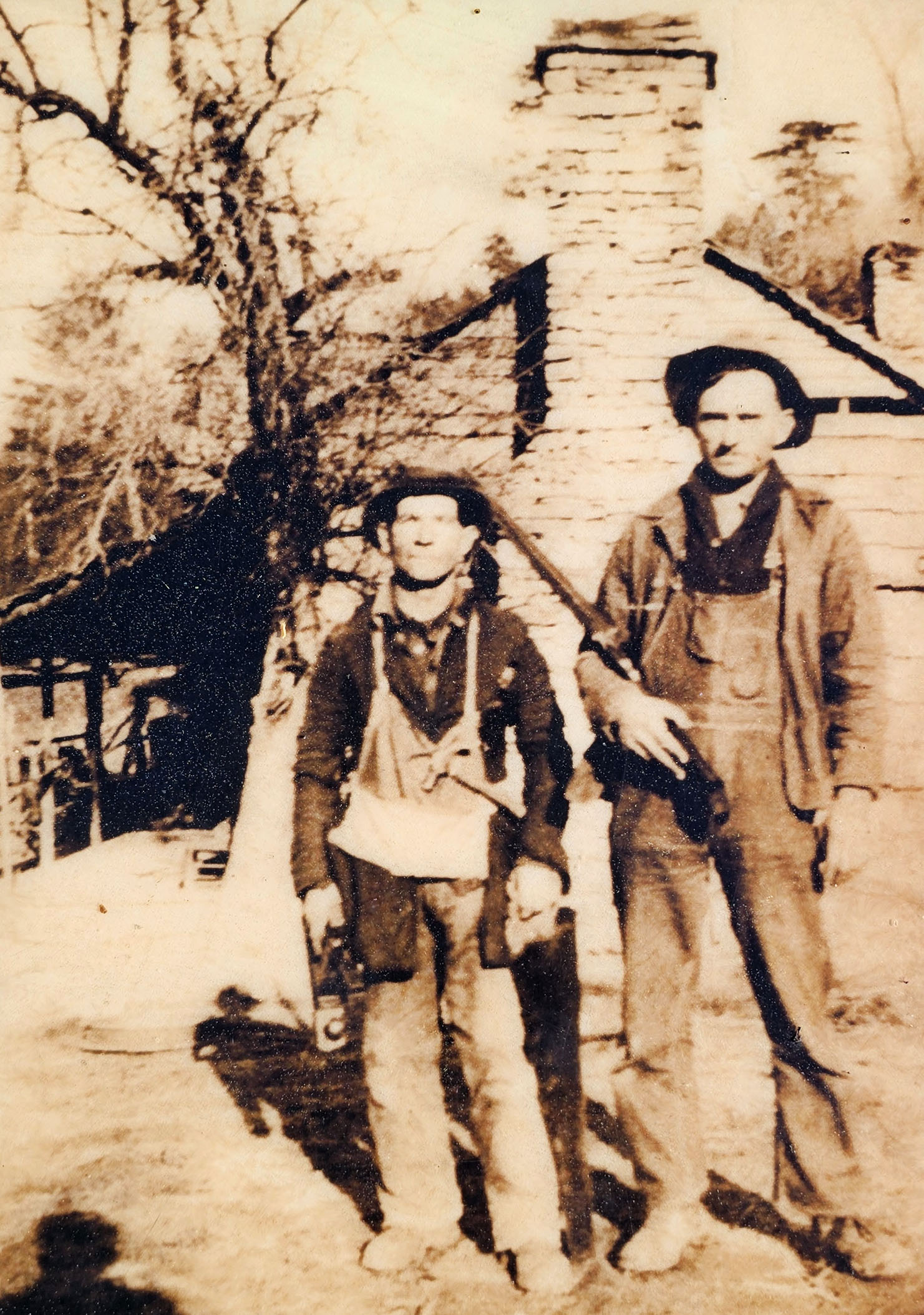
John Eli Hutchinson standing in front of the family cabin.

John Hutchinson and Cidney Jane Brown Hutchinson began construction of the homestead around 1855. They raised eight children on the farm. The original cabin consisted of a kitchen, bedroom, and loft, and the farmstead gradually expanded to include additional domestic, agricultural, and craft structures.

Their son, John Eli Hutchinson, later enlarged the cabin by adding a southern pen, converting the original kitchen into living space, and adding an enclosed passageway and front porch. John Eli Hutchinson also worked as a farmer, blacksmith, and farrier, serving both the homestead and the surrounding rural community.

The property remained in the Hutchinson family for approximately 120 years. In 1969, the State of North Carolina acquired land around Stone Mountain as part of the establishment of Stone Mountain State Park. Members of the Hutchinson family continued to live on the property after acquisition. Jim Hutchinson became the first ranger at Stone Mountain State Park, and he and Ruth Hutchinson remained at the homestead until 1979.

== Stone Mountain State Park ==
Stone Mountain State Park was established in 1969 after local efforts led to the acquisition of 1,463 acres of land. Part of the land was donated, and its value was used as matching funds for grants from the Land and Water Conservation Fund and the Appalachian Regional Commission. The park has since grown into one of the larger units of the North Carolina state parks system.

The park is known for its 600-foot granite dome, which was designated a National Natural Landmark in 1974. In addition to its natural features, the park preserves cultural resources including the Hutchinson Homestead and Garden Creek Baptist Church.

== Architecture ==
The Hutchinson Cabin reflects several building traditions associated with settlers in the southern Appalachian Mountains. Interpretive materials at the site describe the rectangular form and stone underpinning of the original northern section as reflecting German building traditions, while the one-and-a-half-story form and later additions show English influence.

The original section of the cabin rests on a stone foundation, while later additions use stone piers. These piers improved airflow beneath the structure during warm weather. The cabin also features an end chimney, rather than the central chimney often associated with some German-derived log-building traditions.

=== Construction methods ===
The cabin was built using locally available timber and stone. Trees were felled, cut to length, and shaped with hand tools such as broad axes and adzes. The log walls were raised using traditional corner notching, and spaces between the logs were filled with clay and wooden chinking to reduce drafts and weather exposure.

The roof was originally covered with hand-split wooden shingles, or shakes. The site was chosen for practical reasons including access to water, sunlight, and protection from prevailing winds by the surrounding landscape and the mass of Stone Mountain.

== Farm economy and daily life ==
The Hutchinson farm was a diversified Appalachian mountain farm. The family grew corn, tobacco, vegetables, fruits, and nuts, and raised livestock including hogs, cattle, goats, chickens, horses, oxen, and mules.

The family supplemented farm production by hunting, fishing, and gathering wild foods and medicinal plants from nearby forests. Interpretive materials identify ginseng, butterfly weed, and wild ginger among plants used in traditional remedies.

Food preservation was essential to the homestead. Vegetables and fruits were dried, pickled, or stored in cool places. Pork was preserved through salting, smoking, and curing. A spring box supplied naturally cooled storage for milk, butter, and other perishables before mechanical refrigeration was available.

== Contributing structures ==
=== Hutchinson Cabin ===
The Hutchinson Cabin is the central domestic structure of the homestead. The original cabin, built about 1855, contained a kitchen, bedroom, and loft. John Eli Hutchinson later enlarged the building with a second pen, a connecting passageway, and a front porch.

The cabin served as both a household and work space. Like many mountain dwellings, it was built from materials harvested or quarried near the site and adapted over time as the family grew and household needs changed.

=== Barn ===
The barn was constructed by John Eli Hutchinson in the early twentieth century. According to interpretive materials, the original farm barn was probably a smaller log structure, while the present frame barn was built with flat-board siding. A shed addition was added in the 1950s.

The barn served as the center of livestock operations. Farm tools, harnesses, and equipment were stored in the building, while hay and fodder were stored in the loft. Livestock associated with the farm included chickens, goats, hogs, milk cows, horses, oxen, and mules.

=== Corn crib ===
The homestead includes a double corn crib used for storing and drying corn. Its elevated construction, open wall gaps, and ventilated design helped protect harvested corn from moisture, spoilage, and rodents.

Corn was among the most important crops grown on Appalachian farms. It served as food for the family, feed for livestock, and a crop that could be dried and stored for later use. Interpretive materials note that corn shucking was often a communal event, combining agricultural labor with social gathering and shared meals.

=== Blacksmith shop ===
John Eli Hutchinson worked as a blacksmith and farrier. His original blacksmith shop, a board-and-batten structure dating to the 1890s, no longer survives. The blacksmith shop now standing at the homestead was relocated from Lake Norman State Park and dates to the mid-nineteenth century.

The shop interprets the role of blacksmiths in rural Appalachian communities. Blacksmiths made and repaired tools, hardware, wagon fittings, and other ironwork. As a farrier, Hutchinson also shoed horses and mules. Interpretive materials note that he often bartered his services rather than receiving cash payment.

=== Meat house and tobacco loft ===
The meat house and tobacco loft interpreted at the homestead represent two important aspects of farm production: food preservation and tobacco curing. Hogs were a major source of meat, and pork was preserved by salting, smoking, and curing.

John Eli Hutchinson also cultivated small quantities of tobacco for personal use. Tobacco leaves were cured in the loft and later processed for chewing or smoking.

=== Spring box and wash place ===
The spring box was built over a mountain spring and functioned as a natural refrigerator. The constant flow of cool spring water helped preserve milk, butter, and other perishables.

The same spring area also served as a wash place. Laundry was done by hand using homemade lye soap derived from wood ash. Clothing was scrubbed, boiled, rinsed, and dried outdoors.

=== Outhouse and wood shed ===
The homestead included an outhouse and wood shed. The outhouse served household sanitation needs before indoor plumbing, while the wood shed stored fuel for cooking and heating.

=== Gardens and orchards ===
Gardens and orchards were central to the farm's self-sufficiency. The family grew vegetables, fruit, and nuts, and also relied on wild plants from surrounding forests. Produce was eaten fresh during the growing season and preserved for winter use.

The homestead's gardens interpret the mixture of cultivated and foraged foods that supported mountain households. Medicinal plants and herbs also formed part of the household economy, particularly in remote communities with limited access to professional medical care.

== Historic documentation ==
The Hutchinson Homestead was documented by photographer and folklorist Blanton Owen in 1978 as part of cultural documentation in northwestern Wilkes County. The Library of Congress holds photographs titled Hutchinson Homestead, Stone Mountain State Park, northwest Wilkes County, North Carolina and Hutchinson house, Stone Mountain State Park, northwest Wilkes County, North Carolina.

The homestead is also discussed in state park planning and interpretive publications, including the 1971 Master Plan: Stone Mountain State Park, the 1994 General Management Plan for Stone Mountain State Park, and the 2002 North Carolina Division of Parks and Recreation publication Our Changing Land: Stone Mountain State Park.

== Interpretation and public access ==
The Hutchinson Homestead is interpreted as one of the primary cultural-history sites within Stone Mountain State Park. Official park materials identify it as a restored mid-nineteenth-century farm at the base of Stone Mountain.

The grounds are accessible from the park trail system, and the homestead is marked on official park maps as a point of interest. Park events occasionally include staff-led programs at the homestead, allowing visitors to view the cabin and learn about the history of the park and surrounding mountain community.

== Legacy ==
The Hutchinson Homestead preserves the material culture of a self-sufficient Appalachian mountain farm and helps interpret the rural communities that existed around Stone Mountain before the creation of the state park. Together with Garden Creek Baptist Church and other cultural resources in the park, it provides insight into the agricultural, architectural, religious, and community life of the Stone Mountain region during the nineteenth and early twentieth centuries.

== See also ==
- Stone Mountain State Park
- Garden Creek Baptist Church
- Appalachian architecture
- Log cabin
- North Carolina State Parks
