= Roaring River (North Carolina) =

Stream in North Carolina, USA

Roaring River Tributary to Yadkin River
- Location of Roaring River mouth Roaring River (North Carolina) (the United States)

Location
- Country: United States
- State: North Carolina
- County: Wilkes
- City: Roaring River

Physical characteristics
- Source: confluence of Middle Prong and East Prong of Roaring River
  - location: about 5 miles southwest of Lomax, North Carolina
  - coordinates: 36°16′12″N 081°03′40″W
  - elevation: 1,098 ft (335 m)
- Mouth: Yadkin River
  - location: Roaring River, North Carolina
  - coordinates: 36°12′06″N 081°00′31″W
  - elevation: 915 ft (279 m)
- Length: 2.86 mi (4.60 km)
- Basin size: 139.59 square miles (361.5 km^{2})
- Discharge
  - location: Yadkin River
  - average: 214.93 cu ft/s (6.086 m^{3}/s) at mouth with Yadkin River

Basin features
- Progression: southeast
- River system: Yadkin River
- Tributaries
  - left: Stewart Creek
  - right: unnamed tributaries
- Bridges: Bethany Ford Road, Arbor Grove Baptist Road, NC 268

The Roaring River is a tributary of the Yadkin River in northwestern North Carolina in the United States. Via the Yadkin it is part of the watershed of the Pee Dee River, which flows to the Atlantic Ocean. According to the Geographic Names Information System, it has also been known historically as "Roaring Creek." The river's name comes from its headwaters in the Blue Ridge Mountains, where it flows through a series of small waterfalls.

The Roaring River and its headwater tributaries (its East, Middle and West Prongs) all flow for their entire lengths in Wilkes County, rising in the Blue Ridge Mountains near and around Stone Mountain State Park. Below the confluence of its principal tributaries, the Roaring River flows southeastwardly to its confluence with the Yadkin River, about 4 mi (6 km) south-southwest of Ronda. The river gives its name to the community of Roaring River, a village located at the mouth of the river.

== Variant names ==
According to the Geographic Names Information System, it has also been known historically as:

- Roaring Creek

== See also ==
- List of North Carolina rivers
