= Hoopers Branch =

Stream in North Carolina, USA

Hoopers Branch Tributary to Reddies River
- Location of Hoopers Branch mouth Hoopers Branch (the United States)

Location
- Country: United States
- State: North Carolina
- County: Wilkes
- City: North Wilkesboro

Physical characteristics
- Source: divide of unnamed tributary to Mulberry Creek
  - location: North Wilkesboro, North Carolina
  - coordinates: 36°10′41″N 081°08′55″W
  - elevation: 1,120 ft (340 m)
- Mouth: Reddies River
  - location: about 0.5 miles west of North Wilkesboro, North Carolina
  - coordinates: 36°10′11″N 081°10′09″W
  - elevation: 975 ft (297 m)
- Length: 0.95 mi (1.53 km)
- Basin size: 0.71 square miles (1.8 km^{2})
- Discharge
  - location: Reddies River
  - average: 1.33 cu ft/s (0.038 m^{3}/s) at mouth with Reddies River

Basin features
- Progression: southwest
- River system: Yadkin River
- Tributaries
  - left: unnamed tributaries
  - right: unnamed tributaries
- Bridges: Riverside Drive, Hackett Street, NW Reservoir Road

Hoopers Branch is a 0.95 mi (1.53 km) long first order tributary to the Reddies River in Wilkes County, North Carolina. This is the only stream of this name in the United States.

== Course ==
Hoopers Branch rises in North Wilkesboro, North Carolina and then flows southwest to join the Reddies River at about 0.5 miles west of North Wilkesboro.

== Watershed ==
Hooper Branch drains 0.71 square miles (1.8 km^{2}) of area, receives about 51.5 in/year of precipitation, has a wetness index of 307.83, and is about 41% forested.
