= Gilreath =

Gilreath is the surname of the following people:

- David Gilreath (born 1988), American football wide receiver
- Erin Gilreath (born 1980), American hammer thrower
- George Allen Gilreath (1834–1863), American military commander
- James Gilreath (1936–2003), American pop singer and songwriter
