= Tumbling Shoals Creek =

Stream in North Carolina, USA

Tumbling Shoals Creek Tributary to Reddies River
- Location of Tumbling Shoals Creek mouth Tumbling Shoals Creek (the United States)

Location
- Country: United States
- State: North Carolina
- County: Wilkes

Physical characteristics
- Source: Wooten Creek divide
  - location: about 3 miles southwest of Halls Mills, North Carolina
  - coordinates: 36°16′38″N 081°14′09″W
  - elevation: 1,965 ft (599 m)
- Mouth: Reddies River
  - location: about 2 miles southeast of Wilbar, North Carolina
  - coordinates: 36°13′45″N 081°14′49″W
  - elevation: 1,535 ft (468 m)
- Length: 3.52 mi (5.66 km)
- Basin size: 3.30 square miles (8.5 km^{2})
- Discharge
  - location: Reddies River
  - average: 5.91 cu ft/s (0.167 m^{3}/s) at mouth with Reddies River

Basin features
- Progression: south-southwest
- River system: Yadkin River
- Tributaries
  - left: unnamed tributaries
  - right: unnamed tributaries
- Bridges: Tumbling Shoals Road

Tumbling Shoals Creek is a 3.52 mi (5.66 km) long 1st order tributary to the Reddies River in Wilkes County, North Carolina. This is the only stream of this name in the United States.

== Course ==
Tumbling Shoals Creek rises about 3 miles southwest of Halls Mills, North Carolina and then flows south-southwest to join the Reddies River at about 3 miles southeast of Wilbar, North Carolina.

== Watershed ==
Tumbling Shoals Creek drains 3.30 square miles (8.5 km^{2}) of area, receives about 50.5 in/year of precipitation, has a wetness index of 253.51, and is about 88% forested.
