= Little Elkin Creek =

Stream in North Carolina, USA

Little Elkin Creek Tributary to Yadkin River
- Location of Little Elkin Creek mouth Little Elkin Creek (the United States)

Location
- Country: United States
- State: North Carolina
- County: Wilkes

Physical characteristics
- Source: Elkin Creek divide
  - location: about 0.25 miles northeast of Austin, North Carolina
  - coordinates: 36°19′36″N 080°58′13″W
  - elevation: 1,418 ft (432 m)
- Mouth: Yadkin River
  - location: about 1 mile west of Elkin, North Carolina
  - coordinates: 36°14′07″N 080°53′32″W
  - elevation: 878 ft (268 m)
- Length: 9.27 mi (14.92 km)
- Basin size: 12.83 square miles (33.2 km^{2})
- Discharge
  - location: Yadkin River
  - average: 20.14 cu ft/s (0.570 m^{3}/s) at mouth with Yadkin River

Basin features
- Progression: southeast
- River system: Yadkin River
- Tributaries
  - left: unnamed tributaries
  - right: unnamed tributaries
- Bridges: Austin Traphill Road, Barker Road, Gentry Road, Grange Road, Greenhorn Road, Luffman Road, Little Elkin Church Road, Elkin Highway

Little Elkin Creek is a 9.27 mi (14.92 km) long 3rd order tributary to the Yadkin River in Wilkes County, North Carolina.

== Variant names ==
According to the Geographic Names Information System, it has also been known historically as:

- Little Elkin River

== Course ==
Little Elkin Creek rises about 0.25 miles northeast of Austin, North Carolina and then flows southeasterly to join the Yadkin River at about 1 mile west of Elkin, North Carolina.

== Watershed ==
Little Elkin Creek drains 12.83 square miles (33.2 km^{2}) of area, receives about 50.1 in/year of precipitation, has a wetness index of 355.54, and is about 47% forested.
