= Reddies River =

Stream in North Carolina, USA

Reddies River Tributary to Yadkin River
- Location of Reddies River mouth Reddies River (the United States)

Location
- Country: United States
- State: North Carolina
- County: Wilkes
- City: North Wilkesboro

Physical characteristics
- Source: confluence of South and North Prongs of Reddies River
  - location: about 1 mile east of Wilbar, North Carolina
  - coordinates: 36°14′25″N 081°17′18″W
  - elevation: 1,160 ft (350 m)
- Mouth: Yadkin River
  - location: North Wilkesboro, North Carolina
  - coordinates: 36°09′08″N 081°08′49″W
  - elevation: 945 ft (288 m)
- Length: 15.60 mi (25.11 km)
- Basin size: 93.09 square miles (241.1 km^{2})
- Discharge
  - location: Yadkin River
  - average: 156.85 cu ft/s (4.441 m^{3}/s) at mouth with Yadkin River

Basin features
- Progression: southeast
- River system: Yadkin River
- Tributaries
  - left: North Fork Reddies River; Tumbling Shoals Creek; Kilby Branch; Lousy Creek; Hoopers Branch
  - right: South Fork Reddies River; Quarry Branch
- Bridges: Old NC 16, Mountain Valley Church Road, Suncrest Sunny Conn Road, NC 18

The Reddies River is a tributary of the Yadkin River in northwestern North Carolina in the United States. Via the Yadkin it is part of the watershed of the Pee Dee River, which flows to the Atlantic Ocean. According to the Geographic Names Information System, it has also been known historically as "Reddis River."

The Reddies River and its headwater tributaries (its North, Middle and South Forks) all flow for their entire lengths in Wilkes County. Below the confluence of its principal tributaries, the Reddies River flows generally southeastwardly to its confluence with the Yadkin River at North Wilkesboro. The Reddies River is known for its excellent trout fishing. In North Wilkesboro the Reddies River is dammed, and the small lake created by the dam supplies most of the town's water needs. A trail built for bikers, joggers, and walkers by the town of North Wilkesboro crosses over the Reddies River at its mouth where it joins the Yadkin River. A bridge, 156 feet in length, allows bikers, joggers and walkers to cross.

At the beginning of the twentieth century, the headwaters of the Reddies River was a prime area for the timber industry. Due to the difficulty of getting the timber out of the narrow valleys of the Blue Ridge Mountains, a large flume was built to carry the timber to the town of North Wilkesboro. At one time the flume, which followed the course of the Reddies River, was over 19 miles long and crossed the river no less than a dozen times. The flume suffered heavy damage in the great flood of 1916; it was dismantled shortly after the flood.

== See also ==
- List of North Carolina rivers
