= Call, North Carolina =

Unincorporated community in North Carolina, US

Coordinates: 36°08′45″N 81°04′39″W

Call is an unincorporated community in Wilkes County, North Carolina, United States.
