= Darby, North Carolina =

Unincorporated community in North Carolina, US

Coordinates: 36°07′16″N 81°29′43″W

Darby is an unincorporated community in Wilkes County, North Carolina, United States.

== History ==
Darby was named for Darby Hendrix, a pioneer settler.
