= Clingman, North Carolina =

Unincorporated community in North Carolina, US

Coordinates: 36°10′42″N 80°55′40″W

Clingman is an unincorporated community in Wilkes County, North Carolina, United States.
