= WWWC (AM) =

Radio station in Wilkesboro, North Carolina

Coordinates: 36°09′00″N 81°09′42″W

- Wilkesboro, North Carolina; United States
- Broadcast area: Wilkes County, North Carolina
- Frequency: 1240 kHz
- Branding: 1240 3WC

Programming
- Format: Southern gospel

Ownership
- Owner: Foothills Media, Inc. (John Wishon)

History
- First air date: January 26, 1970
- Call sign meaning: "Wonderful World of Wilkes County"

Technical information
- Licensing authority: FCC
- Facility ID: 22017
- Class: C
- Power: 1,000 watts unlimited
- Repeaters: 100.1 W261CG; 103.5 W278CZ (Elkin)

Links
- Public license information: Public file; LMS
- Website: www.12403wc.com

WWWC (1240 AM), also known as 3WC, is a 24-hour Southern gospel radio station located in Wilkesboro, North Carolina, United States, serving Wilkes County. The station which is owned by Foothills Media, Inc., broadcasts with a power of 1 kilowatt at 1240 kHz on the AM band, as well as over the internet.

== History ==
On November 20, 1968, Paul Cashion and J.B. Wilson, doing business as Wilkes County Radio, obtained a construction permit for a new 100-watt radio station in Wilkesboro. WWWC signed on January 26, 1970, with a country music format. Later that year, the station increased its power to 500 watts during the day and 250 watts at night. Shortly after, the station shifted towards a Top 40 format, which remained for most of the next 30 years.

In 1983, Tomlinson Broadcasting acquired WWWC for $410,000. However, the company filed for bankruptcy reorganization in 1991, owing most of its debt to the original owners, Cashion and Wilson. The station went off the air on November 12, 1992, and returned on December 4 with Cashion and Wilson once again at the helm. This revival was short-lived, as Cashion suffered a stroke and decided to withdraw, leading to the station's closure again on January 7, 1993.

WWWC remained off the air until the station was purchased by Ken Byrd, Alan Combs, and John Wishon and adopted its Southern gospel format on July 11, 1994. 3WC is currently owned by John Wishon, who bought out the station from co-owner Alan Combs in 2006 for $200,000.

== Translators ==
In addition to the main station, WWWC is relayed by translators to widen its broadcast area. Cumberland Communities Communications Corporation, owner of WDVX, sold the Wilkesboro frequency to Foothills Media Inc. for $20,000. In July 2019, a second transmitter was put in place near Elkin, adding an FM signal to the northeast of Wilkesboro.

Call sign	Frequency	City of license	FID	ERP (W)	Class	FCC info
W261CG	100.1 FM	Wilkesboro, North Carolina	142229	250	D	LMS
W278CZ	103.5 FM	Elkin, North Carolina	202509	250	D	LMS
