= Elkin Creek =

Stream in North Carolina, USA

Elkin Creek Tributary to Yadkin River
- Location of Elkin Creek mouth Elkin Creek (the United States)

Location
- Country: United States
- State: North Carolina
- County: Surry
- City: Elkin

Physical characteristics
- Source: Laurel Branch divide
  - location: about 1 mile east-southeast of Roaring Gap, North Carolina
  - coordinates: 36°23′54″N 080°58′01″W
  - elevation: 2,670 ft (810 m)
- Mouth: Yadkin River
  - location: Elkin, North Carolina
  - coordinates: 36°14′27″N 080°51′08″W
  - elevation: 878 ft (268 m)
- Length: 8.96 mi (14.42 km)
- Basin size: 36.32 square miles (94.1 km^{2})
- Discharge
  - location: Yadkin River
  - average: 55.33 cu ft/s (1.567 m^{3}/s) at mouth with Yadkin River

Basin features
- Progression: southeast
- River system: Yadkin River
- Tributaries
  - left: Grassy Creek
  - right: Grassy Fork; Long Branch
- Bridges: US 21, N Old Highway 21, Traphill Road, Union Community Road, Wiley Royal Road, Roaring Gap Church Road, Whisper Ridge Lane, Mining Ridge Church Road, Murray Road, Preacher Field Road, Carter Mill Road, CC Camp Road, Elk Spur Street, W Main Street

Elkin Creek is a 3.91 mi (6.29 km) long 4th order tributary to the Yadkin River in Surry and Wilkes Counties, North Carolina. This is the only stream of this name in the United States.

== Variant names ==
According to the Geographic Names Information System, it has also been known historically as:

- Big Elkin Creek
- Elkin River

== Course ==
Elkin Creek rises about 1 mile east-southeast of Roaring Gap in Wilkes County, North Carolina. Elkin Creek then flows southeast into Surry County to join the Yadkin River at Elkin.

== Watershed ==
Elkin Creek drains 36.32 square miles (94.1 km^{2}) of area, receives about 49.9 in/year of precipitation, has a wetness index of 348.98, and is about 49% forested.
