= George Allen Gilreath =

George A. Gilreath
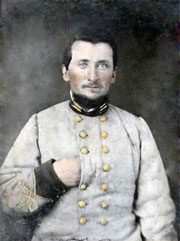
- Captain George A. Gilreath
- Born: September 26, 1834; Wilkes County, North Carolina
- Died: July 3, 1863 (aged 28); Gettysburg, Pennsylvania
- Burial place: Memorial Old Gilreath Family Cem. Wilkes Co., North Carolina
- Military career
- Allegiance: United States of America; Confederate States of America
- Branch: Confederate States Army
- Service years: 1862–1863 (CSA)
- Rank: Captain
- Commands: (North Carolina) Company B 55th NC Troops, Acting Commander 55th NC Regiment, CSA American Civil War: Battle of Washington, NC; Battle of Suffolk, VA; Battle of Gettysburg; Pickett's Charge
- Awards: Roll of Honor

George Allen Gilreath (September 26, 1834 – July 3, 1863) was a Confederate soldier who commanded the North Carolina 55th Regiment during Pickett's Charge at the Battle of Gettysburg. He was killed during the charge, which became known as the high-water mark of the Confederacy.

== Early years ==
Gilreath was born in Wilkes County, North Carolina, on September 26, 1834, to Noah Gilreath Sr. and Elizabeth Allen of Wilkes County. He grew up on a 600-acre (2.4 km^{2}) family plantation where his grandfather Alexander Gilreath had settled in 1776. His grandfather, a Revolutionary War Veteran of the Wilkes County Regiment, operated a grist mill and blacksmith shop and served as tax collector, constable, justice of the peace, postmaster, and school board member. The plantation retained about a dozen slaves worked the land.

In his early 20s, Gilreath left North Carolina and bought land in Hempsted County, Arkansas. On July 30, 1857, he married Lurana Gilbert but when his wife and young child died, he came back to Wilkes County.

== Civil War ==
On March 1, 1862, at age 27, Gilreath volunteered at Wilkesboro, North Carolina, into Company B, 55th N.C. Troops, as a 2nd Lieutenant. The 55th was part of Davis's Brigade, Pettigrew's Division. He was promoted to 1st Lieutenant on May 19. On September 15, 1862, he was promoted to Captain after Captain Forester resigned as commander of the Wilkes County Company.

The following year, at the climax of the Battle of Gettysburg, General Robert E. Lee ordered Major General George Pickett to punch a hole in the center of the Federal Army, then attack the right and left flanks. Fifteen regiments of Tar Heels, including the 55th N.C., were part of the 12,500-man force selected to participate in the attack. Many of the field and staff officers of the 55th N.C. were killed or wounded in the first two days of fighting. On the third day of fighting, the 55th was put under the command of senior Captain Gilreath. On July 3 at 1:00 pm the artillery barrage from 140 Confederate cannons started, and at 3:00 pm, the Confederates formed a battle line to march across a mile of open field to a stone wall on Cemetery Ridge that was protecting Union troops. Although most of the Confederates failed to make it to the stone wall several members of the 55th made it to the wall and beyond.

Gilreath was killed in the charge. The Army of Northern Virginia retreated in the rain on July 4, leaving Gettysburg for Virginia. It is believed that Gilreath was left on the battlefield.
