= Sallie Chapman Gordon Law =

Confederate nurse

Sallie Chapman Gordon Law (nicknamed Mother of the Confederacy; 1805–1894) was the first recorded Confederate nurse in the American Civil War.

== Biography ==
Law was the president of the (Society of) Southern Mothers' Association, a group of women from the Second Presbyterian Church in Memphis, Tennessee.

The Southern Mothers started making uniforms for Tennessee soldiers before the state had even seceded from the Union. This was initially done in Mrs. Miles Owen's house at Madison and Third Street in Memphis. As the number of Women working increased, they moved to the basement of the Second Presbyterian Church. This may have been because their Pastor Dr. Grundy would not pray for or support the men of the Hickory Rifles and the Church was soon closed by the "Presbytery".

To meet the needs of the "sick confederate boys" in April 1861, the Memphis ladies first organized in Mrs Leroy Pope's house and set up twelve beds in Mrs. W. B. Greenlaw's house. Soon they moved again to Court Square on Irving, "at one time we had three hundred measles patients." (Page 5 of Her book) "Our Southern Mothers' Hospital in the Irving block was then moved to the Overton Hospital..."

The Southern Mothers' worked at Overton Hospital, tending to Confederate and Union patients. She also went to La Grange, Georgia, where she worked at Law Hospital, which was named after her.

The contributions of clothes and supplies became more than their Hospital could use, Sallie Law starting taking supplies to other locations. After the Federals took Memphis, Sallie Law left Memphis to move supplies where ever she found need.

On a trip to Columbus, Georgia, Sallie Law heard of the terrible conditions for soldiers in Gen. J. E. Johnson's division in Dalton, GA. Sallie Law went to the Ladies' Aid Society of Columbus to get Johnson's division the needed aid. After a second needed shipment for General Johnson's troops, the general arranged dinner celebrations and "a parade of thirty thousand brave, tattered troops" in honor her mission to Dalton, Georgia.

After the war she strove to comfort the vanquished and encourage the down-hearted, and continued in her way to do much good work.

== Personal life ==
She was born Sarah Chapman Gordon on August 27, 1805, in Wilkes, North Carolina, to Chapman Gordon who fought at the Battle of Kings Mountain and Charity King. She married Rev. John Sandiford Law Jan. 25, 1825 in Putnam, Georgia. They had seven girls and one boy John Gordon Law, Confederate soldier. Sallie Law died June 28, 1894, in Memphis, Tennessee.

== See also ==
- General Joseph E. Johnston
- First Battle of Dalton
- Army of Tennessee
