= Roaring River, North Carolina =

- Unincorporated community
- Location within North Carolina Location within the United States
- Coordinates: 36°12′23″N 81°00′13″W
- Country: United States
- State: North Carolina
- County: Wilkes
- Elevation: 974 ft (297 m)
- Time zone: UTC-5 (Eastern (EST))
  - Summer (DST): UTC-4 (EDT)
- ZIP code: 28669
- Area code: 336
- GNIS feature ID: 993434

Roaring River is an unincorporated community in Wilkes County, North Carolina, United States. Roaring River is located along North Carolina Highway 268 near the mouth of the Roaring River, 3.6 miles (5.8 km) west-southwest of Ronda. Roaring River has a post office with ZIP code 28669.

Roaring River, a tributary of the Yadkin River, joins here.

Roaring River is a small agriculture-based village in Western North Carolina. There is one gas station, a hardware store, and a Tyson Company Plant. Local (public) schools near Roaring River are Roaring River Elementary School, whose Principal is Danielle Dowell, East Wilkes Middle School, whose principal is Jason Llewelyn, and East Wilkes High School, whose Principal is Dustin Webb.

Notable roads, freeways, and/or thoroughfares near Roaring River are Hoots Rd, White Plains Rd, NC Highway 268, and Highway 421.
