= Pleasant Hill, Wilkes County, North Carolina =

Pleasant Hill, North Carolina
- CDP
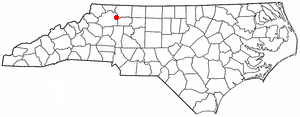
- Location of Pleasant Hill, North Carolina
- Coordinates: 36°15′29″N 80°53′26″W
- Country: United States
- State: North Carolina
- County: Wilkes

Area
  - Total: 2.59 sq mi (6.70 km^{2})
  - Land: 2.58 sq mi (6.69 km^{2})
  - Water: 0 sq mi (0.00 km^{2})
- Elevation: 1,125 ft (343 m)

Population (2020)
  - Total: 831
  - Density: 321.5/sq mi (124.14/km^{2})
- Time zone: UTC-5 (Eastern (EST))
  - Summer (DST): UTC-4 (EDT)
- FIPS code: 37-52920
- GNIS feature ID: 2403430

Pleasant Hill is a census-designated place (CDP) in Wilkes County, North Carolina, United States. The population was 1,109 at the 2000 census. It is located adjacent to Elkin.

== Geography ==
According to the United States Census Bureau, the CDP has a total area of 3.6 square miles (9.3 km^{2}), of which 3.6 square miles (9.3 km^{2}) is land and 0.04 square mile (0.1 km^{2}) (0.55%) is water.

== Demographics ==
Historical population
Census	Pop.	Note	%±
2000	1,109		—
2010	878		−20.8%
2020	831		−5.4%
U.S. Decennial Census

As of the census of 2000, there were 1,109 people, 481 households, and 353 families residing in the CDP. The population density was 309.2 inhabitants per square mile (119.4/km^{2}). There were 522 housing units at an average density of 145.5 per square mile (56.2/km^{2}). The racial makeup of the CDP was 99.19% White, 0.09% African American, 0.09% Native American, 0.18% Asian, 0.09% from other races, and 0.36% from two or more races. Hispanic or Latino of any race were 0.54% of the population.

There were 481 households, out of which 24.7% had children under the age of 18 living with them, 60.3% were married couples living together, 8.7% had a female householder with no husband present, and 26.6% were non-families. 25.6% of all households were made up of individuals, and 13.1% had someone living alone who was 65 years of age or older. The average household size was 2.31 and the average family size was 2.74.

In the CDP, the population was spread out, with 19.9% under the age of 18, 6.6% from 18 to 24, 29.0% from 25 to 44, 24.2% from 45 to 64, and 20.3% who were 65 years of age or older. The median age was 42 years. For every 100 females, there were 96.6 males. For every 100 females age 18 and over, there were 93.5 males.

The median income for a household in the CDP was $29,643, and the median income for a family was $43,750. Males had a median income of $27,917 versus $24,779 for females. The per capita income for the CDP was $19,530. About 7.0% of families and 7.6% of the population were below the poverty line, including 6.7% of those under age 18 and 13.6% of those age 65 or over.
