= W. Kerr Scott Dam and Reservoir =

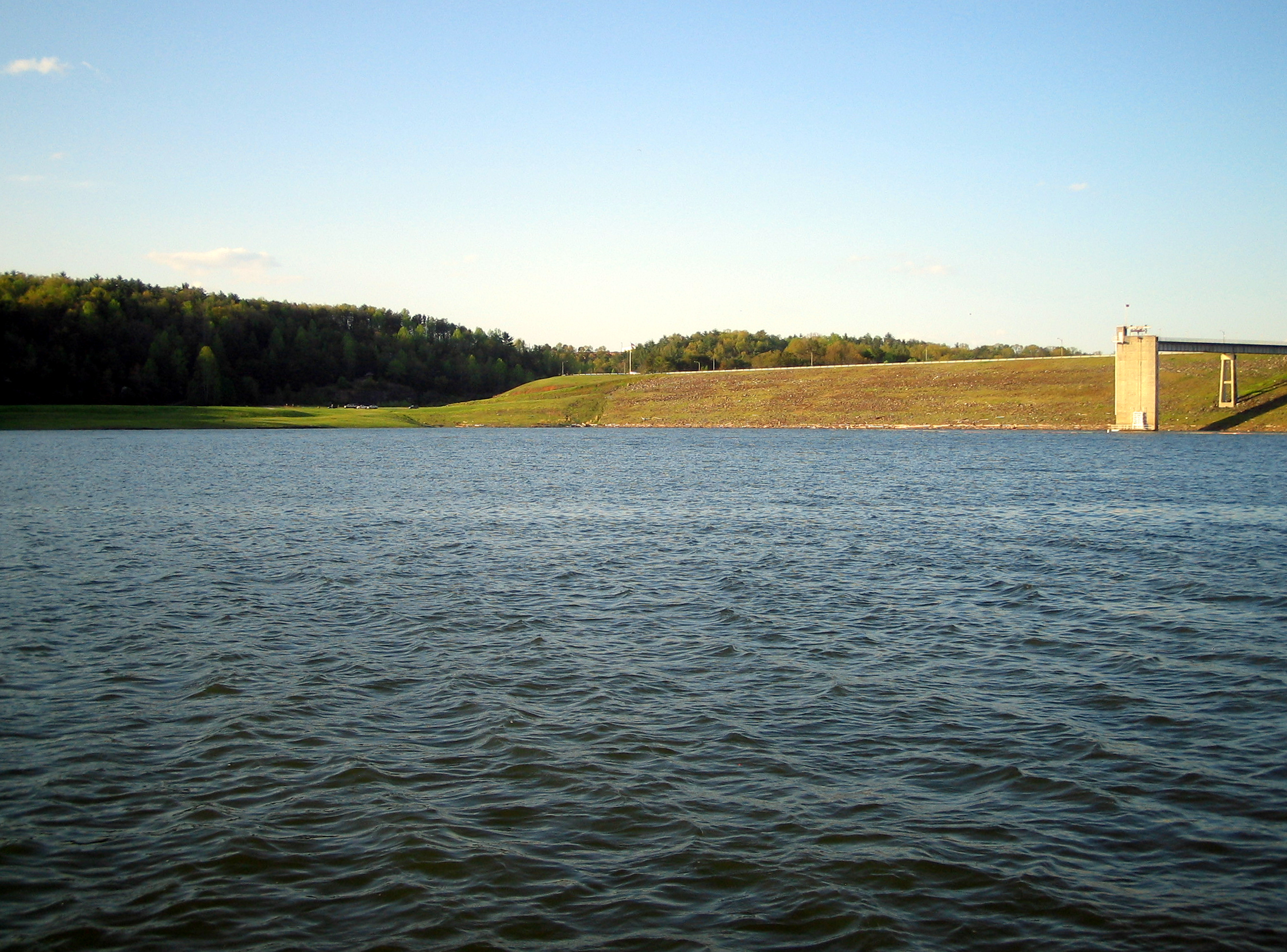
- W. Kerr Scott Dam and Reservoir

- Location within North Carolina Location within the United States
- Location: Wilkes County, North Carolina
- Coordinates: 36°7′58″N 81°13′47.51″W
- Type: reservoir
- Primary inflows: Yadkin River
- Primary outflows: Yadkin River
- Basin countries: United States
- Surface area: 1,475 acres (5.97 km^{2})
- Surface elevation: 1,027 ft (313 m)

The W. Kerr Scott Dam and Reservoir is a 1,475-acre (5.97 km^{2}) artificial lake impounded by a dam located in Wilkes County, North Carolina. It is located on the Yadkin River system, and is operated and managed by the U.S. Army Corps of Engineers.

== Recreation ==
The lake is open to the public for recreational fishing and boating. It is particularly noted for its excellent bass fishing.

== History ==
Scott Dam was completed in 1962 to control flooding that had frequently been a problem in the area. It was named for W. Kerr Scott, the 62nd Governor of North Carolina, who played a key role in the project. The lake has a shoreline of 56 miles.
