= Fairplains, North Carolina =

- CDP
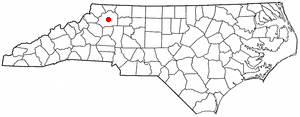
- Location of Fairplains, North Carolina
- Coordinates: 36°11′37″N 81°09′52″W
- Country: United States
- State: North Carolina
- County: Wilkes

Area
  - Total: 4.20 sq mi (10.89 km^{2})
  - Land: 4.20 sq mi (10.89 km^{2})
  - Water: 0 sq mi (0.00 km^{2})
- Elevation: 1,234 ft (376 m)

Population (2020)
  - Total: 2,029
  - Density: 482.4/sq mi (186.24/km^{2})
- Time zone: UTC-5 (Eastern (EST))
  - Summer (DST): UTC-4 (EDT)
- ZIP code: 28659
- Area code: 336
- FIPS code: 37-22380
- GNIS feature ID: 2402471

Fairplains is a census-designated place (CDP) in Wilkes County, North Carolina, United States. The population was 2,029 at the 2020 census. The community was named "fairplains" because it was located at the geographic point where the foothills of the Blue Ridge Mountains begin to level off to the gently rolling Piedmont region of central North Carolina.

== Geography ==
According to the United States Census Bureau, the CDP has a total area of 4.2 square miles (11 km^{2}), all land.

== Demographics ==
Historical population
Census	Pop.	Note	%±
2020	2,029		—
U.S. Decennial Census

=== 2020 census ===
As of the 2020 census, Fairplains had a population of 2,029. The median age was 40.8 years. 23.3% of residents were under the age of 18 and 19.4% of residents were 65 years of age or older. For every 100 females there were 93.8 males, and for every 100 females age 18 and over there were 94.4 males age 18 and over.

97.6% of residents lived in urban areas, while 2.4% lived in rural areas.

There were 835 households in Fairplains, of which 28.5% had children under the age of 18 living in them. Of all households, 41.2% were married-couple households, 20.0% were households with a male householder and no spouse or partner present, and 31.3% were households with a female householder and no spouse or partner present. About 32.5% of all households were made up of individuals and 17.0% had someone living alone who was 65 years of age or older.

There were 939 housing units, of which 11.1% were vacant. The homeowner vacancy rate was 1.6% and the rental vacancy rate was 2.6%.

Fairplains racial composition
Race	Number	Percentage
White (non-Hispanic)	1,391	68.56%
Black or African American (non-Hispanic)	215	10.6%
Asian	7	0.34%
Pacific Islander	1	0.05%
Other/Mixed	81	3.99%
Hispanic or Latino	334	16.46%

=== 2000 census ===
As of the 2000 census, there were 2,051 people, 886 households, and 608 families residing in the CDP. The population density was 482.1 inhabitants per square mile (186.1/km^{2}). There were 974 housing units at an average density of 228.9 per square mile (88.4/km^{2}). The racial makeup of the CDP was 80.16% White, 14.97% African American, 0.10% Native American, 0.29% Asian, 3.66% from other races, and 0.83% from two or more races. Hispanic or Latino of any race were 6.92% of the population.

There were 886 households, out of which 26.3% had children under the age of 18 living with them, 52.7% were married couples living together, 10.9% had a female householder with no husband present, and 31.3% were non-families. 27.4% of all households were made up of individuals, and 11.5% had someone living alone who was 65 years of age or older. The average household size was 2.31 and the average family size was 2.80.

In the CDP, the population was spread out, with 20.1% under the age of 18, 8.3% from 18 to 24, 28.8% from 25 to 44, 25.5% from 45 to 64, and 17.4% who were 65 years of age or older. The median age was 40 years. For every 100 females, there were 92.8 males. For every 100 females age 18 and over, there were 92.4 males.

The median income for a household in the CDP was $28,563, and the median income for a family was $31,466. Males had a median income of $26,103 versus $21,295 for females. The per capita income for the CDP was $14,972. About 13.5% of families and 18.8% of the population were below the poverty line, including 23.7% of those under age 18 and 25.1% of those age 65 or over.
