= State Road, North Carolina =

State Road
- Unincorporated community
- Location within the state of North Carolina
- Coordinates: 36°23′47″N 80°53′32″W
- Country: United States
- State: North Carolina
- County: Surry & Wilkes

Area
  - Total: 26 sq mi (68 km^{2})

Population (2020)
  - Total: 6,022
  - Density: 230/sq mi (89/km^{2})
- Time zone: UTC-5 (Eastern (EST))
  - Summer (DST): UTC-4 (EDT)
- ZIP codes: 28676

State Road is an unincorporated community located in the Bryan Township of Surry County, North Carolina and part of Edwards Township in eastern Wilkes County, North Carolina, United States. As of the 2020 census, the State Road postal district (28676) had a total population of 6,022. The community's unique name is derived from its location on U.S. Route 21. Legend has it that when US 21 was first being built, locals constructed a horseshoe pit on the graded road surface. On Sunday afternoons when they got together to pitch horseshoes, they would say "let's go to state road" and the name stuck.

== Geography ==
State Road is located at 36°17' North, 80°51' West (36.396418 N, 80.89226 W)

According to the United States Census Bureau, the community has a total area of 26.26 square miles (68.0 km^{2}). The Community is serviced by State Road Vol. Fire Dept. Founded in 1960.
