= Stone Mountain State Park =

State park in Alleghany County and Wilkes County, North Carolina

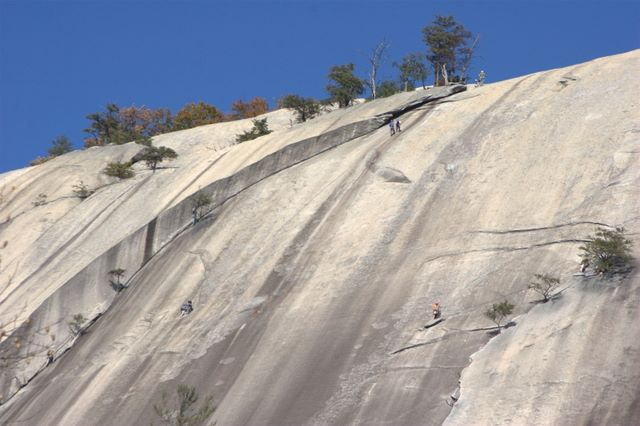
- Climbers ascending Stone Mountain

- Location within North Carolina Location within the United States
- Interactive map of Stone Mountain State Park
- Location: Alleghany and Wilkes counties, North Carolina, United States
- Coordinates: 36°23′14″N 81°01′38″W
- Area: 14,353 acres (5,808 ha)
- Elevation: 2,305 ft (703 m)
- Established: 1969
- Administrator: North Carolina Division of Parks and Recreation
- Website: Official website

Stone Mountain State Park is a 14,353-acre (5,808 ha) North Carolina state park in Alleghany County and Wilkes County, North Carolina, United States.

== Stone Mountain ==
The centerpiece of the park is Stone Mountain, a dome of exposed granite (specifically a quartz diorite to granodiorite) of Devonian age, which has intruded into the gneiss of the Precambrian Alligator Back Formation. It rises sharply over 600 feet (183 m) above the surrounding terrain. The mountain, which has an elevation of 2,305 feet (706 m) above sea level, is known for its barren sides and distinctive brown-gray color, and can be seen for miles. The mountain offers some of the best rock climbing in North Carolina, and the park's creeks and streams feature excellent brook trout fishing.

Because the mountain is the best example of a monadnock in massive granite in North Carolina it was designated a National Natural Landmark in May 1974.

== Museums and historic site ==
The park visitor center features the Mountain Culture Exhibit including mountain settler life and artifacts, and natural history including trout, butterflies and moths.

The mid-19th century Hutchinson Homestead includes a log cabin, barn, blacksmith shop, corncrib, meat house, and original furnishings. The Homestead is open Thursday through Sunday from March – October. The grounds can be visited year round.

The 1897 Garden Creek Baptist Church continues to hold services seasonally. Visitors can walk the grounds when the church is closed.

== Things to do ==
Park activities include rock climbing, hiking (20 miles of trails), horseback riding (10 miles of trails) and camping. There are woodland lakes, waterfalls, and lush forests.

== Gallery ==
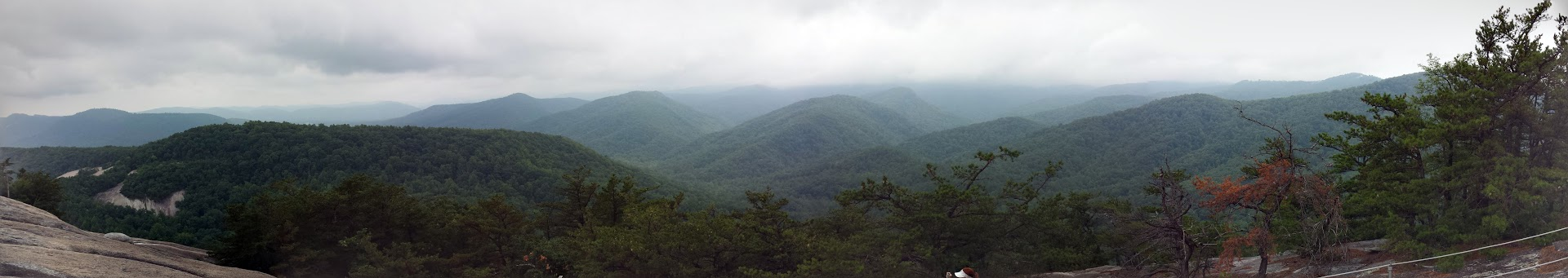
Panoramic Picture from the Top of Stone Mountain, NC

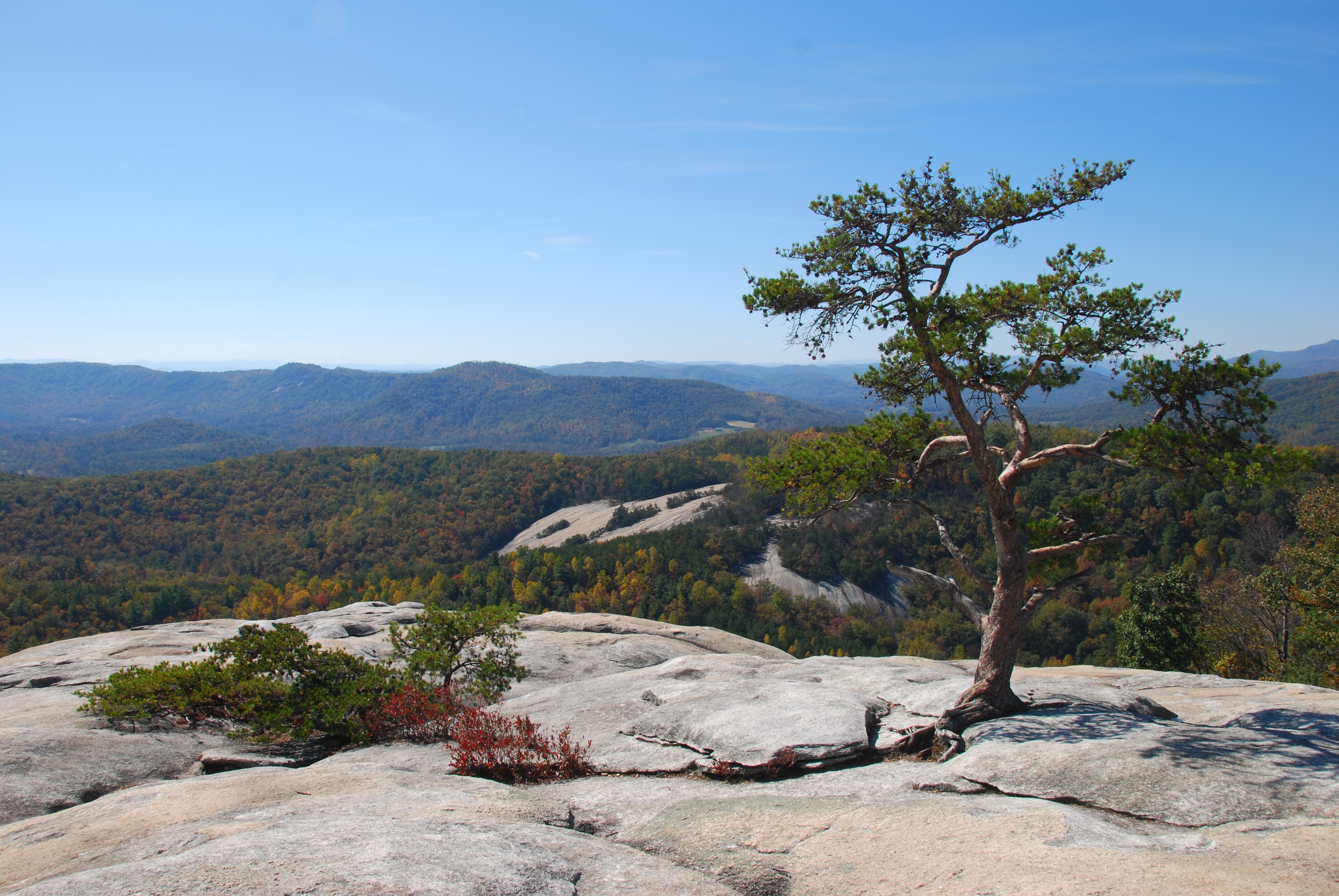
An isolated pine tree on Stone Mountain

View from the bottom of Stone Mountain State Park Waterfall

View from the bottom of Stone Mountain State Park Waterfall

View from the bottom of Stone Mountain State Park Waterfall

View from top of Stone Mountain Falls, NC

View from top of Stone Mountain Falls, NC
