= Stone Mountain (North Carolina) =

Mountain in Wilkes County, North Carolina, United States

Coordinates: 36°23′37″N 81°02′36″W

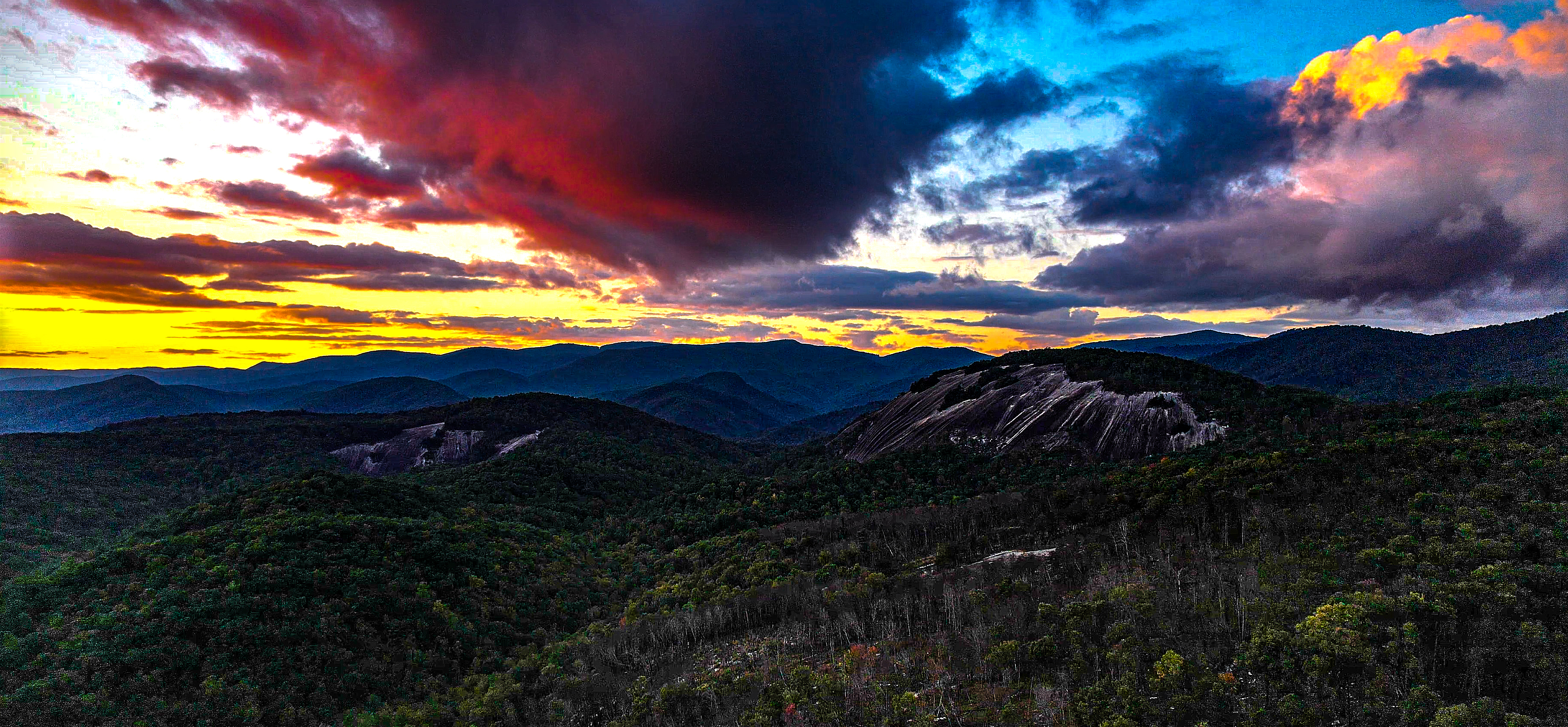
- Stone Mountain view from the park falls.

Highest point
- Elevation: 2,305 ft (703 m)
- Prominence: 600 ft (180 m)

Geography
- Location: Alleghany / Wilkes counties, North Carolina, U.S.
- Parent range: Blue Ridge Mountains

Climbing
- Easiest route: Hike or rock climb

U.S. National Natural Landmark
- Designated: 1974

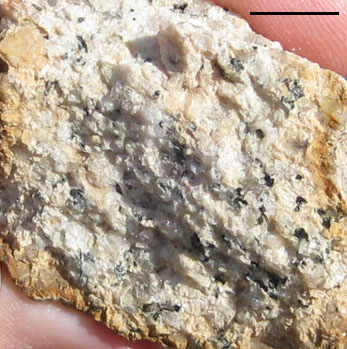
Sample of the granodiorite. Scale bar in upper right is 1 cm.

Stone Mountain is the centerpiece of Stone Mountain State Park in North Carolina. It is a dome of exposed granite (specifically a quartz diorite to granodiorite) of Devonian age, which has intruded into the gneiss of the Precambrian Alligator Back Formation. It rises sharply over 600 feet (183 m) above the surrounding terrain. The mountain, which has an elevation of 2,305 feet (706 m) above sea level, is known for its barren sides and distinctive brown-gray color, and can be seen for miles. The mountain offers some of the best rock climbing in North Carolina, and the park's creeks and streams feature excellent brook trout fishing.

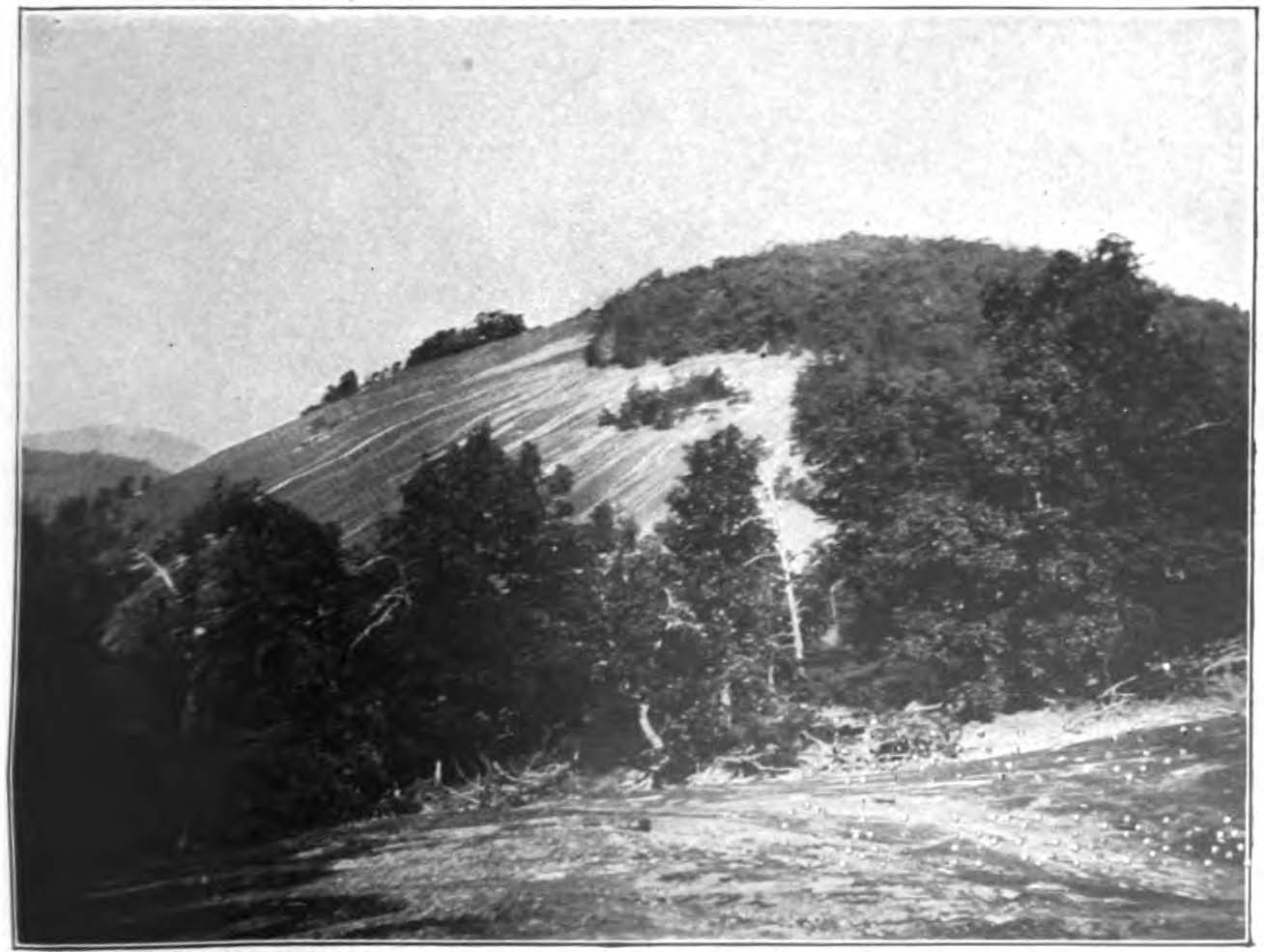
Stone Mountain c. 1910

Because the mountain is the best example of a monadnock in massive granite in North Carolina it was designated a National Natural Landmark in May 1974.
