= Wilkes County, North Carolina =

County in North Carolina, United States

- County
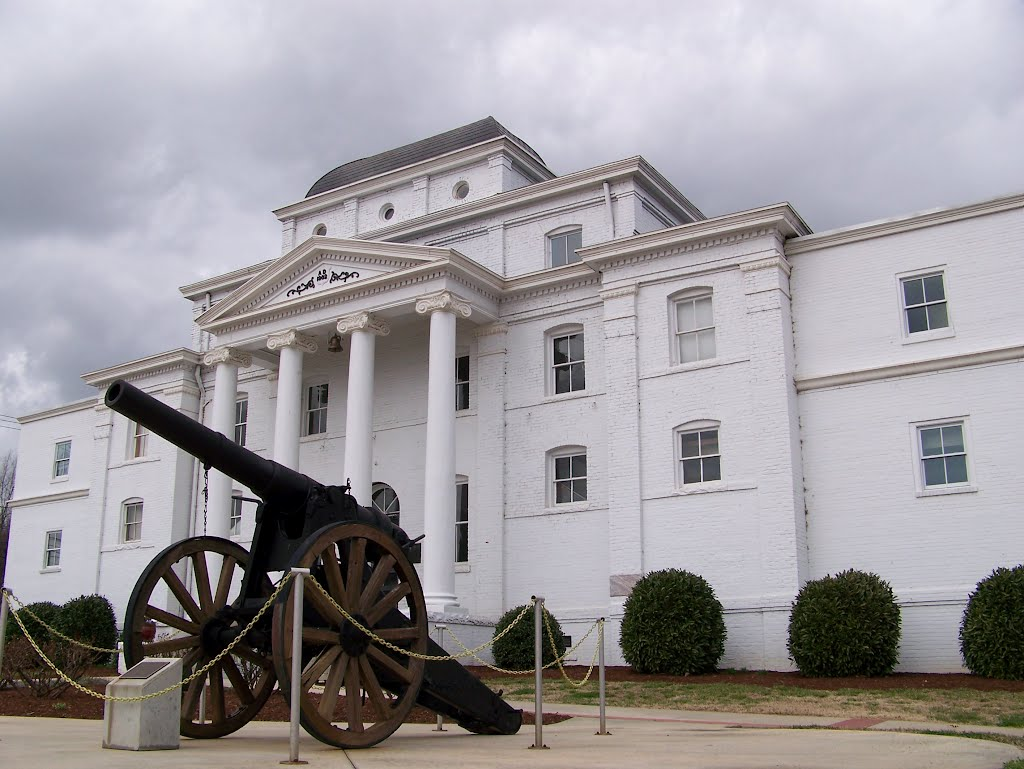
- Old Wilkes County Courthouse

- Seal
- Motto: "Imperium Intra Imperio" (Latin) (Empire Within Empire)
- Location within the U.S. state of North Carolina
- Coordinates: 36.21°N 81.17°W
- Country: United States
- State: North Carolina
- Founded: April 20, 1778
- Named for: John Wilkes
- Seat: Wilkesboro
- Largest community: North Wilkesboro

Area
  - Total: 756.33 sq mi (1,958.9 km^{2})
  - Land: 753.68 sq mi (1,952.0 km^{2})
  - Water: 2.65 sq mi (6.9 km^{2}) 0.35%

Population (2020)
  - Total: 65,969
  - Estimate (2025): 66,233 ▲
  - Density: 86.38/sq mi (33.35/km^{2})
- Time zone: UTC−5 (Eastern)
  - Summer (DST): UTC−4 (EDT)
- Congressional district: 5th
- Website: www.wilkescounty.net

Wilkes County is a county located in the U.S. state of North Carolina. It is a part of the state's western mountain region. The population was 65,969 at the 2020 census. Its county seat is Wilkesboro, and its largest community is North Wilkesboro. Wilkes County comprises the North Wilkesboro, NC Micropolitan Statistical Area.

== History ==
At the time of first European contact in the region, the area which eventually became Wilkes County was occupied by the Cherokee and Catawba indigenous peoples. The first European settler, Christopher Gist, moved to the area in 1750.

The county was formed from parts of Surry County and the District of Washington by an act of the North Carolina General Assembly effective February 15, 1778. The chief lobbyist for its creation was Benjamin Cleveland, a Patriot militiaman of the American Revolution. It was named for John Wilkes, a British politician whom the Americans viewed as a proponent of liberty owing to his conflicts with the Tories in the British Parliament. The first county court was held at John Brown's house in March 1778, and thereafter several boards of commissioners were appointed to select a site for permanent government facilities. By 1801, a courthouse had been erected and the town of Wilkesborough was laid out around it. A portion of Burke County was annexed by Wilkes in 1789. Part of Wilkes was annexed by Surry in 1792. That year, a portion of Washington County, Tennessee, was ceded to North Carolina and incorporated into Wilkes. A portion of Wilkes was split off and joined with Iredell County in 1793. A section of Wilkes was split off in 1797 to form Ashe County.

Early economic activity in Wilkes chiefly comprised agriculture. Poor transportation links with the surrounding region limited the county's opportunities for trade. Wilkesborough was formally incorporated as Wilkesboro in 1847. In 1841, parts of Wilkes County and Burke County were combined to form Caldwell County. In 1847, another part of Wilkes County was combined with parts of Caldwell County and Iredell County to become Alexander County. In 1849, additional parts of Wilkes County and Caldwell County were combined with parts of Ashe County and Yancey County to form Watauga County. Numerous boundary adjustments were made thereafter.

=== Moonshine production and the birth of NASCAR ===
Wilkes County was once known as the "Moonshine Capital of the World", and was a leading producer of illegal homemade liquor. From the 1920s to the 1950s some young Wilkes County males made their living by delivering moonshine to North Carolina's larger towns and cities. Wilkes County natives also used bootleg liquor as a means for barter far beyond the borders of North Carolina. Many Wilkes County distillers ran white liquor as far as Detroit, New Jersey, and South Florida. Since this often involved outrunning local police and federal agents in auto chases, the county became one of the birthplaces of the sport of stock-car racing.

The North Wilkesboro Speedway was the first NASCAR (National Association of Stock Car Auto Racing) track; it held its first race on May 18, 1947, and the first NASCAR-sanctioned race on October 16, 1949. Wilkes County native and resident Junior Johnson was one of the early superstars of NASCAR, as well as a legendary moonshiner. Johnson was featured by the writer Tom Wolfe in a 1965 Esquire magazine article titled "The Last American Hero Is Junior Johnson. Yes!", which gave him national exposure. Wolfe's vivid article was later adapted as the movie The Last American Hero (1973), starring Jeff Bridges and Valerie Perrine. Benny Parsons and Jimmy Pardue were two other notable NASCAR drivers from Wilkes.

The North Wilkesboro Speedway was closed following the 1996 NASCAR season. Two new owners, Bob Bahre and Bruton Smith, moved North Wilkesboro's NASCAR races to their tracks in Texas and New Hampshire. In 2009, Speedway Associates, Inc., obtained a three-year lease and started running races and other events at the speedway. However, in May 2011, the group announced that funding had fallen through and they were ending their lease prematurely. Following the track's closure in 1996, numerous news media stories and articles were written about the rich history of the speedway, the physical decay of the track and grandstands, and efforts to renovate and save the speedway. In November 2021, the North Carolina state legislature and North Carolina Governor Roy Cooper approved giving $18 million to the North Wilkesboro Speedway for extensive renovations and repairs in an effort to return auto racing to the track. Following the renovation, the Speedway held its first races in a decade in August 2022, drawing a sellout crowd to the CARS Tour's Window World 125. In September 2022 it was announced that the 2023 NASCAR All-Star Race would be held at the North Wilkesboro Speedway in May 2023, marking the first NASCAR race to be held at the track since 1996. The All-Star race was held on May 21, 2023, before a sellout crowd at the Speedway, Kyle Larson won the race. The NASCAR Craftsman Truck Series also held a race at the Speedway on May 20, 2023; it was also won by Kyle Larson. The 2024 NASCAR All-Star race was also held at the North Wilkesboro Speedway in May 2024, and the 2025 NASCAR All-Star race was held at the Speedway in May 2025.

In August 2025, NASCAR announced that the North Wilkesboro Speedway will lose the NASCAR All-Star race, but will add a points race for the first time in thirty years in July 2026. The Speedway will host a NASCAR Cup series race on July 19, 2026; NASCAR officials stated that the success of the three All-Star races at the track justified returning a points race to the speedway. The July 2026 points race will be called the Window World 450, after its corporate sponsor.

== Geography ==
Interactive map of Wilkes County

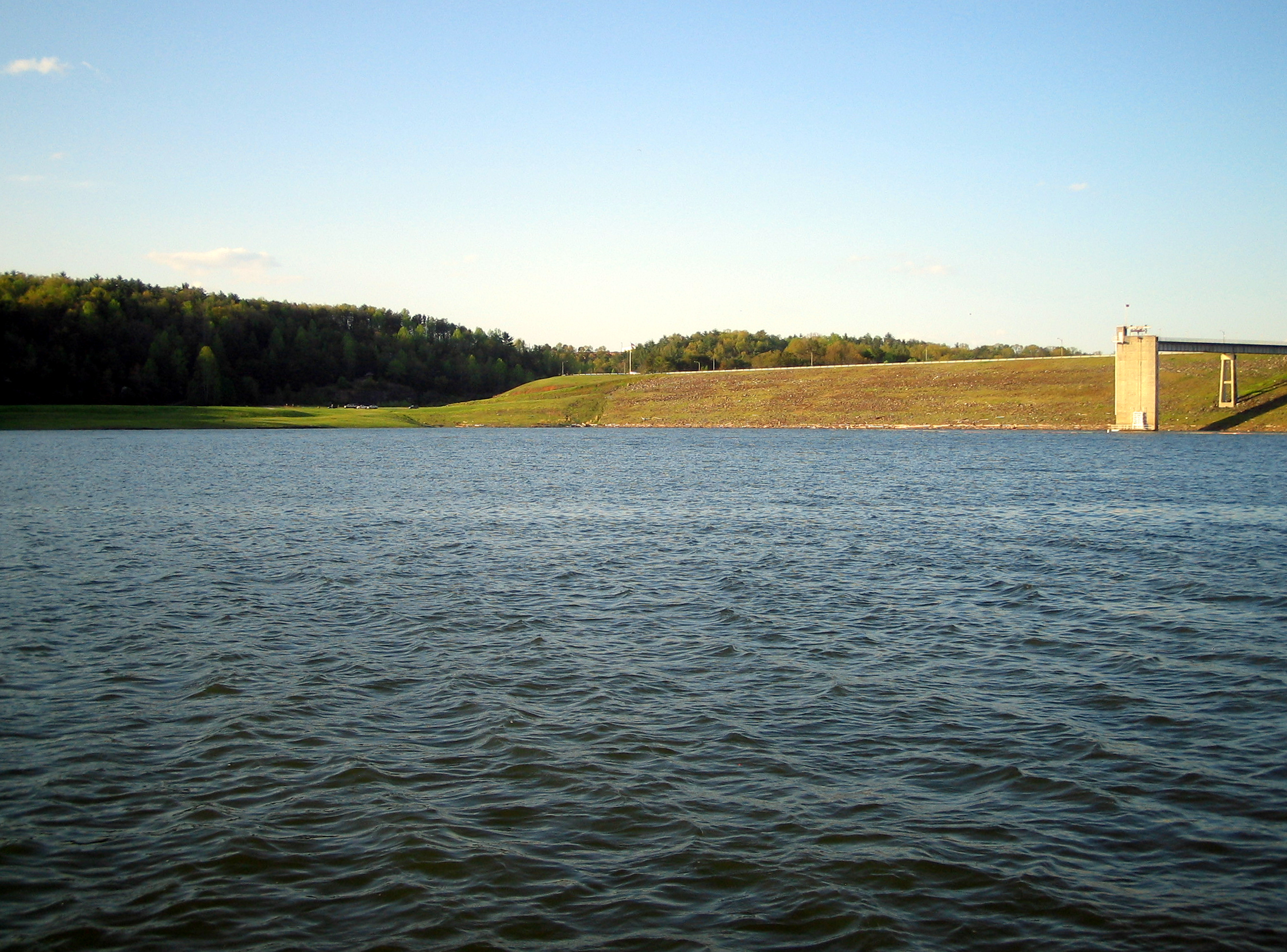
W. Kerr Scott Dam and Reservoir

According to the U.S. Census Bureau, the county has a total area of 756.33 square miles (1,958.9 km^{2}), of which 753.68 square miles (1,952.0 km^{2}) is land and 2.65 square miles (6.9 km^{2}) (0.35%) is water.

Wilkes County is located on the eastern slope of the Blue Ridge Mountains, a part of the Appalachian Mountains chain. The county's elevation ranges from 900 feet (270 meters) in the east to over 4,000 feet (1,200 meters) in the west. The Blue Ridge Mountains run from the southwest to the northeast, and dominate the county's western and northern horizons. Tomkins Knob, the highest point in the county, rises to 4,079 feet (1,243 meters). The Blue Ridge Parkway runs along the crest of the Blue Ridge on the county's northern and western borders. The foothills and valleys of the Blue Ridge form most of the county's midsection, with some elevations exceeding 2,000 feet (610 meters). Stone Mountain State Park, located in the foothills of northern Wilkes County, is one of the most popular state parks in North Carolina, and is noted for its excellent rock climbing and trout fishing. The Brushy Mountains, an isolated spur of the Blue Ridge, form the county's southern border. Wilkes County's terrain gradually becomes more level and less hilly as one moves to the east; the far eastern section of the county lies within the Piedmont region of North Carolina. The largest river in Wilkes is the Yadkin River, which flows through the central part of the county. The county's three other major streams, all of which flow into the Yadkin, are the Reddies River, Roaring River, and Mulberry Creek. Following the devastating floods of 1916 and 1940, the US Army's Corps of Engineers constructed the W. Kerr Scott Dam and Reservoir on the Yadkin River four miles west of Wilkesboro. Opened in 1962, the dam created a lake with a shoreline of 56 miles. The lake is used for boating, swimming, fishing, and waterskiing; it is especially noted for its excellent bass fishing. The W. Kerr Scott lake is the largest body of water in Wilkes.

=== Climate ===
Due to its wide range of elevation, Wilkes County's climate varies considerably. In winter, it is not unusual for it to be sunny with the temperature in the forties in the county's eastern section, while at the same time it is snowing or sleeting with the temperature below freezing in the county's mountainous north, west, and south. Generally speaking, Wilkes receives ample amounts of precipitation, with frequent thunderstorms in the spring and summer months; and rain, snow, sleet, and freezing rain all occur at times during the winter, with the frequency increasing with the altitude. Wilkesboro, the county seat, receives an average of 50 inches of rain per year and an average of 10 inches of snow. Severe weather is not common in Wilkes but does occur. Tornadoes are rare, but severe thunderstorms can bring strong winds which can down trees and power lines, as well as cause hail. On October 23, 2017, a rare EF 1 tornado touched down in the community of Moravian Falls, before moving into the towns of Wilkesboro and North Wilkesboro, and then through the Mulberry, Fairplains, and Hays communities, causing significant damage. Wilkes County is far enough inland that hurricanes rarely cause problems, but a strong hurricane which moves inland quickly enough may cause damage, as with Hurricane Hugo in 1989 and Hurricane Helene in 2024. Due to the numerous creeks and streams which run through its valleys, Wilkes is especially prone to devastating flash floods. The two most memorable floods occurred in 1916 and 1940, killing a number of residents and causing millions of dollars in damages. After the opening of the W. Kerr Scott Dam in 1962, the Yadkin River did not flood again in Wilkes County until heavy rainfalls from Hurricane Helene led to flooding in 2024. Although Wilkes County has never had a severe earthquake, a fault runs through the Brushy Mountains, and mild earth tremors are not uncommon. On August 31, 1861, an earthquake estimated at 5.0 on the Richter magnitude scale hit the southern part of the county and caused minor damage.

=== National protected areas ===
- Blue Ridge Parkway (part)
- Doughton Recreation Area (part)
- E.B. Jeffress Park

=== State and local protected areas ===
- Buffalo Cove Game Land (part)
- Kerr Scott Game Land
- Rendezvous Mountain State Forest Game Land
- Rendezvous Mountain State Park
- Stone Mountain State Park (part)
- Thurmond Chatham Game Land (part)

=== Major water bodies ===
- Big Sandy Creek
- Big Warrior Creek
- Brier Creek
- Coal Creek
- Cub Creek
- Dugger Creek
- East Prong Roaring River
- Elk Creek
- Elkin Creek
- Fall Creek
- Fishing Creek
- Grassy Fork
- Hunting Creek
- Little Dugger Creek
- Little Elkin Creek
- Little Hunting Creek
- Lousy Creek
- Mulberry Creek
- Osborn Creek
- North Fork Reddies River
- North Little Hunting Creek
- Reddies River
- Roaring River
- Sandy Creek
- South Fork Reddies River
- W. Kerr Scott Dam and Reservoir
- Yadkin River
- Yates Creek

=== Adjacent counties ===
- Alexander County – south
- Alleghany County – north
- Ashe County – northwest
- Caldwell County – southwest
- Iredell County – southeast
- Surry County – northeast
- Watauga County – west
- Yadkin County – east

=== Major highways ===
- US 21
- US 421
- US 421 Bus.
- NC 16
- NC 18
- NC 115
- NC 268
- NC 268A (alternative route)
- NC 268 Bus.

Wilkes County is home to several NC and US highways, as well as an airport and public transportation. Wilkes is also one of 27 North Carolina counties in which the Blue Ridge Parkway runs through.

=== Major infrastructure ===
- North Wilkesboro Speedway, famous speedway in Wilkes County
- Wilkes County Airport
- Wilkes Transportation Authority, serves Wilkes County with buses and vans along a scheduled route and rural service

== Demographics ==
Historical population
Census	Pop.	Note	%±
1790	8,157		—
1800	7,247		−11.2%
1810	9,054		24.9%
1820	9,967		10.1%
1830	11,968		20.1%
1840	12,577		5.1%
1850	12,099		−3.8%
1860	14,749		21.9%
1870	15,539		5.4%
1880	19,181		23.4%
1890	22,675		18.2%
1900	26,872		18.5%
1910	30,282		12.7%
1920	32,644		7.8%
1930	36,162		10.8%
1940	43,003		18.9%
1950	45,243		5.2%
1960	45,269		0.1%
1970	49,524		9.4%
1980	58,657		18.4%
1990	59,393		1.3%
2000	65,352		10.0%
2010	69,340		6.1%
2020	65,969		−4.9%
2025 (est.)	66,233	▲	0.4%
U.S. Decennial Census; 1790–1960 1900–1990; 1990–2000 2010 2020

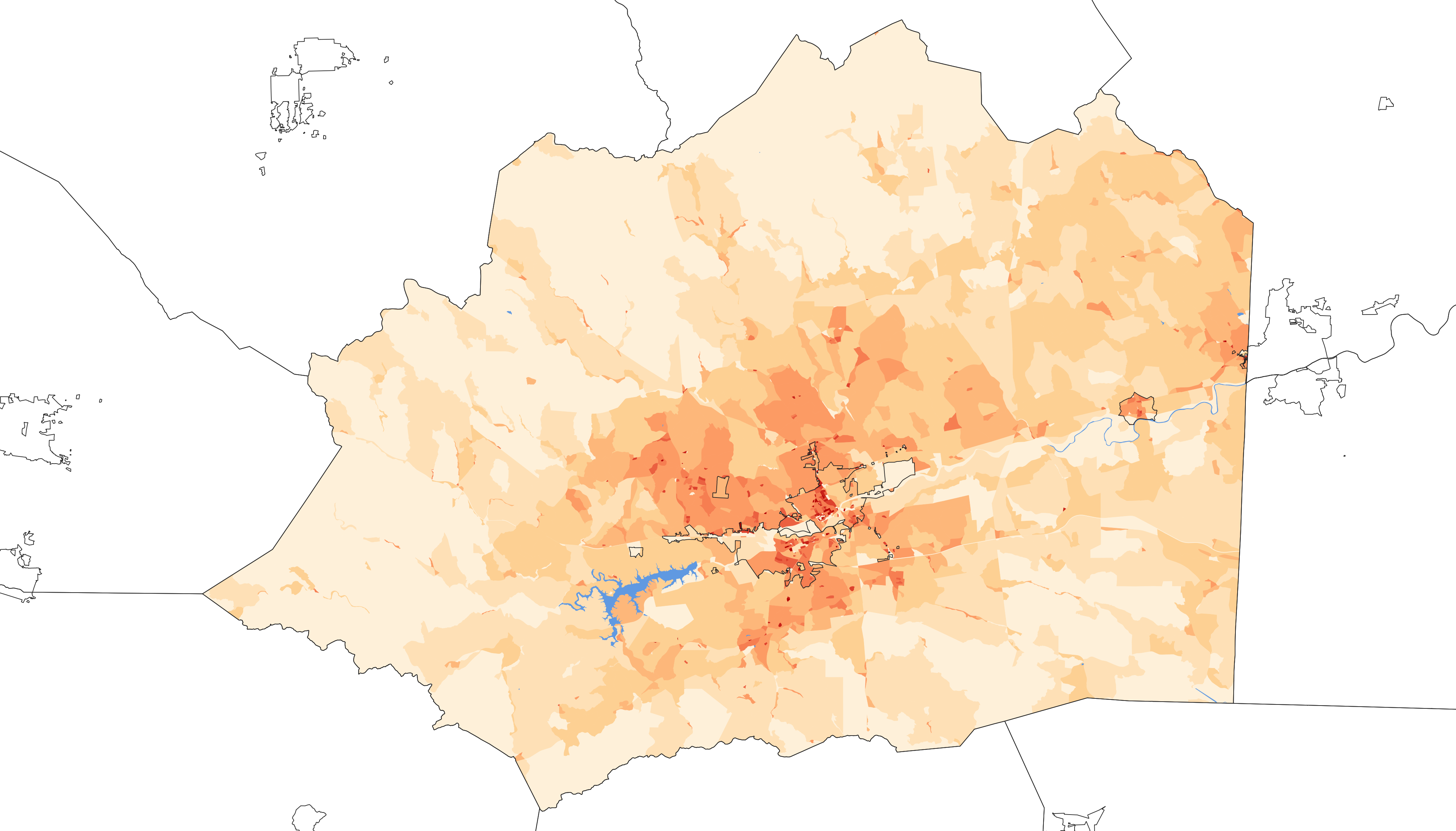
2020 population density of Wilkes County NC by census block

=== Racial and ethnic composition ===
Wilkes County, North Carolina – Racial and ethnic composition Note: the US Census treats Hispanic/Latino as an ethnic category. This table excludes Latinos from the racial categories and assigns them to a separate category. Hispanics/Latinos may be of any race.
Race / Ethnicity (NH = Non-Hispanic)	Pop 1980	Pop 1990	Pop 2000	Pop 2010	Pop 2020	% 1980	% 1990	% 2000	% 2010	% 2020
White alone (NH)	55,326	56,044	59,977	61,587	56,316	94.32%	94.36%	91.38%	88.82%	85.37%
Black or African American alone (NH)	2,760	2,818	2,719	2,785	2,580	4.71%	4.74%	4.14%	4.02%	3.91%
Native American or Alaska Native alone (NH)	57	62	84	110	86	0.10%	0.10%	0.13%	0.16%	0.13%
Asian alone (NH)	44	97	213	295	324	0.08%	0.16%	0.32%	0.43%	0.49%
Native Hawaiian or Pacific Islander alone (NH)	x	x	6	15	5	x	x	0.01%	0.02%	0.01%
Other race alone (NH)	29	10	35	67	131	0.05%	0.02%	0.05%	0.10%	0.20%
Mixed race or Multiracial (NH)	x	x	336	709	1,873	x	x	0.51%	1.02%	2.84%
Hispanic or Latino (any race)	441	362	2,262	3,772	4,654	0.75%	0.61%	3.45%	5.44%	7.05%
Total	58,657	59,393	65,632	69,340	65,969	100.00%	100.00%	100.00%	100.00%	100.00%

=== 2020 census ===
As of the 2020 census, there were 65,969 people, 27,612 households, and 17,409 families residing in the county.

The median age was 45.7 years; 20.2% of residents were under the age of 18 and 22.5% were 65 years of age or older. For every 100 females there were 97.0 males, and for every 100 females age 18 and over there were 95.4 males.

The racial makeup of the county was 86.6% White, 4.0% Black or African American, 0.3% American Indian and Alaska Native, 0.5% Asian, <0.1% Native Hawaiian and Pacific Islander, 4.1% from some other race, and 4.5% from two or more races. Hispanic or Latino residents of any race comprised 7.1% of the population.

30.2% of residents lived in urban areas, while 69.8% lived in rural areas.

There were 31,545 housing units, of which 12.5% were vacant. Among occupied housing units, 73.6% were owner-occupied and 26.4% were renter-occupied. The homeowner vacancy rate was 1.1% and the rental vacancy rate was 6.6%.

=== 2010 census ===
At the 2010 census, there were 69,340 people, 28,360 households, and 19,683 families residing in the county. The population density was 91.91 people per square mile (35.49 people/km^{2}). There were 33,065 housing units at an average density of 43.84 units per square mile (16.93 units/km^{2}). The racial makeup of the county was 90.60% White or European American, 4.08% African American, 0.19% Native American, 0.43% Asian, 0.03% Pacific Islander, 3.33% from other races, and 1.33% from two or more races. Of all races, 5.44% of the population were Hispanic or Latino.

There were 28,360 households, out of which 26.76% had children under the age of 18 living with them, 54.03% were married couples living together, 10.50% had a female householder with no husband present, and 30.60% were non-families. Of all households, 26.69% were made up of individuals, and 11.59% had someone living alone who was 65 years of age or older. The average household size was 2.41 and the average family size was 2.89.

In the county, the population breakdown by age is: 22.41% under the age of 18, 7.16% from 18 to 24, 23.96% from 25 to 44, 29.49% from 45 to 64, and 16.99% who were 65 years of age or older. The median age was 42.4 years. For every 100 females there were 97.69 males. For every 100 females age 18 and over, there were 95.42 males.

The median income for a household in the county was $30,668, and the median income for a family was $39,670. Males had a median income of $30,917 versus $26,182 for females. The per capita income for the county was $18,319. About 17.60% of families and 21.50% of the population were below the poverty line, including 32.60% of those under age 18 and 13.40% of those age 65 or over.

=== Religion ===
Since colonial times Wilkes County has been overwhelmingly Protestant Christian. The two earliest churches to be established in Wilkes were the Episcopalian and Presbyterian. However, by the 1850s the Southern Baptists had eclipsed them, and the Baptists have remained the dominant church in Wilkes. The county also contains a significant number of Methodist, Presbyterian, Episcopalian, and non-denominational Evangelical Protestant congregations. Historically, few Roman Catholics lived in Wilkes, but recent immigration from other U.S. States and especially by people of Hispanic descent has increased their numbers. Wilkes County has a single Catholic parish, Saint John Baptist de LaSalle Catholic Church in North Wilkesboro, which serves all the Catholics of Wilkes County. In contrast, relatively few Jews or members of other non-Christian faiths have settled in the county.

== Government and politics ==
United States presidential election results for Wilkes County, North Carolina
Year	Republican		Democratic		Third party(ies)	
Year	No.	%	No.	%	No.	%
1880	1,583	51.18%	1,510	48.82%	0	0.00%
1884	2,028	60.20%	1,341	39.80%	0	0.00%
1888	2,292	57.31%	1,691	42.29%	16	0.40%
1892	1,895	49.74%	1,770	46.46%	145	3.81%
1896	2,835	61.07%	1,801	38.80%	6	0.13%
1900	2,840	62.47%	1,704	37.48%	2	0.04%
1904	2,470	65.21%	1,318	34.79%	0	0.00%
1908	3,382	68.34%	1,559	31.50%	8	0.16%
1912	331	7.29%	1,636	36.05%	2,571	56.65%
1916	3,470	68.01%	1,632	31.99%	0	0.00%
1920	6,451	69.41%	2,843	30.59%	0	0.00%
1924	6,131	63.02%	3,586	36.86%	11	0.11%
1928	7,808	73.59%	2,802	26.41%	0	0.00%
1932	6,522	53.64%	5,598	46.04%	39	0.32%
1936	8,358	56.23%	6,506	43.77%	0	0.00%
1940	8,446	53.64%	7,299	46.36%	0	0.00%
1944	9,121	62.01%	5,587	37.99%	0	0.00%
1948	8,234	57.18%	5,784	40.17%	382	2.65%
1952	11,446	61.57%	7,143	38.43%	0	0.00%
1956	11,544	66.29%	5,870	33.71%	0	0.00%
1960	13,016	61.98%	7,986	38.02%	0	0.00%
1964	11,014	54.55%	9,176	45.45%	0	0.00%
1968	11,195	60.29%	4,497	24.22%	2,876	15.49%
1972	13,015	72.69%	4,634	25.88%	255	1.42%
1976	11,768	53.43%	10,176	46.20%	80	0.36%
1980	14,462	62.74%	8,184	35.51%	403	1.75%
1984	18,670	73.03%	6,852	26.80%	42	0.16%
1988	15,231	67.65%	7,230	32.11%	53	0.24%
1992	12,547	52.57%	7,991	33.48%	3,330	13.95%
1996	12,395	58.39%	6,793	32.00%	2,040	9.61%
2000	16,826	69.18%	7,226	29.71%	271	1.11%
2004	19,197	70.70%	7,862	28.95%	95	0.35%
2008	20,288	68.25%	8,934	30.06%	502	1.69%
2012	20,515	70.39%	8,148	27.96%	482	1.65%
2016	23,752	75.89%	6,638	21.21%	906	2.89%
2020	27,592	77.80%	7,511	21.18%	363	1.02%
2024	28,812	79.33%	7,194	19.81%	314	0.86%

Since the American Civil War, Wilkes County has been heavily Republican, owing to its strong Unionist sentiment during the war, which partly stemmed from its rocky and infertile soil unsuited for plantation farming. The last Democratic presidential candidate to carry Wilkes County was Andrew Jackson in 1832. The Whig Party dominated politics in the county from 1836 until its dissolution in the middle 1850s. Since the formation of the Republican Party in 1854, Wilkes County has voted Republican in every election bar three: in 1856 it voted for "Know-Nothing" Millard Fillmore, in 1860 for Constitutional Unionist John Bell, and in 1912 for Progressive Theodore Roosevelt.

The primary governing body of Wilkes County follows a council–manager government format with a five-member board of commissioners and county manager. The current county manager is John Yates. As of 2024, the current commissioners are: Casey Joe Johnson (chairman), Bill Sexton (vice chairman), Giddeon Keith Elmore, Stoney Greene, and Greg Minton.

Wilkes County is a member of the regional High Country Council of Governments.

In the North Carolina General Assembly, Wilkes is represented by Eddie Settle in North Carolina Senate's 36th district, and by Sarah Stevens in the 90th district and Jeffery Elmore in the 94th district of the North Carolina House of Representatives.

In the US Senate, the county is represented by Ted Budd and Thom Tillis. Wilkes is entirely in North Carolina's 5th congressional district of the United States House of Representatives, represented by Virginia Foxx.

Wilkes County's economic struggles since 2000, and the county's strong support for Donald Trump in the 2016 presidential election and after, has led to Wilkes being prominently featured in numerous stories and articles by national news media outlets such as The New York Times, NBC News, PBS NewsHour, U.S. News & World Report, and MSNBC. In 2024, Wilkes County failed to give at least 20% to the Democratic candidate for the first time in history.

== Economy ==
Despite its rural character and relatively small population, Wilkes County has been the birthplace of numerous large industries. Lowe's, the second-largest chain of home-improvement stores in the nation (after The Home Depot) was started in Wilkes County in 1946. Until 2003, Lowe's had its corporate headquarters in Wilkes County, but the company has since relocated most of its corporate functions to Mooresville, North Carolina, a fast-growing suburb of Charlotte. However, Lowe's large office in Wilkesboro still houses many corporate departments, and Lowe's remains the county's second-largest employer. A telecommunications firm, Carolina West Wireless, was started in Wilkesboro in 1991 and is also headquartered in the county.

Other industries which started in Wilkes County are Lowes Foods (now headquartered in Winston-Salem) and The Northwestern Bank, which was once North Carolina's fourth-largest banking chain until it was merged with First Union Bank in 1986. The Carolina Mirror Company in North Wilkesboro, founded in the 1930s, was for many years the largest mirror factory in America. Today Gardner Glass Products Inc. still produces mirrors in North Wilkesboro. Holly Farms, in Wilkesboro, was the largest poultry producer in the Southeastern United States until it was bought by Tyson Foods in 1989. Wilkes County remains one of the largest producers of poultry in the Eastern United States, and many of the county's farmers are poultry farmers for Tyson Foods. Tyson is the largest employer in Wilkes.

Like many rural areas in North Carolina, Wilkes County has suffered since 2000 from the closing of nearly all of its textile and furniture factories, which formed a major part of its economic base. Most of these factories have moved to low-wage locations in Latin America and Asia, especially China and Vietnam. According to Stateline, the number of Wilkes County residents employed in manufacturing dropped from 8,548 in 2000 to approximately 4,000 as of 2015, a reduction of over 53%. From 2000 to 2014, the median household income in Wilkes declined by over 30%. However, from 2014 to 2017 the median household income increased by nearly 22%, and in 2017 Wilkes was ranked 47th out of 100 counties for "economic distress" by the North Carolina Department of Commerce.

=== Wine region ===
Wilkes County is part of the Yadkin Valley AVA, an American Viticultural Area. Wines made from grapes grown in Wilkes County may use the appellation Yadkin Valley on their labels. With the decline of tobacco farming, some Wilkes County farmers have switched to wine-making, and have hired experts from Europe and California for assistance. As a result, wine-making is growing in popularity in both Wilkes and surrounding counties.

In May of each year, Wilkes county celebrates the new wine industry with the Shine to Wine Festival, held in downtown North Wilkesboro.

== Education ==
The Wilkes County Schools system has 22 schools ranging from pre-kindergarten to twelfth grade, including an early college high school. Those 22 schools are separated into 5 high schools, 4 middle schools and 13 elementary schools. There is only one charter school in Wilkes County: Bridges Charter School in State Road, North Carolina. The Elkin City Schools district also covers parts of Wilkes. Wilkes County has three private schools, all three are associated with one of the larger Protestant Christian churches in the county. The largest private school in Wilkes is Millers Creek Christian School. In recent years, the number of students being home schooled in Wilkes has steadily increased, while public school enrollment has decreased. The only college in Wilkes is Wilkes Community College (WCC), a public two-year college within the North Carolina Community College System.

Wilkes County is served by the Appalachian Regional Library.

== Media ==
Wilkes County has two local newspapers:

- Wilkes Journal-Patriot – Founded in 1906, the Journal-Patriot is published one time per week.
- The Record of Wilkes – Published once per week on the internet, it usually focuses on the local arts scene in Wilkes.

The county has three radio stations:

- WKBC-FM (97.3 FM) – Adult contemporary (Hot AC) music and flagship station for football and basketball games of nearby Appalachian State University.
- WKBC (AM) (800 AM) – American country music.
- WWWC (AM) (1240 AM & 100.1 FM) – Southern Gospel music and local news and high school sports broadcasts.

Most of the county can pick up the Television Stations broadcasting from Winston-Salem

Wilkes County is also home to GoWilkes.com, an internet media source that allows residents to discuss current events and local happenings in real time. GoWilkes.com was voted the 2004 Small Business of the Year by the North Carolina Chamber of Commerce.

== Hospitals ==
Wilkes Medical Center was opened in 1952 as Wilkes General Hospital. In 2017, Wake Forest Baptist Health brought the hospital, at the time known as Wilkes Regional Medical Center, into their system. WMC is the largest hospital in northwestern North Carolina and is Wilkes County's fourth largest employer. West Park, formerly a large shopping center built in the 1970s, was, starting in 2000, transformed into a large medical park with numerous offices for physicians, medical specialists, pharmacies, physical therapists, and other medical and health-related fields.

== Events and festivals ==
Wilkes County has strong musical roots, and those roots are displayed at:

It hosts the annual Shine to Wine Festival, in downtown North Wilkesboro. Held on the first Saturday of May, the Shine to Wine festival pays tribute to the county's heritage of growing from the Moonshine Capital of the World to what is now recognized as a strong viticultural industry.

Wilkes County is also home to the annual Brushy Mountain Apple Festival, which is held in downtown North Wilkesboro the first weekend in October. The festival, which attracts over 160,000 visitors each year, is one of the largest single-day arts and crafts fairs in the Southern United States.

Carolina in the Fall is another music festival each September in the Historic Downtown Wilkesboro and is hosted by the Heart of Folk and the Kruger Brothers. The festival and venue won an award at the IBMA and features music, wine and beer garden and food truck competition. It continues to grow in popularity.

The Carolina West Wireless Community Commons and Wilkes Communications Pavilion has "Concerts on the Commons," a live music concert series held from May through October annually.

In 1988 legendary, Grammy-winning folk music guitarist Doc Watson and Bill Young started the Doc Watson Festival (later renamed the MerleFest music festival) in Wilkesboro. Held on the campus of Wilkes Community College, and named in honor of Doc's late son Merle Watson, MerleFest has grown into one of the largest folk and bluegrass music festivals in the United States, drawing an average of over 75,000 music fans each year. The festival has become the main fundraiser for the college, and brings over $10 million in estimated business and tourist revenues to Wilkes County and surrounding areas each year.

== Communities ==
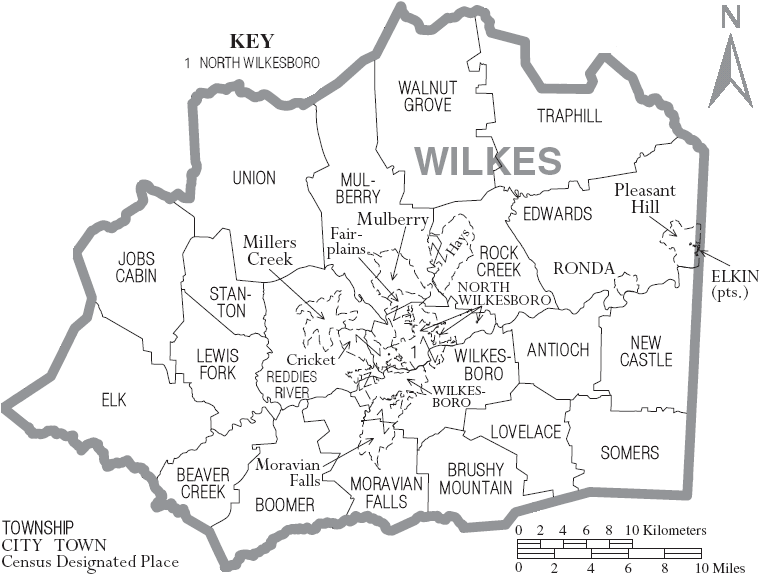
Map of Wilkes County with municipal and township labels

=== Towns ===
- Elkin (also in Surry County)
- North Wilkesboro (largest community)
- Ronda
- Wilkesboro (county seat)

=== Census-designated places ===
- Cricket
- Fairplains
- Hays
- Millers Creek
- Moravian Falls
- Mulberry
- Pleasant Hill

=== Unincorporated communities ===
- Call
- Clingman
- Darby
- Ferguson
- McGrady
- Parsonsville
- Purlear
- Roaring River
- Thurmond
- Knotville
- Cairo
- Flint Hill

=== Townships ===
- Antioch
- Beaver Creek
- Boomer
- Brushy Mountains
- Edwards
- Elk
- Jobs Cabin
- Lewis Fork
- Lovelace
- Moravian Falls
- Mulberry
- New Castle
- North Wilkesboro
- Rock Creek
- Reddies River
- Somers
- Stanton
- Traphill
- Union
- Walnut Grove
- Wilkesboro

== Notable people ==
- Rhoda Bryan Billings (1937-2025) law professor and jurist, the second woman to serve as Chief Justice of the North Carolina Supreme Court
- Daniel Boone (1734–1820), explorer and pioneer, lived in Wilkes County for several years with his wife, Rebecca Bryan Boone also from Davie County, and their children before moving west to Kentucky.
- John Brown (1738–1812), militia captain during the Revolutionary War, served as one of the state Treasurers (1782–1784), and served in the North Carolina state legislature (1784–1787).
- Robert Byrd (1917–2010), U.S. Senator from West Virginia 1959–2010; longest-serving Senator in American history.
- Lady Sarah Lou Harris Carter (1923-2019), Pioneering African-American model who also became known as an entertainer, educator and humanitarian.
- Benjamin Cleveland (1738–1806), colonel in the North Carolina militia during the Revolutionary War. He was one of the American commanders at the Battle of Kings Mountain in 1780.
- Dean Combs (1952) former NASCAR driver
- Tom Dula (Dooley) (1844–1868), Confederate veteran who was tried and hanged for the murder of his fiancée, Laura Foster; subject of the folk ballad "Tom Dooley".
- Jeffrey Elmore (1978) NC Politician
- Zach Galifianakis (born 1969), actor and comedian.
- John A. Garwood (1932-2010), Politician, served in the NC Legislature
- George Allen Gilreath (1834–1863), a captain in the Confederate Army during the American Civil War; killed while commanding the regiment which advanced the farthest into enemy lines during Pickett's Charge at the Battle of Gettysburg.
- James B. Gordon (1822–1864), a general of cavalry in the Confederate Army during the American Civil War.
- Deneen Graham (born 1964), the first black woman to be crowned Miss North Carolina (1983).
- Gladys Gunzer (1939-2016) noted American medalist and sculptor
- Richard N. Hackett (1866-1923) Congressional Representative from 1907 to 1909
- Jim Hamby (1897-1991), former MLB player
- Roger Hamby (born 1943), Former NASCAR driver and former team owner
- Johnson Jay Hayes, (1886-1970) U.S. federal judge
- Junior Johnson (1931–2019), in the 1950s, Johnson became a legend in the rural South by consistently outrunning law-enforcement officials in auto chases while delivering homemade liquor (moonshine) to his customers. Johnson then became a champion NASCAR racer, winning 50 NASCAR races before his retirement and also winning 6 Winston Cup championships as a car owner.
- Sallie Chapman Gordon Law (1805–1894), first recorded Confederate nurse in the Civil War.
- William Ballard Lenoir (1751–1839), the first President of the University of North Carolina at Chapel Hill.
- Clinton Miller, (1939-), Born in Ferguson, then moved to Virginia and became a successful politician. He served in the Virginia House of Delegates
- Jimmy Pardue (1930-1964) former NASCAR driver
- Benny Parsons (1941–2007), NASCAR racer who won the 1973 NASCAR championship. After his retirement, he became a TV racing analyst.
- Harry Pearson (1937-2014) journalist, audio reviewer, and publisher who founded The Absolute Sound magazine
- James Larkin Pearson (1879–1981), poet and newspaper publisher who served as North Carolina Poet Laureate from 1953 to 1981.
- Shirley Randleman (1950) NC State Representative and Senator, Also County commissioner.
- Waylon Reavis (born 1978), musician, lead vocalist of Cleveland, Ohio metal band Mushroomhead.
- Shirrel Rhoades (born 1942), writer, publisher, professor, filmmaker, and the former executive vice president of Marvel Entertainment.
- Eddie Settle, member of the North Carolina Senate
- Morgan Shepherd (born 1941), NASCAR driver for over fifty years; oldest driver to lead at least one lap in a NASCAR race. He currently owns his own team in the NASCAR Xfinity Series as the Shepherd Racing Ventures team
- Montford Stokes (1762–1842), United States Senator, Governor of North Carolina (1816–1832), appointed by President Andrew Jackson to lead the Federal Indian Commission in what is now Oklahoma; he is believed to be the only veteran of the Revolutionary War buried in that state.
- John Swofford (born 1948), Commissioner of the Atlantic Coast Conference (ACC) from 1997 to 2021; coordinator of the Bowl Championship Series (BCS) in college football.
- William Oliver Swofford (1945–2000), pop singer in the 1960s and 1970s (under the name Oliver), known for his hits Good Morning Starshine (featured in the Broadway musical Hair) and Jean, the theme song of the Oscar-winning film The Prime of Miss Jean Brodie.
- Irene Triplett (1930-2020), who was the last recipient of an American Civil War pension
- Tracy Walker (1939-2019), NC politician
- Otto Wood (1894-1930), Bandit and desperado.

=== Tom Dooley ===
Wilkes County native Tom Dula (Dooley), a Confederate veteran of the American Civil War who was tried and hanged shortly after the war for the murder of his fiancée, Laura Foster. To this day many people believe that one of Dula's jealous ex-girlfriends murdered Laura Foster, that Dula was innocent of the crime, and that he accepted blame only to protect his former lover.

The case was given nationwide publicity by newspapers such as The New York Times and the New York Herald, and thus became a folk legend in the rural South. Dula's legend was popularized in 1958 by the top-selling Kingston Trio song "Hang Down Your Head, Tom Dooley." Dula's story was also turned into a 1959 movie starring Michael Landon as Dula, and each summer Bleu Moon Productions presents an outdoor drama based on the story.

In 2001, Tom Dula was ceremonially acquitted of all charges by the county.

== See also ==
- List of counties in North Carolina
- National Register of Historic Places listings in Wilkes County, North Carolina
- Swan Creek AVA, wine region partially located in the county
- Yadkin Valley AVA, wine region partially located in the county

== Works cited ==
- Corbitt, David Leroy (2000). The formation of the North Carolina counties, 1663-1943 (reprint ed.). Raleigh: North Carolina Division of Archives and History. OCLC 46398241.
- Hayes, Johnson J. (1962). The Land of Wilkes. Wilkesboro: Wilkes County Historical Society. OCLC 3586318.
