= Creston =

Creston may refer to:

== Places ==
=== Canada ===
- Creston, British Columbia, a town in the Regional District of Central Kootenay
  - Creston (electoral district), a former provincial electoral district
- Creston Formation, a formation cropping out in Newfoundland
  - Creston, Newfoundland and Labrador a town in Burin peninsula

=== United States ===
- Creston, California, a census-designated place
- Creston, Illinois, a village
- Creston, Indiana, a census-designated place
- Creston, Iowa, a city
  - Creston station
- Creston, Kentucky, an unincorporated community
- Creston, Louisiana, an unincorporated community
- Creston, Nebraska, a village
- Creston, New Jersey, an unincorporated community within Hamilton Township
- Creston, North Carolina, an unincorporated community
- Creston, Ohio, a village
- Creston, Oregon, a neighborhood of Portland, Oregon
- Creston, South Dakota, an unincorporated community
- Creston, Washington, a town
- Creston, West Virginia, an unincorporated community
- Creston Township (disambiguation)
- Creston Subdivision, a railroad line owned by CSX Transportation in the U.S. State of South Carolina

=== Elsewhere ===
- Creston (Macedonia), a town in ancient Macedonia, Greece

== People ==
- Paul Creston (1906–1985), American composer of classical music
- René-Yves Creston (1898–1964), Breton artist, ethnologist and French Resistance activist during World War II

== Other uses ==
- Creston (apple), an apple cultivar
- Creston Electric Instruments, a producer of electric guitars and basses

== See also ==
- Crestone (disambiguation)
- Creston High School (disambiguation)
