= Chestnut Hills =

Chestnut Hills may refer to:

- Chestnut Hills (Massachusetts)
- Chestnut Hill, Massachusetts
- Chestnut Hill, Belchertown, Massachusetts
- Chestnut Hill, Blackstone, Massachusetts
- Chestnut Hill, Ashe County, North Carolina
- Chestnut Hill, Henderson County, North Carolina
- Chestnut Hill Township, Ashe County, North Carolina
