= Helton =

Helton may refer to:

- Helton, Cumbria, a village in England
- Helton, Kentucky, United States
- Helton, Missouri, United States
- Helton Township, Ashe County, North Carolina, USA
  - Helton, North Carolina, an unincorporated community in Helton Township
- Helton (name), an English surname from the village of Elton, Cheshire, England.
- Heltonville, Indiana, United States

== See also ==
- Helton Creek Falls
