= Chestnut Hill, North Carolina =

Chestnut Hill, North Carolina may refer to:

- Chestnut Hill, Ashe County, North Carolina
- Chestnut Hill, Henderson County, North Carolina
- Chestnut Hill Township, Ashe County, North Carolina
