= Clifton Township, Ashe County, North Carolina =

Township in Ashe County, North Carolina, U.S.

Coordinates: 36.4632659°N 81.5815776°W

Clifton Township
- Township
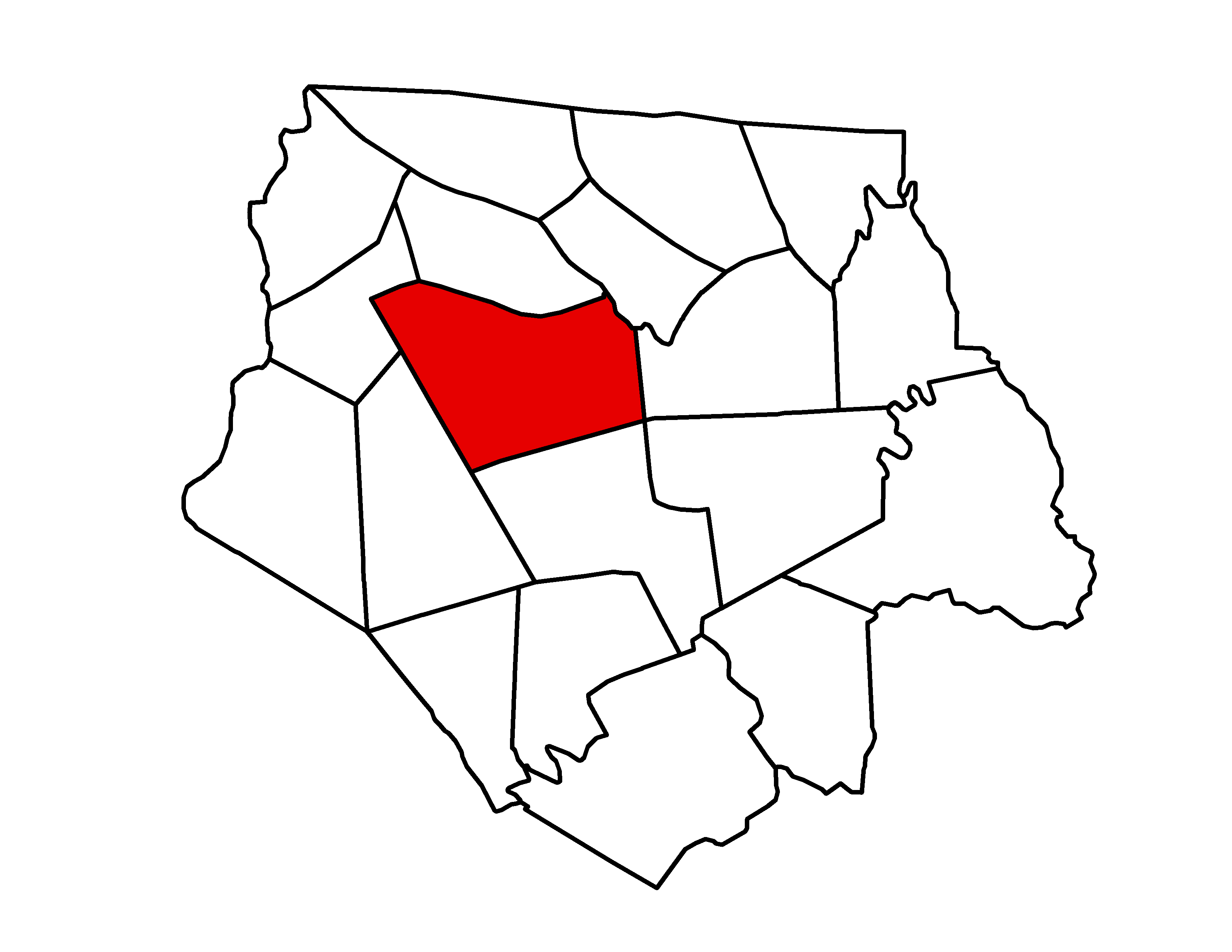
- Location of Clifton Township within Ashe County

- Location of Ashe County within North Carolina
- Country: United States
- State: North Carolina
- County: Ashe

Area
  - Land: 29.6 sq mi (77 km^{2})

Population (2020)
  - Total: 1,741
- Time zone: UTC-5 (EST)
  - Summer (DST): UTC-4 (EDT)
- Area codes: 336, 743

Clifton Township is a township in Ashe County, North Carolina, United States.

== Geography ==
Clifton Township is one of 19 townships in Ashe County. It occupies 29.6 square miles (76.7 km^{2}) in north-central Ashe County. There are no incorporated municipalities located within Clifton Township. Unincorporated communities include Clifton, Comet, Fig, and Warrensville.

== Population ==
In 2020, the population of Clifton Township was 1,741.
