= Jefferson Township, North Carolina =

Jefferson Township is the name of two townships in the U.S. state of North Carolina:

- Jefferson Township, Ashe County, North Carolina
- Jefferson Township, Guilford County, North Carolina

== See also ==
- Jefferson Township (disambiguation)
