= Jerd Branch (North Carolina) =

Stream in Ashe County, North Carolina, U.S.

- Location within the U.S. state of North Carolina

Location
- Country: United States
- State: North Carolina
- County: Ashe

Physical characteristics
- Mouth: Helton Creek
  - coordinates: 36.55°N 81.49°W

Jerd Branch is a stream located in Ashe County, North Carolina, United States.

== Course ==
Jerd Branch rises about 1 mile (1.6 km) west of Sturgills in Ashe County. Jerd Branch then takes an easterly course towards Helton and joins Helton Creek, near the intersection of Helton Creek Road and NC 194.
