= List of killings by law enforcement officers in the United States, January 2020 =

This is a list of people reported killed by non-military law enforcement officers in the United States in January 2020, whether in the line of duty or not, and regardless of reason or method. The listing documents the occurrence of a death, making no implications regarding wrongdoing or justification on the part of the person killed or officer involved. Killings are arranged by date of the incident that caused death. Different death dates, if known, are noted in the description. The table below lists 99 people.

== January 2020 ==
Date	Name (age) of deceased	Race	State (city)	Description
2020-01-30	Keith Dutree Collins (52)	Black	North Carolina (Raleigh)	Collins was shot and killed by police.
2020-01-30	Richard Davis (29)	Unknown	Missouri (Kansas City)	Davis was shot and killed by police.
2020-01-30	Chad E. Nicolia (41)	White	Ohio (Hockingport)	Nicolia was shot and killed by police.
2020-01-30	Abdirahman Salad (15)	Black	Ohio (Columbus)	Salad was shot and killed by police.
2020-01-29	Justin Leman (32)	White	Alaska (Kasilof)	Leman was shot and killed by police.
2020-01-29	Jaquyn Oneill Light (20)	Black	North Carolina (Graham)	Light was shot and killed by police.
2020-01-29	Clint Stevens (34)	White	New York (Deposit)	Stevens was shot and killed by police.
2020-01-28	Jonathan Bentley (37)		Kentucky (Pike County)	Bentley was shot and killed by police.
2020-01-28	Robert Cocio (39)	Hispanic	Arizona (Tuscson)	Cocio was shot and killed by police.
2020-01-28	Joshua Greenleaf (27)	White	Arizona (Scottsdale)	Greenleaf was shot and killed by police.
2020-01-28	Eric Lurry (37)	Black	Illinois (Joliet)	
2020-01-27	Aaron T. Booker (22)	Black	South Carolina (Aiken)	
2020-01-27	William Howard Green (43)	Black	Maryland (Temple Hills)	Green was shot and killed by police while he was handcuffed and sitting against the police cruiser.
2020-01-27	Kevin Alan Smallman (32)	White	Arizona (Chandler)	Smallman was shot and killed by police.
2020-01-27	John Francis Tippett Jr. (43)	White	Maryland (Lexington Park)	Tippett was shot and killed by police.
2020-01-25	Joshua James Brown (34)	Black	Ohio (Columbus)	Brown was shot and killed by police.
2020-01-25	D'ovion Semaj Perkins (19)	Black	Colorado (Aurora)	Perkins was shot and killed by police.
2020-01-24	Rebecca Angel Alexander (35)	White	Alabama (Mobile)	Alexander was shot and killed by police.
2020-01-24	Toby Diller (31)	Hispanic	California (Oak Park)	Diller was shot and killed by police.
2020-01-24	Scott Joseph Weber Jr. (27)	White	Texas (San Angelo)	Weber was shot and killed by police.
2020-01-23	Marquis Golden (29)	Black	Florida (St. Petersburg)	Golden was shot and killed by police.
2020-01-23	James Lewis Mathis III (30)	White	Texas (Paris)	Mathis was shot and killed by police.
2020-01-23	Michael J. Rivera (32)	Black	New Jersey (Bloomingdale)	Rivera was shot and killed by police.
2020-01-23	Deandre Lee Seaborough-Patterson (22)	Black	Georgia (Savannah)	Seaborough-Patterson was shot and killed by police.
2020-01-23	Andrew Smyrna (32)	Black	Georgia (Atlanta)	Smyra was driving an allegedly stolen car when he hit a patrol car. An officer shot him and he drove away but later crashed. His cause of death was gunshot wounds.
2020-01-23	Gage Southard (26)	White	Alaska (Wasilla)	Southard was shot and killed by police.
2020-01-22	Jon Phillip Bryant (40)	White	Colorado (Arvada)	Bryant was shot and killed by police.
2020-01-22	Armando Moreno Garcia (37)	Hispanic	Arizona (Mesa)	Garcia was shot and killed by police.
2020-01-22	Adam Ray Hernandez (34)	Hispanic	Oklahoma (Moore)	Hernandez was shot and killed by police.
2020-01-22	Jon Phillip Bryant (40)	White	Colorado (Arvada)	
2020-01-21	Gamel Antonio Brown (30)	Black	Maryland (Owings Mills)	
2020-01-21	Rory Behling (32)	White	Wisconsin (Fox Crossing)	Behling was shot and killed by police.
2020-01-21	Reginald Leon Boston (20)	Black	Florida (Jacksonville)	Boston was shot and killed by police.
2020-01-21	Anthony Langley (24)	White	Arkansas (Atkins)	Langley was shot and killed by police.
2020-01-21	Sok Chin Son (60)	Asian	Washington (Lacey)	Son was shot and killed by police.
2020-01-21	Darius J. Tarver (23)	Black	Texas (Denton)	Tarver was shot and killed by police.
2020-01-20	Dustin Furr (39)	White	Indiana (Lafayette)	Furr was shot and killed by police.
2020-01-20	Edward Gendron (57)	White	Connecticut (Waterbury)	Gendron was shot and killed by police.
2020-01-20	Jonathan David Messare (41)	White	Arizona (Sedona)	Messare was shot and killed by police.
2020-01-20	Miguel Mercado Segura (31)	Hispanic	California (Fountain Valley)	Segura was shot and killed by police.
2020-01-19	Dustin Alexander Nealis (43)	White	Florida (Sebring)	Nealis was shot and killed by police who were responding to a possible domestic dispute. Nealis allegedly opened fire first; no officers were injured.
2020-01-19	Eric Parsa (16)	White	Louisiana (Metairie)	Police responded to a business for a report of a man attacking another man, and located the victim in the parking lot "suffering from multiple bite wounds, including some to his face, and abrasions". Police arrested the victim's 16-year-old son, Eric Parsa, who "remained violent while deputies attempted to arrest him". According to a police statement, "once deputies arrived, they tried to control the violent teenager's outbursts to prevent him from again attacking his parents and first responders". Parsa was severely autistic and "suffered an apparent medical emergency during the arrest and became unresponsive". An autopsy determined Parsa's death was accidental, with morbid obesity, an enlarged heart, and being restrained in the prone position as contributing factors.
2020-01-19	Kelvin White (42)	Black	Virginia (Chesapeake)	
2020-01-19	Dustin Alexander Nealis (43)	White	Florida (Sebring)	
2020-01-19	Charles Schauer (33)	White	Illinois (Plainfield)	
2020-01-17	Samuel David Mallard (19)	Black	Georgia (Powder Springs)	Mallard was shot and killed by police.
2020-01-17	Thomas Valva (8)	White	New York (Center Moriches)	NYPD Officer Michael Valva and his fiancée forced his eight-year-old son Thomas and his ten-year-old brother to sleep in their garage, leading to Thomas's death by hypothermia. Valva was convicted of second-degree murder.
2020-01-16	Owen Earl Barton (66)	White	Nevada (Yerington)	Barton was shot and killed by police while holding a gun. Later in the year, Barton's son was non-fatally shot by police in Salt Lake City.
2020-01-16	Jack D. Bolinger (35)	White	Wisconsin (Wausau)	Bolinger was shot and killed by police.
2020-01-16	Murbarak Soulemane (19)	Black	Connecticut (West Haven)	Soulemane was shot and killed by police.
2020-01-15	Albert Lee Hughes (47)	Blck	Georgia (Lawrenceville)	Hughes was shot and killed by police.
2020-01-15	Landwell Vance McCall (50)	White	North Carolina (Fleetwood)	McCall was shot and killed by police.
2020-01-15	Aaron Phillips (31)	White	Florida (Mulberry)	Phillips was shot and killed by police.
2020-01-14	Frank Cogar (35)	White	Montana (Missoula)	Cogar was shot and killed by police.
2020-01-14	Renard Antonio Daniels (55)	Black	Florida (Cocoa)	Daniels was shot and killed by police.
2020-01-14	Eliezer Perez (51)	Hispanic	Florida (The Villages)	Perez was shot and killed by police.
2020-01-13	Randy Glen Goodale (45)	White	Texas (San Antonio)	Goodale had a federal felony warrant for felon in possession of a handgun, and US Marshall and SAPD officers in marked and unmarked vehicles surrounded Goodale for an arrest while he was in his pickup truck on his driveway. Officers shot and fatally wounded Goodale, which caused him to collide his truck into an unoccupied police van. SAPD police chief William McManus reported that Goodale was shot attempting to ram his way past an occupied police vehicle to evade his arrest warrant, and refused to recant after security footage from Goodale's residence was released that contradicted their narrative. In 2022, Goodale's widow and their daughter sued the city and two officers involved for his wrongful death.
2020-01-13	Keenan McCain (29)	Black	Indiana (Gary)	McCain was shot and killed by police.
2020-01-12	Thomas Charles Snyder (52)	White	Colorado (Lakewood)	Snyder was shot and killed by police.
2020-01-12	Brad Stirewalt (47)	White	Missouri (Carthage)	Stirewalt was shot and killed by police.
2020-01-12	Victor Valencia (31)	Hispanic	California (Los Angeles)	Valencia was shot and killed by police.
2020-01-11	Henry Isaac Jones (47)	Black	Georgia (Bainbridge)	Jones was shot and killed by police.
2020-01-11	Eric Reynolds (43)	White	Colorado (Glenwood Springs)	Reynolds was shot and killed by police.
2020-01-11	Ryan O. Simms (49)	Black	Florida (Miami Beach)	Simms was shot and killed by police.
2020-01-10	Clando Anitok (25)	Native Hawaiian or Pacific Islander	Washington (Spokane)	Anitok was shot and killed by a deputy after a chase that ended in a crash. The deputy shot Anitok after he allegedly reached into his pocket. Anitok did not have a weapon.
2020-01-10	Juan Ayon-Ruiz (24)	Hispanic	California (Muscoy)	Ayon-Ruiz was shot and killed by police.
2020-01-09	Cody Carnes (30)	White	North Dakota (Bismarck)	Carnes was shot and killed by police. It was determined Carnes did not fire at officers as authorities initially reported, though he did point a handgun at them.
2020-01-09	Earl Facey (37)	Black	New York (New York City)	Facey was shot and killed by police responding to the sight of Facey shooting another man. According to police statements, officers heard gunshots and saw Facey shoot another man. The officers ordered Facey to get onto the ground; when Facey refused, the officers shot him. Facey and the man he shot were both taken to the hospital, where both were pronounced dead.
2020-01-09	Claude Fain (47)	Black	Pennsylvania (Philadelphia)	Fain was shot and killed by police. Authorities said the officers spotted Fain on the block, and he ran into his house, telling them, “I’m going to kill all three of you (expletive).” He slammed the door and began firing at the officers.
2020-01-09	Bernie Wade Johnson (34)	White	Alabama (Semmes)	Johnson was shot and killed by police. His Grandmother believed his paranoid schizophrenia may have led him to attempt suicide by cop.
2020-01-09	Joshua Franklin Roberts (41)	Unknown	Ohio (Powhatan Point)	Roberts was shot and killed by police.
2020-01-08	Madison Adams (27)	Unknown	California (Nipton)	Adams was shot and killed by police pursuing Adams for the alleged murder of his mother. According to police statements, officers located Adams and conducted a "high-risk" traffic stop on a freeway; during the traffic stop officers shot at Adams. Police say Adams appeared to have shot himself and was declared dead at the scene.
2020-01-08	Dustin M. Eaton (35)	White	Missouri (Bismarck)	Eaton was shot and killed by police responding to reports of a domestic assault. According to police statements, officers arrived at the scene, Eaton pointed a gun at an officer, and the officer shot him in response. Eaton died at the scene.
2020-01-08	Donald Ashcraft (51)	Unknown race	Texas (Dallas)	
2020-01-07	Daniel Duane Jensen (59)	White	Alaska (North Pole)	Jensen was shot and killed by police attempting to arrest him. According to police statements, officers searched door-to-door for Jensen, and found Jensen with another individual in a structure. Jensen then allegedly grabbed a high-power rifle, which prompted officers to shoot Jensen. Jensen died at the scene.
2020-01-06	Orlando Abeyta (28)	Hispanic	New Mexico (Albuquerque)	Abeyta was shot and killed by police responding to reports that Abeyta was threatening people with a gun. According to police statements, officers confronted Abeyta at a bus stop and ordered Abeyta to drop what appeared to be a handgun. Abeyta refused to drop his gun and pointed the gun at the officers instead, at which point the officers opened fire and killed him. Abeyta's gun later turned out to be a BB gun.
2020-01-06	Troy Chase Caster (21)	White	North Carolina (Asheboro)	Caster was shot and killed by police attempting to arrest him for an armed robbery incident. According to police statements, officers spotted Caster in a vehicle and chased him. Caster allegedly fired at officers during the chase. Police forcibly ended the chase on a gravel road, and more shots were allegedly fired. Caster died at the scene.
2020-01-06	Nico Descheenie (25)	Native American	Colorado (Aurora)	Descheenie was shot and killed by police pursuing Descheenie about a stolen vehicle. According to police statements, officers followed Descheenie, until Descheenie pulled over. Descheenie then got out of the vehicle, and he allegedly engaged officers with a gun, at which point officers shot him. Descheenie was taken to a hospital and died.
2020-01-06	Dallas Pearce (33)	Native Hawaiian or Pacific Islander	Hawaii (Kailua)	Pearce was shot and killed by police pursuing Pearce, who escaped from the Laumaka Work Furlough program. According to police statements, officers found Pearce in a vehicle with what appeared to be a gun. Officers struggled with Pearce over the alleged gun in the car, and eventually shot him for safety reasons.
2020-01-06	Xavier Jaime Rovie (28)	Hispanic	Arizona (Phoenix)	Rovie was shot and killed by police attempting to stop him from riding his bike. According to police statements, officers tried to stop Rovie from riding his bike because of multiple traffic offences; Rovie rode away on his bike. An officer got out of a patrol vehicle to run after Rovie to arrest him, Rovie resisted physically, and a physical fight started. Rovie then allegedly fired his gun at the officers, which prompted the officers to shoot Rovie. Rovie was taken to a hospital where he died.
2020-01-05	George Dison (57)	White	Alabama (Elkmont)	Dison was shot and killed by police responding to reports of domestic violence. According to police statements, when officers arrived at the scene, Dison walked out of the woods with a shotgun. Officers commanded Dison to drop his weapon, Dison refused and allegedly pointed the shotgun at the officers, at which point the officers shot and killed him.
2020-01-05	Kwamae Jones (17)	Black	Florida (Jacksonville)	Jones was shot and killed by police attempting to conduct a traffic stop. According to police statements, officers attempted to stop a vehicle travelling in the wrong direction; the vehicle would not stop, and eventually crashed into the base of a pedestrian bridge. An officer approached the crash car, and shot Jones for some reason.
2020-01-05	Samuel Lanham (50)	White	Oklahoma (Oklahoma City)	Lanham was shot and killed by police responding to a separate domestic assault call. According to police statements, officers encountered Lanham carrying a large knife, and ordered him to drop his weapon. After Lanham refused to drop his weapon, officers shot non-lethal bean-bag shotgun rounds and stun gun rounds, which were ineffective. Lanham then allegedly advanced towards one of the officers, at which point the officers shot Lanham. Lanham was transported to a local hospital where he died.
2020-01-05	Miciah Lee (18)	Black	Nevada (Sparks)	Lee was shot and killed by police responding to a call of an allegedly suicidal person. According to police statements, when officers arrived Lee drove away from the scene and crashed his vehicle. Lee then allegedly reached towards a weapon, at which point officers shot and killed him.
2020-01-05	Brandon D. Roberts (27)	Black	Delaware (Milford)	Roberts was shot and killed by police responding to reports of a domestic incident involving weapons. According to police statements, Roberts advanced towards officers when they arrived at the scene while brandishing a large knife, at which point officers shot Roberts. Roberts was taken to a local hospital where he died.
2020-01-05	Drew Nichols Wallas-Flores (30)	Hispanic	Texas (Lubbock)	Wallas-Flores was shot and killed by police responding to reports of a break-in. According to police statements, Wallas-Flores ran from officers as they arrived on the scene. When officers caught up to Wallas-Flores on an intersection, he allegedly fired a handgun at one of the officers, at which point officers returned fire and struck him. Wallas-Flores died at the scene.
2020-01-05	George Dison (57)	White	Alabama (Elkmont)	
2020-01-04	Tina Marie Davis (53)	Black	New York (Spring Valley)	
2020-01-02	Michael Gregory (30)	Hispanic	Connecticut (Ansonia)	Gregory was shot and killed by police responding to reports of a domestic incident. According to police statements, when officers confronted Gregory, he was violating a protective order and armed with a knife. Gregory allegedly lunged at an officer with a knife, at which point police shot and killed him. The Connecticut State Police - Western District Major Crime Squad unit and Danbury State's Attorney's Office are investigating the shooting.
2020-01-02	Stanley Hayes (69)	Unknown	Oregon (Hillsboro)	Hayes was shot and killed by police responding to reports of an armed man. According to police statements, after officers arrived at the scene, Hayes started shooting into the street from a condo for half an hour. Hayes eventually came out of his condo, and police shot him. Hayes was taken to a hospital and died there.
2020-01-02	Jeffery Dale Millsap (26)	White	Missouri (Holt County)	Millsap was shot and killed by police responding to reports that Millsap had stolen a gun at knifepoint and shot somebody. According to police statements, officers pursued Millsap to a house and shot him for some reason. The Missouri Highway Patrol is investigating the shooting.
2020-01-02	Troy Matthew Sullenger (41)	White	California (Murrieta)	Sullenger was shot and killed by police pursuing him about reports of a man waving a gun during an argument. According to police statements, at the end of the chase Sullenger allegedly fired at officers, who returned fire and killed Sullenger.
2020-01-02	Jamari Daiwon Tarver (26)	Black	Nevada (North Las Vegas)	Tarver was shot and killed by police stopping him to investigate about a stolen vehicle. According to police statements, officers pursued Tarver in a suspected stolen Toyota to a parking lot, where Tarver allegedly started rammed at least two cars, including the police cruiser. Officers opened fire while Tarver was ramming their police cruiser. Tarver died at the scene.
2020-01-02	Tyree Davis (26)	Black	Illinois (Chicago)	Davis was shot and killed by police responding to reports that Davis was robbing people with a knife. According to police statements, officers arrived on the scene and found Davis had a knife. Davis refused police orders to drop the knife, and allegedly began to approach the officers. The officers fired a stun gun a couple of times, to no effect, and when Davis continued to approach the officers they shot him three times. Davis was taken to a hospital where he died.
2020-01-02	Mariano Ocon Jr. (31)	Hispanic	Illinois (Chicago)	Ocon was shot and killed by both police and himself. According to police statements, during a traffic stop, Ocon fled his vehicle on foot with a firearm. After officers caught up to him, officers ordered Ocon to drop his weapon, and shot him when he refused. Medical examiners later stated that Ocon had also shot himself, and that both shots from himself and from police were independently sufficient to kill him. The Civilian Office of Police Accountability is investigating the shooting.
2020-01-01	Gerardo Antonio Conchas-Bustas (20)	Hispanic	Colorado (Denver)	Conchas-Bustas was shot and killed by police responding to a domestic incident. According to police statements, officers were searching through the scene when Conchas-Bustas lunged at the officer with a 10-inch knife. Officers dodged the knife and shot Conchas-Bustas, who died at the scene.
2020-01-01	Derrick Elseth Jr. (24)	White	Virginia (Richmond County)	Elseth was shot and killed by police serving an arrest warrant for Elseth. According to police statements, police confronted Elseth, who was allegedly armed with a handgun, and shot him during their encounter. Elseth died at the scene.
2020-01-01	Gabriel Strickland (25)	White	California (Grass Valley)	Strickland was shot and killed by police responding to reports of a man walking down the street with a shotgun. According to police statements, officers confronted Strickland, who told police that his gun is an airsoft gun and refused to disarm. Officers tried to disarm Strickland with two Taser shots, both of which missed. Strickland allegedly responded by pointing his gun at officers, at which point police shot Strickland. Strickland was transported to a hospital, where he was pronounced dead. His gun was later confirmed to be an airsoft gun.
2020-01-01	Teddy James Maverick Varner (29)	White	Oregon (Central Point)	Varner was shot and killed by police responding to reports of an assault with a weapon and "shots fired". According to police statements, police arrived at the scene and tried to convince Varner to come out. Varner allegedly came out with a gun pointed at an officer, at which point another officer shot him. Varner died en route to an area hospital.

== See also ==
- Death in custody § United States
- Henry A. Wallace Police Crime Public Database
- List of cases of police brutality
- List of countries with annual rates and counts for killings by law enforcement officers
- List of law enforcement officers killed in the line of duty in the United States
- List of law enforcement officers convicted for an on-duty killing in the United States
- List of shootings by US immigration agents
- List of police reforms related to the George Floyd protests
- List of unarmed African Americans killed by law enforcement officers in the United States
- Lists of killings by law enforcement officers
- Police brutality in the United States
- Police misconduct § United States
- Police riot § United States
- Police use of deadly force in the United States
