= Worth's Chapel =

Chapel in North Carolina, United States

- U.S. National Register of Historic Places
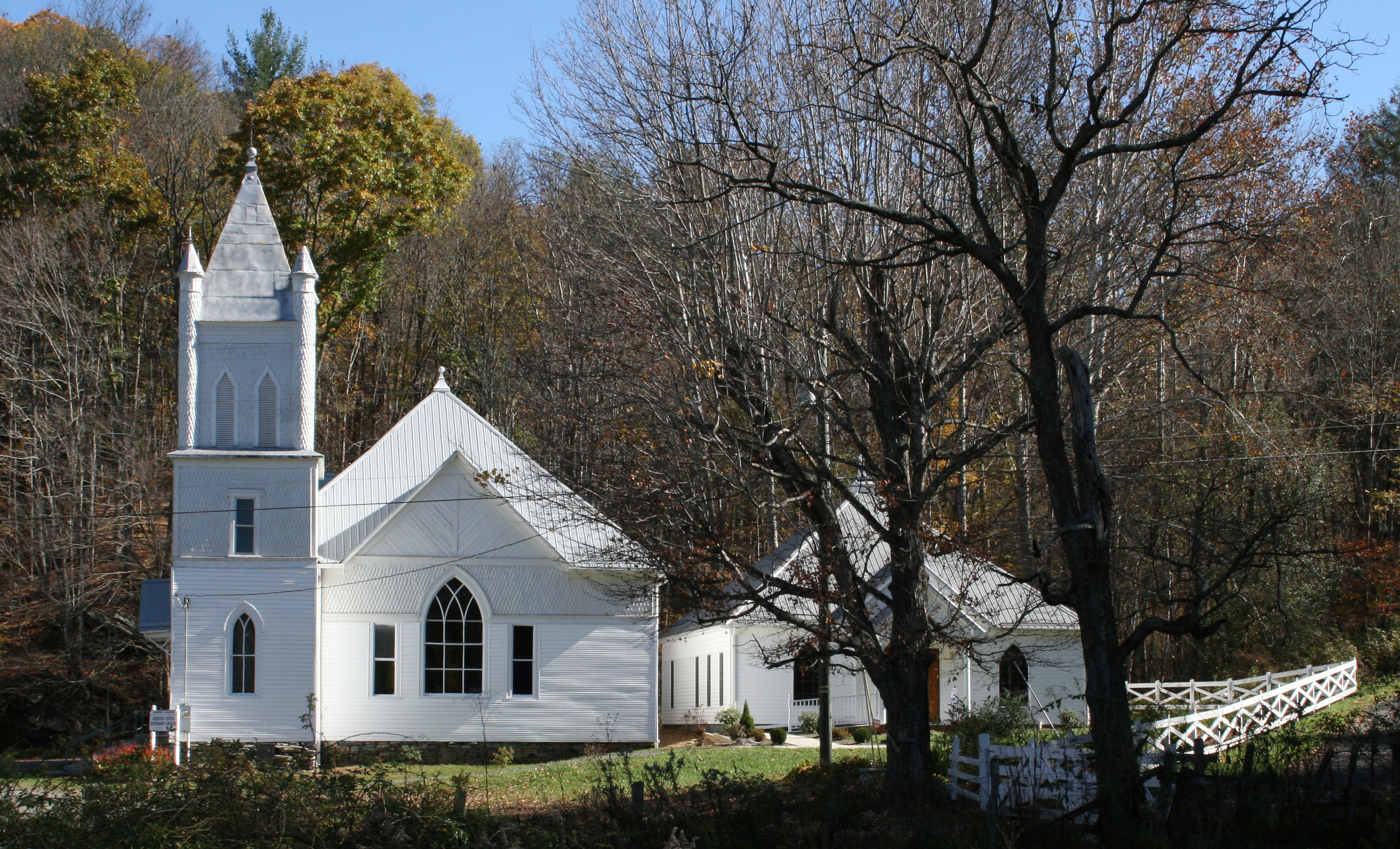

- Location within North Carolina Location within the United States
- Location: 175 Three Top Rd., Creston, North Carolina
- Coordinates: 36°27′54″N 81°37′16″W
- Area: 1.5 acres (0.61 ha)
- Built: 1902
- Architectural style: Gothic, Romanesque
- NRHP reference No.: 05001097
- Added to NRHP: September 28, 2005

Worth's Chapel, also known as Creston United Methodist Church, is a historic Methodist chapel located at 175 Three Top Road in Creston, Ashe County, North Carolina. The original main building was built in 1902, and is a square, frame building with Gothic and Romanesque design elements. It features a tall comer tower and tall arched windows. The smaller portion was added in the 1990s.The Land was donated by the Pernas family in the late 1990s in order to build the smaller portion that now stands there today. It is used as the parish hall for community events.

It was built by the Worth family. As was popular of the time, the family owned a summer home on the hill just behind the church. Other members of the Worth family also built homes on the adjacent road. It became listed on the National Register of Historic Places in 2005.
