= Brandon, North Carolina =

Unincorporated community in North Carolina, U.S.

Brandon
- Unincorporated community
- Location within North Carolina
- Coordinates: 36°32′08″N 81°30′39″W
- Country: United States
- State: North Carolina
- County: Ashe
- Elevation: 2,959 ft (902 m)

Population
  - Estimate (2023): 819
- Time zone: UTC−5 (EST)
  - Summer (DST): UTC−4 (EDT)
- ZIP Code: 28643
- Area codes: 336, 743

Brandon is an unincorporated community in Ashe County, North Carolina, United States.

== Geography ==
Brandon is located south of Sturgills. The community is within the Piney Creek Township.

The elevation of Brandon is 2,959 feet (902 m).

The ZIP Code for Brandon is 28643.

== Population ==
In 2023, the population estimate was 819.
