= Crestone =

Crestone may refer to:

- Crestone (Macedonia), a town of ancient Macedonia, Greece
- Crestone, Colorado, a town in Saguache County
- Crestone Needle, a mountain peak in Colorado
- Crestone Peak, the seventh highest peak in Colorado
- The Crestones, four peaks in Colorado
- Crestone (album), a 2007 album by the Paul Winter Consort

== See also ==
- Creston (disambiguation)
