= Grassy Creek Township, Ashe County, North Carolina =

Township in Ashe County, North Carolina, U.S.

Coordinates: 36.5465165°N 81.3949264°W

Grassy Creek Township
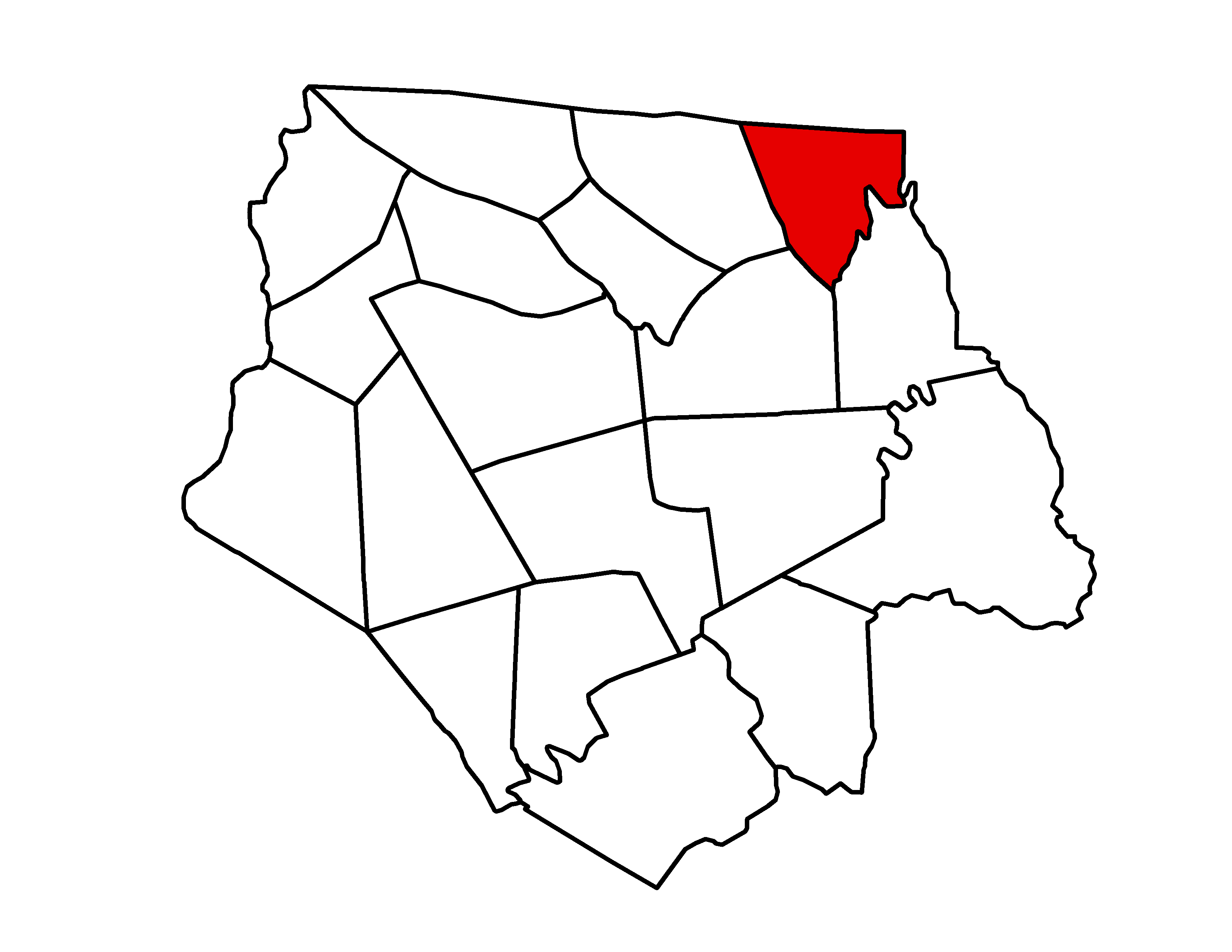
- Location of Grassy Creek Township within Ashe County

- Location of Ashe County within North Carolina
- Country: United States
- State: North Carolina
- County: Ashe

Area
  - Total: 15.1 sq mi (39 km^{2})
- Time zone: UTC-5 (EST)
  - Summer (DST): UTC-4 (EDT)
- Area codes: 336, 743

Grassy Creek Township is a township in Ashe County, North Carolina, United States.

== Geography and population ==
Grassy Creek Township is one of 19 townships in Ashe County. It is 15.1 square miles (39.0 km^{2}) in total area, and is located in northeastern Ashe County.

In 2020, the population of the township was 505.

Grassy Creek Township is bordered to the north by Virginia, to the east by Alleghany County, to the southeast by Chestnut Hill Township, to the southwest by Walnut Hill Township, and to the west by Helton Township.

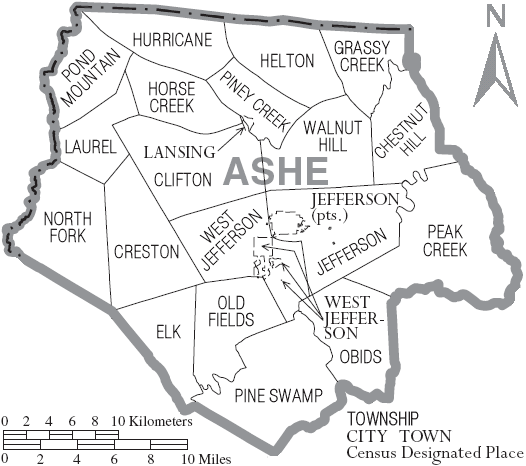
Map of Ashe County with municipal and township labels
