= Baptist Chapel Church and Cemetery =

Historic cemetery in Ashe County, North Carolina, US

- U.S. National Register of Historic Places
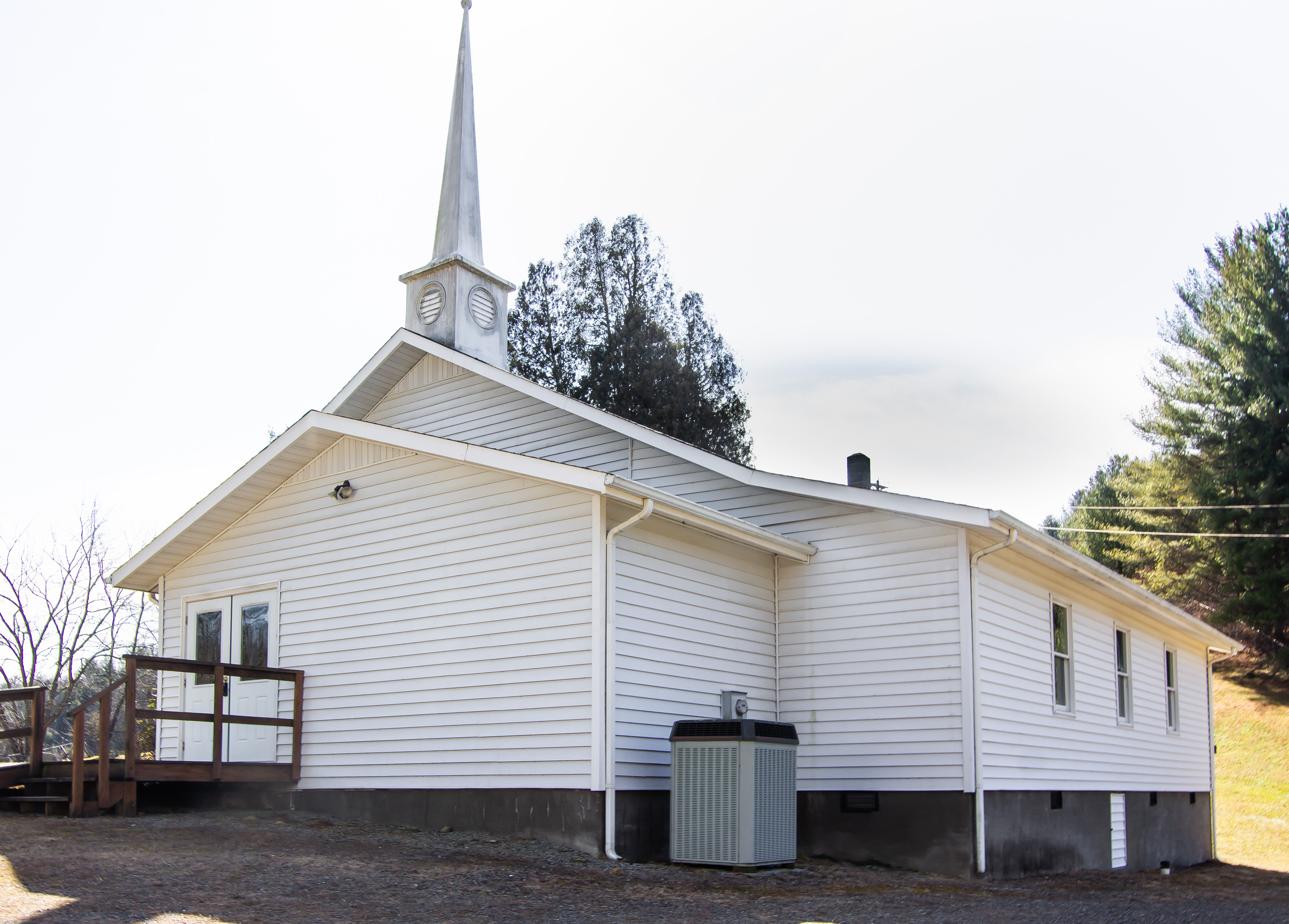

- Location within North Carolina Location within the United States
- Location: E of Helton on SR 1527, near Helton, North Carolina
- Coordinates: 36°32′51″N 81°26′42″W
- Area: 3 acres (1.2 ha)
- Built: 1872
- NRHP reference No.: 76001302
- Added to NRHP: November 13, 1976

Baptist Chapel Church and Cemetery is a historic Baptist church and cemetery located near Helton, Ashe County, North Carolina. It was built in 1872, and is a simple one-story frame structure, covered by weatherboards and set on a common bond brick foundation.

It was listed on the National Register of Historic Places in 1976.
