= Hurricane Township, Ashe County, North Carolina =

Township in Ashe County, North Carolina, U.S.

Hurricane Township
- Township
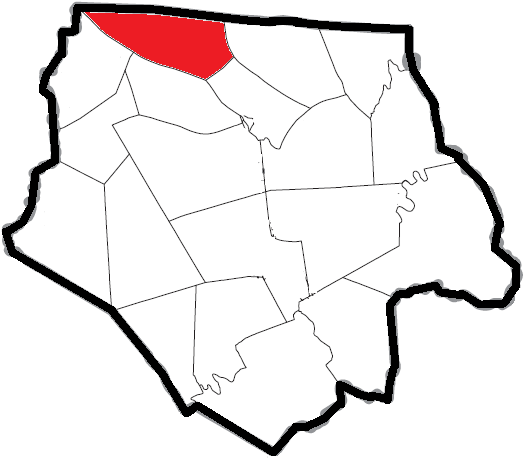
- Location of Hurricane Township within Ashe County

- Location of Ashe County within North Carolina
- Country: United States
- State: North Carolina
- County: Ashe

Area
  - Land: 13.9 sq mi (36 km^{2})

Population (2020)
  - Total: 269
- Time zone: UTC-5 (EST)
  - Summer (DST): UTC-4 (EDT)
- ZIP Code: 28643
- Area codes: 336, 743

Hurricane Township is a township in Ashe County, North Carolina, United States.

In 2024, Hurricane Township experienced severe flooding after the remnants of Hurricane Helene passed through western North Carolina. Many homes and businesses were damaged or destroyed.

== Geography ==
Hurricane Township is one of 19 townships within Ashe County. It has a land area of 13.9 square miles (36 km^{2}). The township is located in northwestern Ashe County.

Communities within Hurricane Township include Husk and Nella.

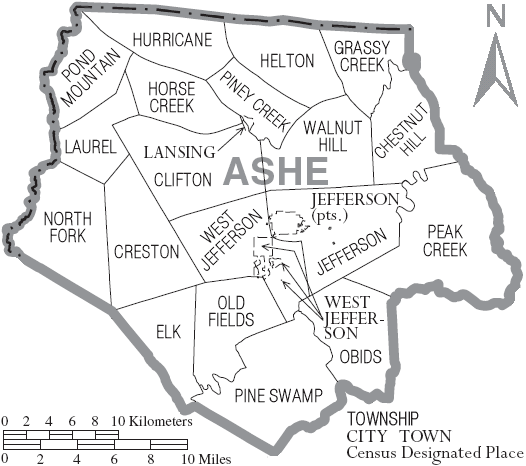
Map of Ashe County with municipal and township labels

== Population ==
In 2020, the population of Hurricane Township was 269.
