= Ashe County Schools =

Public school district serving Ashe County, North Carolina, United States

Address
- 320 South Street, Jefferson, North Carolina 28640; United States

District information
- Type: Public
- Grades: PK–12
- Superintendent: Eisa Cox
- Accreditations: Southern Association of Colleges and Schools
- Schools: 6
- Budget: $ 35,864,000
- NCES District ID: 3700210

Students and staff
- Students: 2,610 (2023–2024)
- Teachers: 243.93 (on FTE basis) (2010–2011)
- Staff: 267.73 (on FTE basis) (2010–2011)
- Student–teacher ratio: 13.52:1 (2010–2011)

Other information
- Website: www.asheschools.org

Ashe County Schools is a PK–12 graded school district serving Ashe County, North Carolina. The system manages seven schools, serving 2,610 students as of the 2023–2024 school year.

== History ==
While some attempts at public schools existed in the area, public education did not begin in earnest until the state of North Carolina passed the public school laws in 1839. By 1842, Ashe County adopted the state common school system and began to receive funds from the State Literary Fund to support education in the county. Around 1840, there were only two primary common schools with a total enrollment of only 48 students. Ten years later, however, enrollments had grown to 1,476 students. While 36 school districts were reported in 1853, this number grew to 93 districts with 4,371 students in 1858, a year which also saw the first county-wide tax for public schools levied.

The Civil War hit the county education establishment hard. Several years in the 1860s saw no schools operating at all in the county and the county basically had to start all over in building up the system after the war. The system went from 71 districts in which 61 districts taught school for a whole three months in 1860, to only four schools total for White students in 1870. Many of the former school buildings were in serious states of disrepair. But the end of Reconstruction brought renewed interest and by the end of the 1870s, 106 White schools and 6 Black schools existed. In 1885, the superintendent became an elected position, the first being Quincy F. Neal.

By 1917, Ashe County had seven school districts which levied their own special school taxes. In August of that year, the county board of commissioners approved an additional county-wide property tax as well as a three cent poll tax for schools.

A general move toward school consolidation began in the late 1920s under the superintendency of R. E. L. Plummer. He actually stepped down to become principal of the consolidated school in Healing Springs High School. Later, Works Progress Administration assistance furthered consolidation efforts as well as the efforts of Odie Cox, an African American teacher in the Nathan's Creek area who led the consolidation of Black schools in the county. In 1933, the system had 59 White and 7 Black one- or two-teacher schools. This was greatly reduced to the point that there were none in the county by 1960. That year, the overall number of schools had been reduced to 14 for Whites and one for Blacks.

In 2005, Ashe County Schools became one of the few districts to have internet access in all classrooms when they upgraded their system's wide area network to a fiber-optic network.

== Student demographics ==
For the 2023–2024 school year, Ashe County Schools had a total population of 2,610 students. In 2010, there were 243.93 teachers on a (FTE) basis. This produced a student-teacher ratio of 13.52:1. Also in 2010, out of the student totals, the gender ratio was 51% male to 49% female. The demographic group makeup was: White, 89%; Hispanic, 8%; Asian/Pacific Islander, 1%; Black, 0%; and American Indian, 0% (two or more races: 2%). For the same school year, 61.97% of the students received free and reduced-cost lunches.

== Governance ==
The primary governing body of Ashe County Schools follows a council–manager government format with a five-member Board of Education appointing a Superintendent to run the day-to-day operations of the system. The school system currently resides in the North Carolina State Board of Education's Seventh District.

=== Board of education ===
The five members of the Board of Education meet on the first Monday of each month. The current members of the board are: Josh Roten, Dianne Eldreth, Kim Simmons, Polly Jones, and Janet Ward.

=== Superintendent ===
Dr. Eisa Cox is the Superintendent for Ashe County Schools. She replaced Phyllis Yates at the end of the 2019–2020 school year, after Yates retired.

=== Fundraising ===
The Board of Education established an endowment fund to finance a scholarship program for teachers' classroom initiatives. The board hosts an annual endowment fund golf tournament. Over 20 teams compete generally, raising funds for the endowment.

== Member schools ==
Ashe County Schools operates seven schools, ranging from pre-kindergarten to twelfth grade. Those seven schools are separated into one early college, one high school, one middle school, three elementary schools, and one preschool.

=== Early colleges ===
- Ashe County Early College High School (West Jefferson)

=== High schools ===
- Ashe County High School (West Jefferson)

=== Middle schools ===
- Ashe County Middle School (Warrensville)

=== Elementary schools ===
- Blue Ridge Elementary School (Warrensville)
- Mountain View Elementary School (Jefferson)
- Westwood Elementary School (West Jefferson)

=== Preschools ===
- Ashe County Early Learning Center (West Jefferson)

== Awards and honors ==
Ashe County Middle School was chosen as one of only 79 schools to be a National School to Watch in 2009. They currently are still listed as a School to Watch by the National Forum to Accelerate Middle-Grades Reform. Four of the five schools in the district received "School of Distinction" recognition from the North Carolina Department of Public Instruction for both the 2010–2011 and 2011–2012 school years.

== See also ==
- List of school districts in North Carolina
