= Elk Township, Ashe County, North Carolina =

Township in Ashe County, North Carolina, U.S.

Coordinates: 36.3011927°N 81.5706109°W

Elk Township
- Township
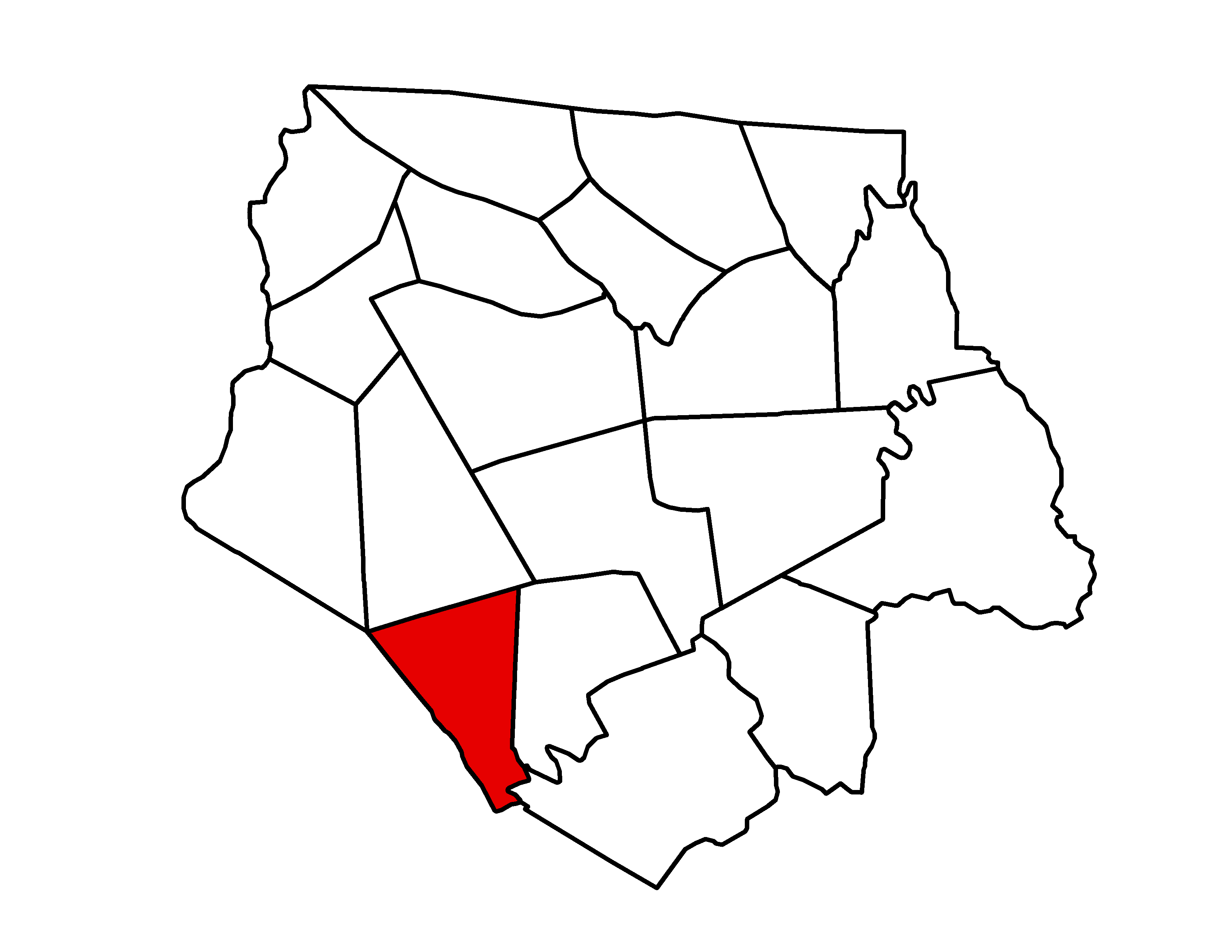
- Location of Elk Township within Ashe County

- Location of Ashe County within North Carolina
- Country: United States
- State: North Carolina
- County: Ashe

Area
  - Total: 11.7 sq mi (30 km^{2})

Population (2020)
  - Total: 586
- Time zone: UTC-5 (EST)
  - Summer (DST): UTC-4 (EDT)
- Area codes: 336, 743

Elk Township is a township in Ashe County, North Carolina, United States.

== Geography and population ==
Elk Township is one of 19 townships in Ashe County. It is 11.7 square miles (30.3 km^{2}) in total area, and is located in southwestern Ashe County.

In 2020, the population of Elk Township was 586.

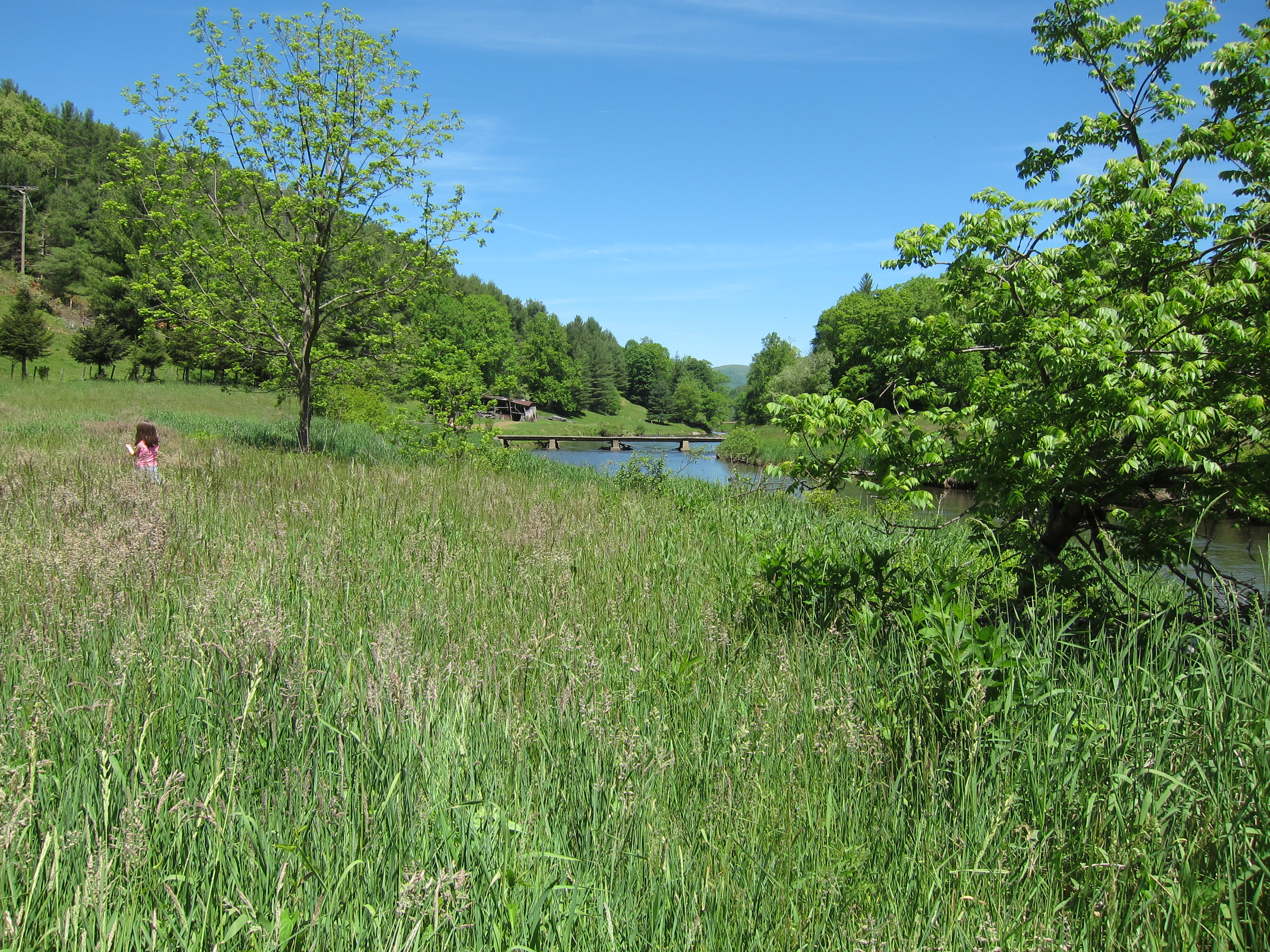
The South Fork of the New River in Todd

Communities within the township include Brownwood, Todd, and Woodford.

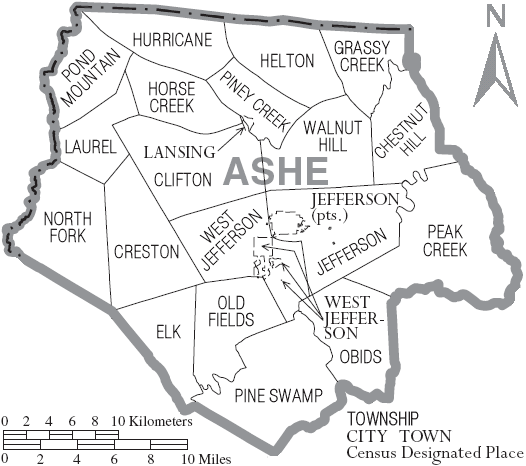
Map of Ashe County with municipal and township labels
