= Creston Township =

Creston Township may refer to the following places in the United States:

- Creston Township, Platte County, Nebraska
- Creston Township, Ashe County, North Carolina
