= Bina, North Carolina =

- Unincorporated community
- Location of Bina in North Carolina Bina, North Carolina (the United States)
- Coordinates: 36°29′01″N 81°29′56″W
- Country: United States
- State: North Carolina
- County: Ashe
- Elevation: 2,674 ft (815 m)
- Time zone: UTC-5 (Eastern (EST))
  - Summer (DST): UTC-4 (EDT)
- Area code: 336
- GNIS feature ID: 1019181
- Other name: Berlin

Bina is an unincorporated community in Ashe County, North Carolina, United States. It is located southeast of Lansing on North Carolina Highway 194, along with West Deep Ford Road and McNeil Road.

The Virginia–Carolina Railway was an interstate railroad in southwestern Virginia and northwestern North Carolina. It ran from Abingdon in Washington County, Virginia to Todd in Ashe County. The line charted a complicated course through the mountains through Bina, crossing the Blue Ridge near Mount Rogers.
