= Comet, North Carolina =

- Unincorporated community
- Location of Comet in North Carolina Comet, North Carolina (the United States)
- Coordinates: 36°28′55″N 81°33′16″W
- Country: United States
- State: North Carolina
- County: Ashe
- Elevation: 2,926 ft (892 m)
- Time zone: UTC-5 (Eastern (EST))
  - Summer (DST): UTC-4 (EDT)
- ZIP code: 28643
- Area code: 336
- FIPS code: 37-37009
- GNIS feature ID: 1019748

Comet is an unincorporated community in Ashe County, North Carolina, United States, located west of Warrensville.
