= Shatley Springs, North Carolina =

Shatley Springs
- Unincorporated community
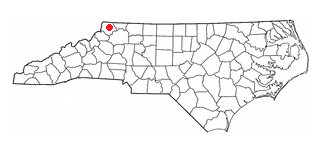
- Location within the U.S. state of North Carolina

- Location within the U.S. state of North Carolina
- Coordinates: 36.47°N 81.40°W
- Country: United States
- State: North Carolina
- County: Ashe
- Named for: Martin Shatley
- Time zone: UTC-5 (EST)
  - Summer (DST): UTC-4 (EDT)
- ZIP Code: 28617
- Area codes: 336, 743

Shatley Springs is an unincorporated community in Ashe County, North Carolina, United States.

== Geography ==
Shatley Springs is located in northeastern Ashe County, along North Carolina Highway 16. The community is centered on the historic Shatley Springs Inn.

The ZIP Code for Shatley Springs is 28617.

== Population ==
In 2023, the population estimate for ZIP Code 28617 was 1,469.
