= Grayson, North Carolina =

Unincorporated community in North Carolina, US

Coordinates: 36°32′10″N 81°41′01″W

Grayson is an unincorporated community in Ashe County, North Carolina, United States, located northeast of Creston. It lies at an elevation of 3,343 feet (1,019 m).
