= Ashe County High School =

Public school in North Carolina, U.S.

Location
- 184 Campus Drive; West Jefferson, North Carolina 28694; United States
- 36°23′32″N 81°28′41″W

Information
- Type: Public
- Established: 1999 (27 years ago)
- School district: Ashe County Schools
- CEEB code: 344270
- Principal: Dustin Farmer
- Teaching staff: 52.96 (FTE)
- Grades: 9–12
- Enrollment: 778 (2023–2024)
- Student to teacher ratio: 14.69
- Colors: Purple, white, silver, black accents
- Mascot: Husky
- Rival: Watauga Pioneers
- Yearbook: The Paw Print
- Website: https://ashs.asheschools.org/

Ashe County High School is a public high school serving grades 9–12, located in West Jefferson, North Carolina, United States. It is one of two high schools in the Ashe County Schools system.

== History ==
The school was established in 1999, when the county consolidated its three high schools. Previously, high school students in Ashe County attended either Ashe Central High School in Jefferson, Beaver Creek High School in West Jefferson, or Northwest Ashe High School in Warrensville. The average class size is 15–18 students.

== Performance ==
Student performance exceeds the North Carolina state average in all tested areas. The 84% graduation rate exceeds the state's 70% average.

== Awards ==
Math Teacher Carmen Wilson was named North Carolina Teacher of The Year in 2001–2002.

In 2008, U.S. News & World Report ranked Ashe County High School among the top 1500 public high schools in the country, placing it in the Bronze category, among the 18,000 schools reviewed.

Ashe County High School won the 2012 NC Spirit of Sport Award from the NCHSAA (North Carolina High School Athletic Association).

In 2015, Keanna Triplett, an English teacher, was named the Burroughs Wellcome Fund North Carolina Teacher of the Year.

== Curriculum ==
Ashe County High School offers a full selection of courses in several areas, supported by the following departments:

- Auto Tech
- Agriculture
- Business
- Consumer Science
- Cultural Arts
- English
- Exceptional Children
- Foreign Language
- Guidance
- Health Science
- JROTC
- Math
- Physical Education
- Science
- Social Studies
- Trade and Industrial
- Vocational

== Extracurricular activities ==
=== Marching Band ===
The Husky Vanguard Marching Band was one of 25 bands representing 17 states nationwide at the 2006 Toyota Gator Bowl in Jacksonville, Florida. The band also performed at the 2002 Nokia Sugar Bowl in New Orleans, Louisiana and the 2004 FedEx Orange Bowl in Miami, Florida. In 2008, the Marching Band performed at the BCS Championship game in New Orleans, Louisiana. There, the group competed with nine other bands from many eastern states and won the title of "Best in Class." Over several years, the Husky Vanguard Marching Band has won numerous awards and titles.

=== Sports ===
Ashe County is in the Northwestern 3a/4a Conference, starting 2021–22. Prior to the 2021–22 school year, Ashe County competed in the Mountain Valley 1a/2a conference. Teams compete in the following sports:

- Baseball
- Basketball
- Cheerleading
- Cross Country
- Football
- Golf
- Soccer
- Softball
- Swimming
- Tennis
- Track & Field
- Volleyball
- Wrestling

The school was 1a/2a Mountain Valley Conference football champions in 2006, 2007, 2013, 2014, 2019, 2020 and 2021 and men's MVAC basketball champions in 2009–10 and 2020–21. Women's basketball were the Mountain Valley Conference regular season and tournament champions in 2005, 2009, 2010, 2011, 2012, and regular season tri-champions in 2020.
