= Parker, North Carolina =

Unincorporated community in North Carolina, US

Coordinates: 36°27′28″N 81°41′21″W

Parker is an unincorporated community in Ashe County, North Carolina, United States, on North Carolina Highway 88. It lies at an elevation of 3,136 feet (956 m). Parker was given the name due to the early settlers (the Parker family) who inhabited the area. Jesse Parker (1805-1871) is the earliest documented Parker who resided in the area.
