= Ashe County, North Carolina =

County in North Carolina, United States

- County
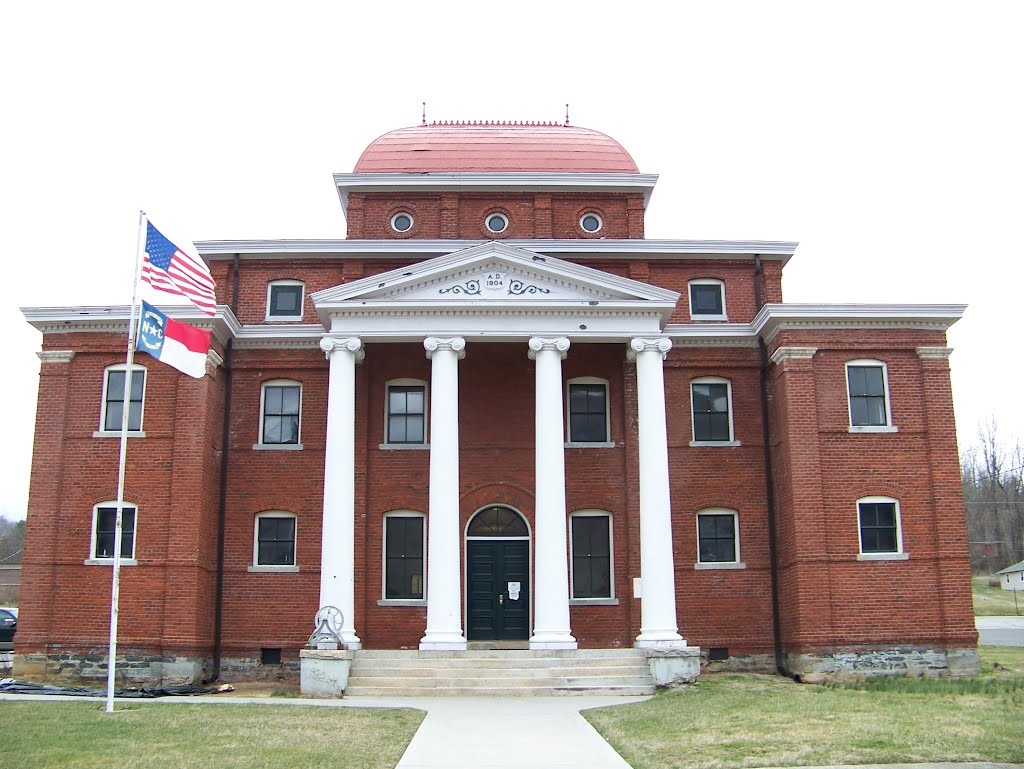
- Ashe County Courthouse in Jefferson

- Flag Seal

- Location within the U.S. state of North Carolina
- Interactive map of Ashe County, North Carolina
- Coordinates: 36.44°N 81.50°W
- Country: United States
- State: North Carolina
- Founded: 1799
- Named for: Samuel Ashe
- Seat: Jefferson
- Largest community: Jefferson

Area
  - Total: 429.37 sq mi (1,112.1 km^{2})
  - Land: 426.26 sq mi (1,104.0 km^{2})
  - Water: 3.11 sq mi (8.1 km^{2}) 0.72%

Population (2020)
  - Total: 26,577
  - Estimate (2025): 27,514 ▲
  - Density: 62.35/sq mi (24.07/km^{2})
- Time zone: UTC−5 (Eastern)
  - Summer (DST): UTC−4 (EDT)
- Congressional district: 5th
- Website: www.ashecountygov.com

Ashe County (/ˈæʃ/ ASH) is a county located in the U.S. state of North Carolina. The population was 26,577 at the 2020 census. Its county seat is Jefferson.

== History ==
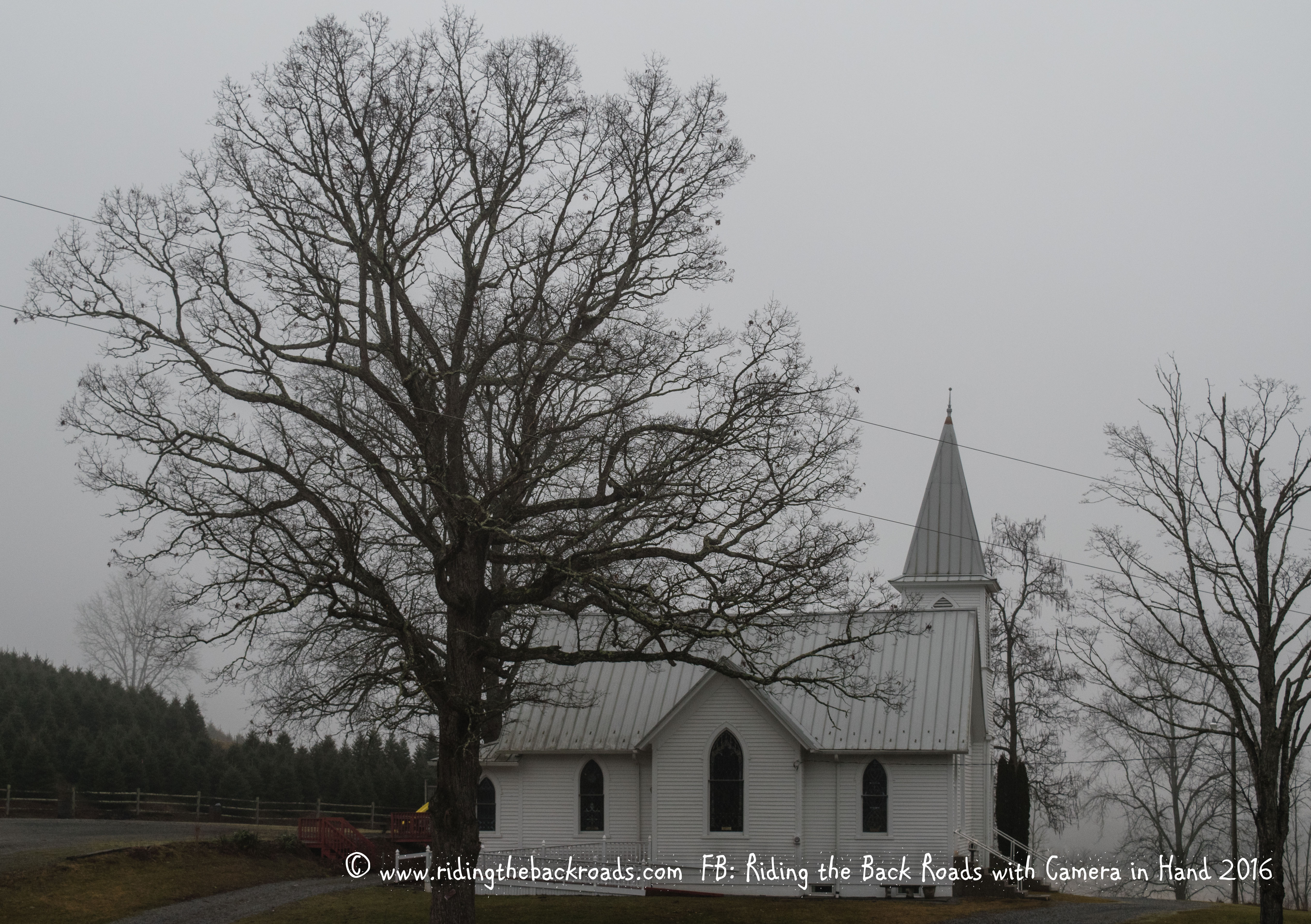
Grassy Creek Methodist Church

Historical evidence shows that Ashe County was inhabited by Native Americans, which included the Cherokee, Creek, and Shawnee tribes. Pieces of broken pottery, arrowheads, and other Native American artifacts have been found, indicating their presence. Most of these artifacts have been found in the Old Fields area of Ashe County.

The earliest Europeans to explore Ashe County were Bishop August Gottlieb Spangenberg – head of the Moravian Church in America – and his associates, Timothy Horsefield, Joseph Mueller, Henry Antes, Johan Merck, and Herman Loesch. Bishop Spangenberg wrote about his journey in Ashe in a diary that has been preserved by the Moravian church. He was given 100,000 acres (400 km^{2}) in Virginia as a place for his fellow Moravians to settle. The only one of Spangenberg's group to return and permanently settle in Ashe County was Herman Loesch. Other early settlers were David Helton, William Walling, William McLain and Daniel Boone, the famous pioneer. With the exception of Boone, these men and their families all settled in Ashe in 1771.

During the Revolutionary War one skirmish was fought in Ashe County, the Battle of Big Glades. The battle was fought in July 1780 between a force of Americans, led by Captain Robert Love, and a force of 150 British Loyalists on their way to Charlotte to join Lord Cornwallis, the British commander in the Southern colonies. The Americans won the skirmish.

In the 1780s, Ashe County was a part of the self-declared "State of Franklin", within the boundaries of its Washington County. The "State of Franklin" marked the beginnings of the State of Tennessee. The North Carolina legislature created Ashe County in late 1799 with an area of 977 square miles (2,530 km^{2}). Many family surnames noted in the 1800 Ashe County Census, such as Bare, Barker, Blevins, Hart, Stamper, Miller, Burkett, Gambill, Baldwin, and Ballou, are still present today. Ashe County was named in honor of Samuel Ashe, a Revolutionary patriot, a superior court judge, and the governor of North Carolina from 1795 to 1798.

From 1807 to 1913, the county went through numerous boundary changes. In 1849, to form Watauga County, the southwestern part of Ashe County was combined with parts of Caldwell County, Wilkes County, and Yancey County. Ten years later in 1859, the eastern part of the remainder of Ashe County became Alleghany County.

== Geography ==
According to the U.S. Census Bureau, the county has a total area of 429.37 square miles (1,112.1 km^{2}), of which 426.26 square miles (1,104.0 km^{2}) is land and 3.11 square miles (8.1 km^{2}) (0.72%) is water.

Ashe County is located in extreme northwestern North Carolina. The county is bordered by two states: Virginia on the north; and Tennessee to the west. The county is located entirely within the Appalachian Mountains region of North Carolina. Most of the county is located atop a rolling plateau that ranges from 2,500 to 3,000 feet (760 to 910 m) above sea level. On the county's southeastern border the land drops sharply to about 1,500 feet (460 m) in neighboring Wilkes County, North Carolina. Numerous mountains and hills dot the plateau. In total, five mountains in the county rise to over 5,000 feet (1,500 m). A prominent landmark is Mount Jefferson, which is a State Natural Area and rises to 4,665 feet (1,422 m), and towers more than 1,600 feet (490 m) above the towns of Jefferson and West Jefferson.

The county's main river is the New River, one of the oldest rivers in the world, and one of the few major rivers in the southeastern United States to flow primarily north instead of south, east, or west. 34 creeks and streams flow into the New River in Ashe County. In 1998, the river was designated an "American Heritage River" by President Bill Clinton, and it is famed for its beautiful rural scenery, clear water, fly fishing, and kayaking and canoeing.

Isolated by mountainous terrain from the remainder of North Carolina to the east, Ashe County was described in the 19th and early 20th centuries as one of the Lost Provinces of North Carolina.

Ashe County generally is known for its mountain scenery, and the tourism industry is an important mainstay of the county's economy. The Blue Ridge Parkway runs along the county's southeastern border. Ashe County has historically consisted of rural farmland, with numerous cattle and poultry farms. However, cattle farming in recent decades has given way to the industry of raising Christmas trees. Many cattle farmers have switched to growing Christmas trees. In 1997, 2007, 2008, 2012, 2021, and 2023, an Ashe County Christmas tree was selected as the official White House Christmas Tree by the National Christmas Tree Association. The tree is put on display in the Blue Room (White House). As of 2014, Ashe County grows more Christmas trees than any other county in the Eastern United States.

=== Climate ===
Ashe County has a considerably different climate than most of the southeastern United States. Summers typically average around 80 °F (27 °C). Temperatures rarely exceed 90 °F (32 °C), but on rare occasions can reach the mid-90s °F (~35 °C). 100 °F+ (38 °C+) has never been observed. Summer nights are cool, and temperatures often dip to near 60 °F (16 °C), even in July. In winter there is snow, averaging about 30 inches (0.76 meters) for the towns of Jefferson and West Jefferson during the past thirty years. Considerably more snow falls on the peaks and the western slopes of the Appalachian Mountains. During the 2009–2010 snow season, Jefferson received some 60 inches (1.52 meters) of snow. Snow has been observed as early as around October 1 and as late as around May 1. Ashe County is also a very windy location, especially in winter, when several times each year the Jefferson Airport sees winds gusting 60 to 85 MPH (97 to 137 KPH). Combined with the winds typical for the region, Ashe County can also see extremely cold temperatures during winter. Single digit temperatures, often just above zero Fahrenheit, are observed occasionally in the winter months. The average winter high is around 45 °F (7 °C), with an average winter low near 20 °F (−7 °C). Despite its southerly latitude, these factors can make Ashe County experience winter conditions typically seen in the northeastern United States.

The USDA hardiness zones range from Zone 6A (−10 °F to −5 °F or −23 °C to −21 °C) in northwestern Ashe County, to Zone 7B (5 °F to 10 °F or −15 °C to −12 °C) in areas along the county's southeastern border with Wilkes County.

=== Hurricane Helene ===
Wind and flooding from Hurricane Helene devastated North Carolina on September 27, 2024, primarily in its western Appalachian region, causing at least 108 reported deaths and major destruction of infrastructure and residential areas across several settlements. After making landfall in the Big Bend region of Florida as a Category 4 hurricane on September 27, Helene began to traverse over land across Georgia as a Category 2 hurricane and into the Appalachian mountain range as a tropical storm, depositing record-breaking amounts of rainfall across several settlements in western North Carolina.

Ashe County was severely impacted by Helene due to the multiple large streams in the county, limited infrastructure, and rural population. One fatality was reported in Ashe County due to Hurricane Helene. Extensive damage and destruction occurred across most of the county. While wind caused moderate damage in portions of the county due to fallen trees, the primary threat was flash flooding. Flood damages were largely dependent on proximity to creeks and rivers; as a result, damages were most severe in areas of the county adjacent to the New River and other streams. Nearly all businesses in downtown Lansing sustained major flood damage, as a result of nearby Big Horse Creek overflowing its banks. Downtown West Jefferson sustained relatively minor flood damage, due to no major streams in the vicinity of the community. Portions of Jefferson sustained moderate flood damage. Numerous bridges and low water crossings were washed away. It is expected that the repair of all local roads will take several years. Local public schools were closed for over a month while recovery efforts ensued. Multiple nonprofit organizations, including the American Red Cross and The Salvation Army, have supplemented state and federal support during recovery efforts.

=== National protected areas ===
- Blue Ridge Parkway (part)
- Cherokee National Forest (part)
- Mountain Bogs National Wildlife Refuge

=== State and local protected areas ===
- Mount Jefferson State Natural Area
- New River State Park (part)
- Phoenix Lake, Ashe County Park
- Pond Mountain Game Land
- Three Top Mountain Game Land
- West Jefferson Municipal Park

=== Major water bodies ===
- Big Horse Creek
- Brush Creek
- Cranberry Creek
- Grassy Creek
- Helton Creek
- Hoskin Fork
- Jerd Branch
- Little Horse Creek
- Little Phoenix Creek
- Long Hope Creek
- Mill Creek
- Minner Creek
- New River
- North Fork New River
- Obids Creek
- Roundabout Creek
- South Fork New River

=== Adjacent counties ===
- Grayson County, Virginia – north
- Alleghany County – east
- Wilkes County – southeast
- Watauga County – southwest
- Johnson County, Tennessee – west

=== Major highways ===
- US 221
- US 221 Bus.
- NC 16
- NC 88
- NC 163
- NC 194
- Blue Ridge Parkway

=== Major infrastructure ===
- Ashe County Airport

== Demographics ==
Historical population
Census	Pop.	Note	%±
1800	2,783		—
1810	3,694		32.7%
1820	4,335		17.4%
1830	6,987		61.2%
1840	7,467		6.9%
1850	8,777		17.5%
1860	7,956		−9.4%
1870	9,573		20.3%
1880	14,437		50.8%
1890	15,628		8.2%
1900	19,581		25.3%
1910	19,074		−2.6%
1920	21,001		10.1%
1930	21,019		0.1%
1940	22,664		7.8%
1950	21,878		−3.5%
1960	19,768		−9.6%
1970	19,571		−1.0%
1980	22,325		14.1%
1990	22,209		−0.5%
2000	24,384		9.8%
2010	27,281		11.9%
2020	26,577		−2.6%
2025 (est.)	27,514	▲	3.5%
U.S. Decennial Census; 1790–1960 1900–1990; 1990–2000 2010 2020

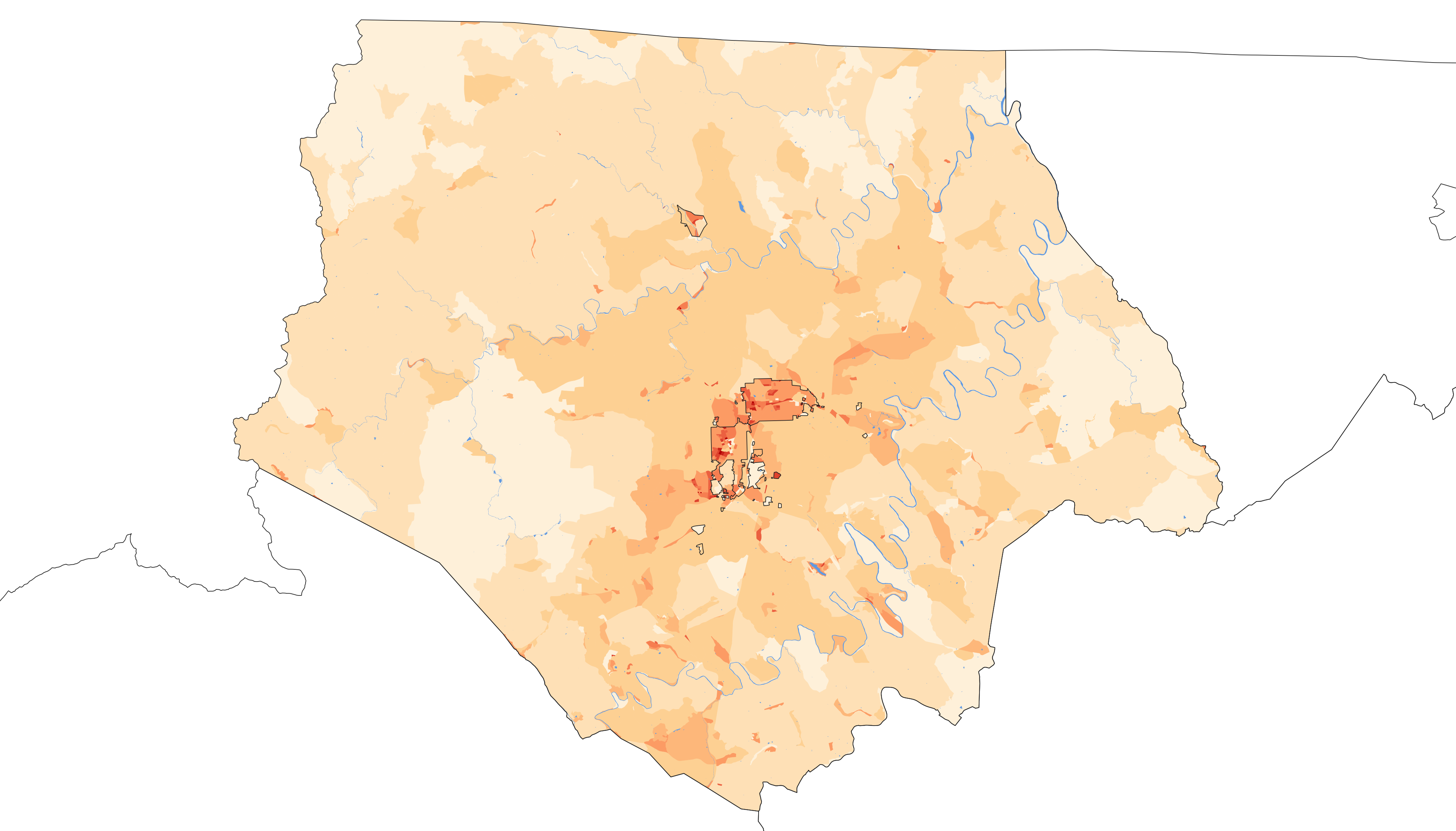
2020 population density of Ashe County NC by census block

=== Racial and ethnic composition ===
Ashe County, North Carolina – Racial and ethnic composition Note: the US Census treats Hispanic/Latino as an ethnic category. This table excludes Latinos from the racial categories and assigns them to a separate category. Hispanics/Latinos may be of any race.
Race / Ethnicity (NH = Non-Hispanic)	Pop 1980	Pop 1990	Pop 2000	Pop 2010	Pop 2020	% 1980	% 1990	% 2000	% 2010	% 2020
White alone (NH)	22,013	21,910	23,440	25,420	24,028	98.60%	98.65%	96.13%	93.18%	90.41%
Black or African American alone (NH)	178	144	155	148	125	0.80%	0.65%	0.64%	0.54%	0.47%
Native American or Alaska Native alone (NH)	15	21	40	56	48	0.07%	0.09%	0.16%	0.21%	0.18%
Asian alone (NH)	16	31	57	105	102	0.07%	0.14%	0.23%	0.38%	0.38%
Native Hawaiian or Pacific Islander alone (NH)	x	x	0	5	12	x	x	0.00%	0.02%	0.05%
Other race alone (NH)	8	1	5	5	43	0.04%	0.00%	0.02%	0.02%	0.16%
Mixed race or Multiracial (NH)	x	x	97	231	700	x	x	0.40%	0.85%	2.63%
Hispanic or Latino (any race)	95	102	590	1,311	1,519	0.43%	0.46%	2.42%	4.81%	5.72%
Total	22,325	22,209	24,384	27,281	26,577	100.00%	100.00%	100.00%	100.00%	100.00%

=== 2020 census ===
As of the 2020 census, there were 26,577 people, 11,708 households, and 7,894 families residing in the county. The median age was 50.0 years, 17.3% of residents were under the age of 18, and 27.2% of residents were 65 years of age or older. For every 100 females there were 97.7 males, and for every 100 females age 18 and over there were 95.7 males age 18 and over.

Of the households, 22.1% had children under the age of 18 living in them. 51.8% were married-couple households, 17.7% were households with a male householder and no spouse or partner present, and 25.6% were households with a female householder and no spouse or partner present. About 30.0% of households were made up of individuals and 15.8% had someone living alone who was 65 years of age or older.

There were 16,935 housing units, of which 30.9% were vacant. Among occupied housing units, 76.9% were owner-occupied and 23.1% were renter-occupied. The homeowner vacancy rate was 2.5% and the rental vacancy rate was 10.3%.

Less than 0.1% of residents lived in urban areas, while 100.0% lived in rural areas.

The county's racial composition was 90.41% White (non-Hispanic), 0.47% Black or African American (non-Hispanic), 0.18% Native American, 0.38% Asian, 0.05% Pacific Islander, 2.8% Other/Mixed, and 5.72% Hispanic or Latino of any race.

As of the 2020 census, Ashe County has the most proportionately white population among any county in the state.

=== 2010 census ===
At the 2010 census, there were 27,281 people, 11,755 households, and 8,030 families residing in the county. The population density was 60 people per square mile (23 people/km^{2}). There were 17,342 total housing units at an average density of 37 units per square mile (14 units/km^{2}). Of the total 11,755 housing units were occupied.

The racial makeup of the county was:

- 95.5% White
- 0.6% Black or African American
- 0.2% Native American
- 0.4% Asian
- 0.01% Pacific Islander
- 2.2% from other races
- 1.0% from two or more races.

4.8% of the population was Hispanic or Latino of any race.

There were 11,755 households, out of which 23.1% had children under the age of 18 living with them, 54.5% were married couples living together, 9.3% had a female householder with no husband present, and 31.7% were non-families. 27.5% of all households were made up of individuals, and 13.0% had someone living alone who was 65 years of age or older. The average household size was 2.29 and the average family size was 2.75.

In the county, the age distribution of the population shows 10.5% under 10, 10.9% from 10 to 19, 9.9% from 20 to 29, 11.6% from 30 to 39, 13.8% from 40 to 49, 15.2% from 50 to 59, 14% from 60 to 69, 8.7% from 70 to 79, and 5.1% who were 80 years of age or older. The median age was 45.5 years. For every 100 females, there were 97.80 males. For every 100 females age 18 and over, there were 96.39 males.

The per capita income was $20,706 and the median household income was $34,056. 18.1% of the population was below the poverty level.

=== 2000 census ===
At the 2000 census, there were 24,384 people, 10,411 households, and 7,423 families residing in the county. The population density was 57 people per square mile (22 people/km^{2}). There were 13,268 housing units at an average density of 31 units per square mile (12 units/km^{2}).

The racial makeup of the county was:

- 97.16% White
- 0.66% Black or African American
- 0.32% Native American
- 0.23% Asian
- 0.01% Pacific Islander
- 1.05% from other races
- 0.56% from two or more races.

2.42% of the population was Hispanic or Latino of any race.

There were 10,411 households, out of which 26.20% had children under the age of 18 living with them, 59.40% were married couples living together, 8.40% had a female householder with no husband present, and 28.70% were non-families. 25.80% of all households were made up of individuals, and 12.10% had someone living alone who was 65 years of age or older. The average household size was 2.31 and the average family size was 2.75.

In the county, the age distribution of the population shows 19.80% under the age of 18, 7.50% from 18 to 24, 27.00% from 25 to 44, 27.70% from 45 to 64, and 18.00% who were 65 years of age or older. The median age was 42 years. For every 100 females, there were 97.40 males. For every 100 females age 18 and over, there were 94.90 males.

The median income for a household in the county was $28,824, and the median income for a family was $36,052. Males had a median income of $25,666 versus $19,983 for females. The per capita income for the county was $16,429. About 10.10% of families and 13.50% of the population were below the poverty line, including 16.30% of those under age 18 and 17.30% of those ages 65 and over.

== Government and politics ==
Like much of Appalachia, Ashe County is a strongly Republican county. The last Democratic presidential nominee to carry Ashe County was Jimmy Carter in 1976, and the last to reach forty percent of the county's vote was Bill Clinton in 1992. Recent elections have seen Ashe trend rapidly towards the Republican Party. Hillary Clinton and Joe Biden won just 26 percent of the county vote in 2016 and 2020, respectively. However, Kamala Harris performed marginally better in 2024, winning 27 percent of the vote in Ashe.

In 2024, Ashe County was one of 10 counties in western North Carolina that voted more Democratic than in 2020, shifting by nearly 2 points.

United States presidential election results for Ashe County, North Carolina
Year	Republican		Democratic		Third party(ies)	
Year	No.	%	No.	%	No.	%
1912	478	14.21%	1,643	48.86%	1,242	36.93%
1916	1,939	50.53%	1,898	49.47%	0	0.00%
1920	3,808	52.60%	3,431	47.40%	0	0.00%
1924	3,952	47.68%	4,333	52.28%	3	0.04%
1928	4,337	55.64%	3,458	44.36%	0	0.00%
1932	3,871	44.70%	4,751	54.86%	38	0.44%
1936	4,557	45.08%	5,552	54.92%	0	0.00%
1940	4,175	46.96%	4,716	53.04%	0	0.00%
1944	4,524	50.91%	4,363	49.09%	0	0.00%
1948	4,266	46.74%	4,633	50.76%	228	2.50%
1952	4,563	50.15%	4,536	49.85%	0	0.00%
1956	4,588	53.54%	3,982	46.46%	0	0.00%
1960	4,823	51.86%	4,477	48.14%	0	0.00%
1964	4,191	45.77%	4,965	54.23%	0	0.00%
1968	4,894	53.15%	3,426	37.21%	888	9.64%
1972	5,784	62.95%	3,313	36.06%	91	0.99%
1976	4,937	48.62%	5,193	51.14%	25	0.25%
1980	5,643	54.72%	4,461	43.26%	208	2.02%
1984	6,611	62.10%	4,009	37.66%	25	0.23%
1988	6,019	59.69%	4,034	40.01%	30	0.30%
1992	5,200	46.97%	4,624	41.77%	1,246	11.26%
1996	5,203	52.33%	3,825	38.47%	914	9.19%
2000	6,226	60.35%	4,011	38.88%	79	0.77%
2004	7,292	61.68%	4,477	37.87%	54	0.46%
2008	7,916	60.57%	4,872	37.28%	281	2.15%
2012	8,242	65.36%	4,116	32.64%	252	2.00%
2016	9,412	70.11%	3,500	26.07%	512	3.81%
2020	11,451	72.41%	4,164	26.33%	199	1.26%
2024	11,629	71.55%	4,431	27.26%	193	1.19%

Ashe County is governed by a five-member Board of County Commissioners. In the North Carolina Senate, Ashe County lies in the 47th district and is represented by Republican Ralph Hise. In the North Carolina House of Representatives, Ashe County lies in the 93rd district and is represented by Republican Ray Pickett.

In the United States House of Representatives, Ashe County lies in North Carolina's 5th congressional district and is represented by Republican Virginia Foxx.

Ashe County is a member of the regional High Country Council of Governments.

== Media ==
The Ashe Post and Times is the newspaper of record for Ashe County, serving readers with the latest news and events throughout the county. It is a weekly, paid circulation newspaper that is published every Wednesday. The newspaper is owned by Adams Publishing Group, which also owns the Watauga Democrat.

== Education ==
Public education is provided by Ashe County Schools. Included in the District are Ashe County High School and Ashe County Early College High School.

== Communities ==
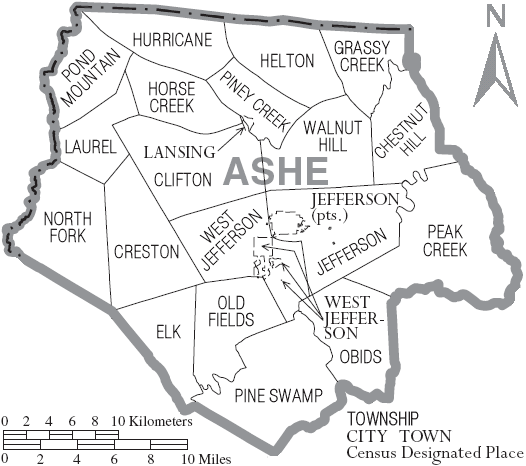
Map of Ashe County with municipal and township labels

=== Towns ===
- Jefferson (county seat and largest community)
- Lansing
- West Jefferson

=== Townships ===
- Chestnut Hill
- Clifton
- Creston
- Elk
- Grassy Creek
- Helton
- Horse Creek
- Hurricane
- Jefferson
- Laurel
- North Fork
- Obids
- Old Fields
- Peak Creek
- Pine Swamp
- Piney Creek
- Pond Mountain
- Walnut Hill
- West Jefferson

=== Unincorporated communities ===
- Apple Grove
- Ashland
- Baldwin
- Beaver Creek
- Bina
- Brandon
- Brownwood
- Chestnut Hill
- Clifton
- Comet
- Creston
- Crumpler
- Fig
- Fleetwood
- Glendale Springs
- Grassy Creek
- Grayson
- Helton
- Husk
- Idlewild
- Nathans Creek
- Obids
- Orion
- Parker
- Scottville (mostly in Alleghany County)
- Shatley Springs
- Smethport
- Sturgills
- Sutherland
- Todd (partly in Watauga County)
- Toliver
- Tuckerdale
- Wagoner
- Warrensville
- Weavers Ford
- Woodford
- Yates

=== Population ranking ===
The population ranking of the following table is based on the 2020 census of Ashe County.

† = county seat

Rank	Name	Type	Population (2020 census)
1	† Jefferson	Town	1,622
2	West Jefferson	Town	1,279
3	Lansing	Town	126

== Notable people ==
- Daniel Boone, American pioneer and frontiersman who resided in Ashe County for several years
- G. B. Grayson, fiddler
- Monte Weaver, Major League Baseball player who played as a pitcher from 1931 to 1939

=== Notable visits to Ashe County ===
- In 1998, President Bill Clinton and Vice President Al Gore, held a ceremony on the banks of the scenic New River to designate it as an American Heritage River. After the ceremony, both men had lunch at the historic Glendale Springs Inn, also located in Ashe County.
- Helen Keller, visited an Ashe County native, Marvin Osborne, in 1944 when he was wounded in France in World War II
- Loretta Lynn, sang at the Central Food Market (now a locally owned restaurant) in West Jefferson in the late 1960s
- Roni Stoneman, visitor to Ashe Park in the 1980s

== See also ==
- List of counties in North Carolina
- National Register of Historic Places listings in Ashe County, North Carolina
- North Carolina–Tennessee–Virginia Corners
- Holy Communion Episcopal Parish
