= Creston Township, Ashe County, North Carolina =

Township in Ashe County, North Carolina, U.S.

Coordinates: 36.396°N 81.611°W

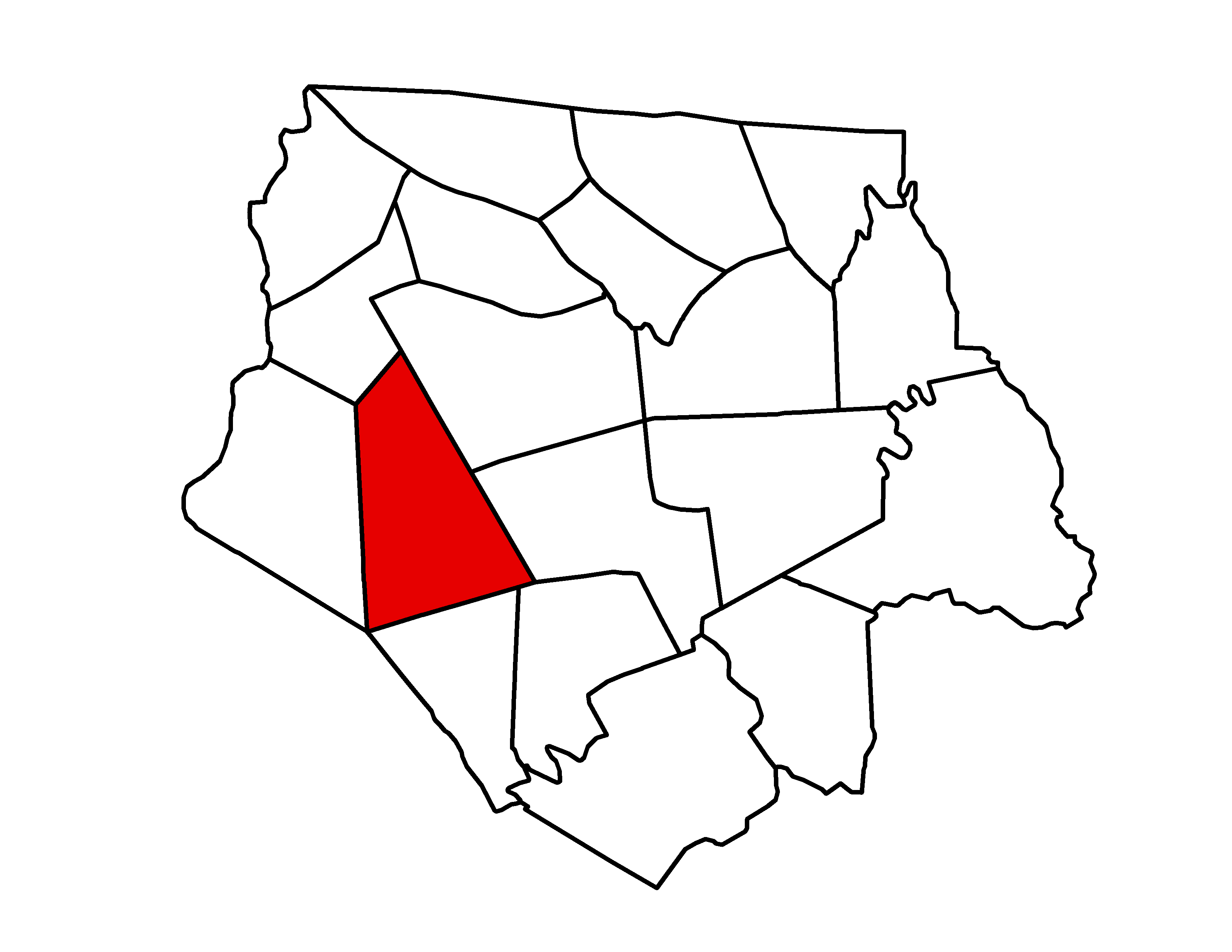
Location of Creston Township in Ashe County, N.C.

Creston Township is one of nineteen townships in Ashe County, North Carolina, United States. The township has a population of 612 as of the 2010 census.

Creston Township occupies 28.9 square miles (74.8 km^{2}) in central Ashe County.
