= Creston High School =

Creston High School may refer to:

- Creston High School (Iowa), Creston, Iowa
- Creston High School (Michigan), Grand Rapids, Michigan, opened in 1923 as Creston Junior High School; closed in 2013, and its building became the campus of Grand Rapids City High-Middle School
- Creston High School (Washington), Creston, Washington
