= Creston, North Carolina =

Unincorporated community in North Carolina, U.S.

Creston
- Unincorporated community
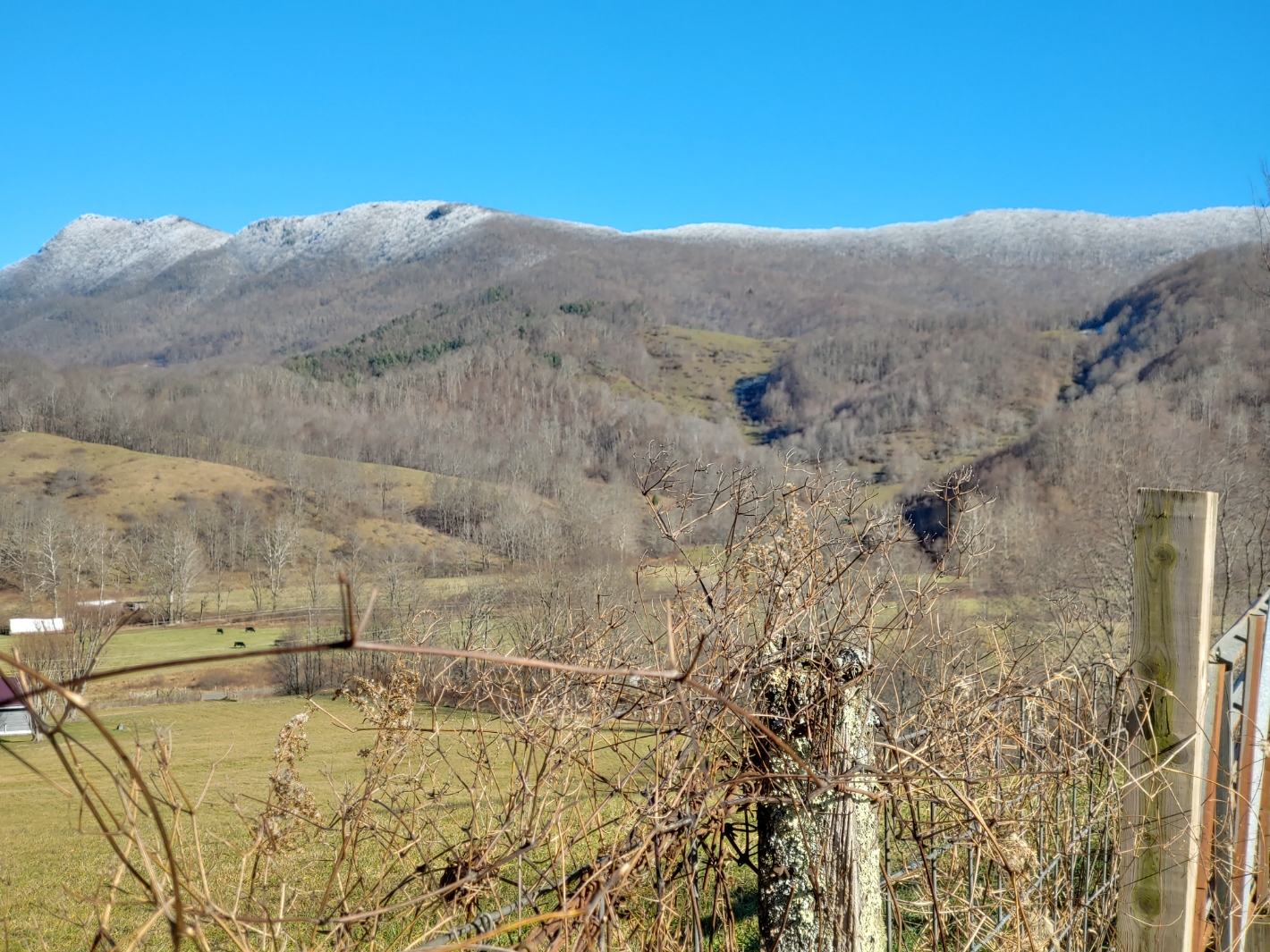
- View of Creston from Sutherland Road

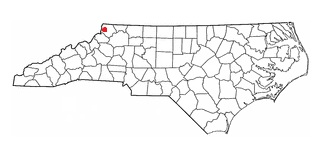
- Location within the U.S. state of North Carolina
- Coordinates: 36.42°N 81.62°W
- Country: United States
- State: North Carolina
- County: Ashe
- Elevation: 2,861 ft (872 m)
- Time zone: UTC-5 (EST)
  - Summer (DST): UTC-4 (EDT)
- ZIP Code: 28615
- Area codes: 336, 743

Creston is an unincorporated community in Ashe County, North Carolina, United States.

== Geography ==
Creston is located in western Ashe County, southwest of Grayson. The community lies at an elevation of 2,861 feet (872 m).

The ZIP Code for Creston is 28615.

== History ==
Worth's Chapel was listed on the National Register of Historic Places in 1976.
