= Fig, North Carolina =

Unincorporated community in North Carolina, US

Coordinates: 36°27′10″N 81°36′15″W

Fig is an unincorporated community in Ashe County, North Carolina, United States, southwest of Clifton. It lies at an elevation of 2,802 feet (854 m).

== History ==
A post office called Fig was established in 1888 and remained in operation until it was discontinued in 1969. The community was named for the common fig.
