= Helton Creek Falls =

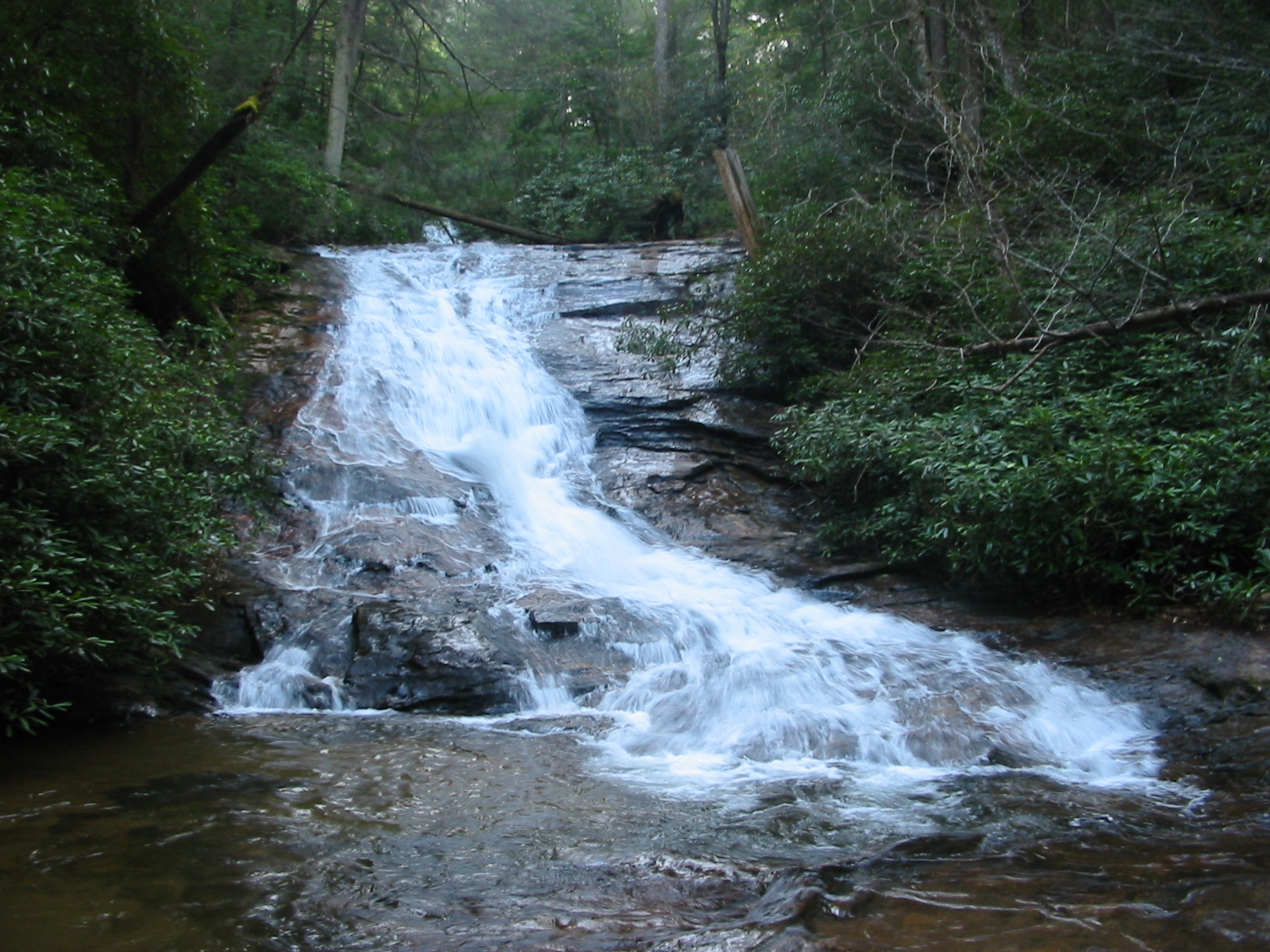
- Lower Helton Creek Falls
- Interactive map of Helton Creek Falls
- Location: Union County, Georgia
- Coordinates: 34.753333°N 83.895°W
- Type: Cascade
- Watercourse: Helton Creek

Helton Creek Falls is a series of two big waterfalls located within the Chattahoochee National Forest in Union County, Georgia.

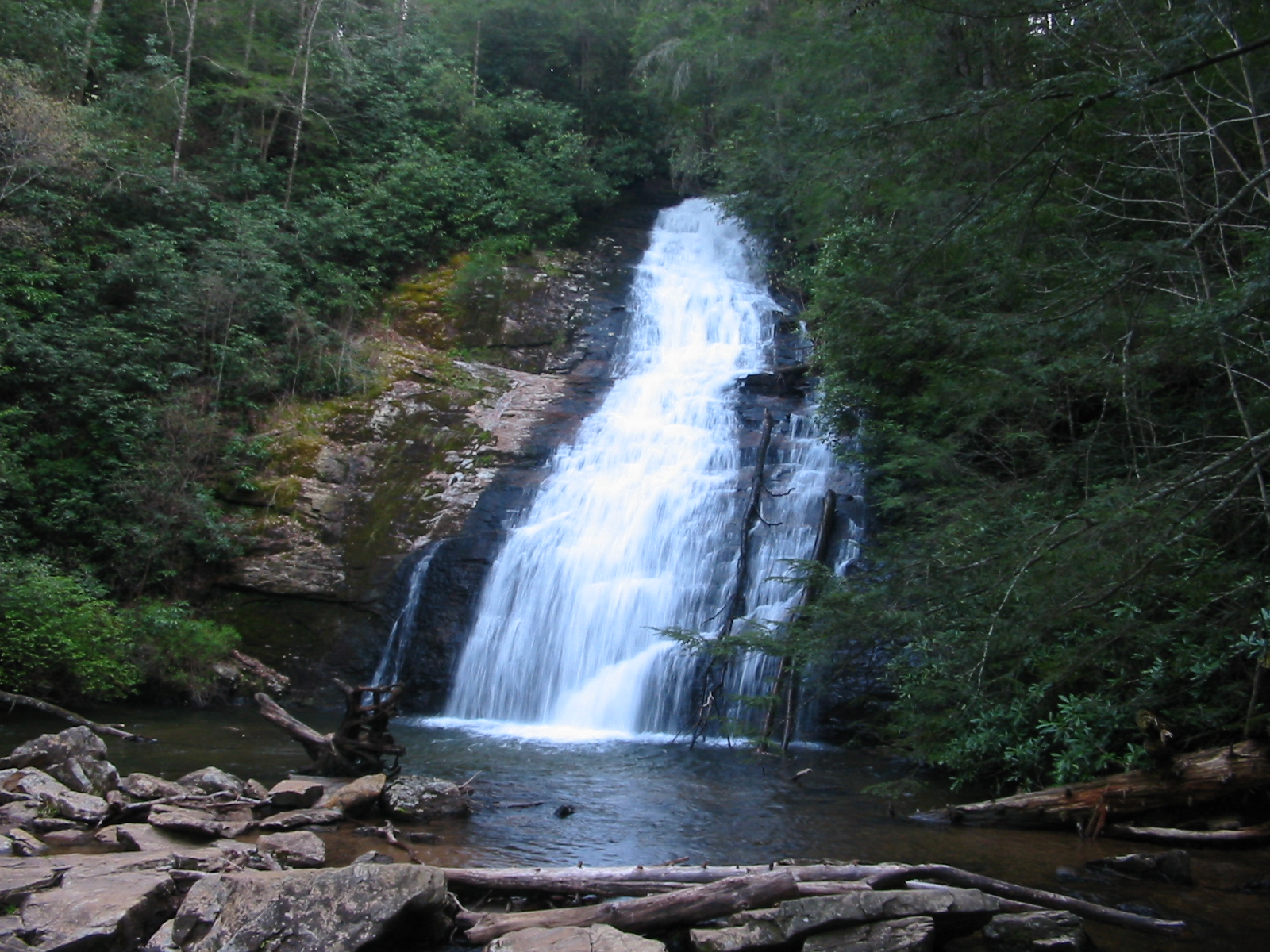
Upper Helton Creek Falls

The site is open to the public and free to visit. Access to the falls is provided by a gravel road and a 0.3 miles (0.48 km) trail. There are two wooden observation decks. The combined height of the lower and upper falls is more than 100 feet (30 m).

== See also ==
- List of waterfalls
