= Chestnut Hill Township, Ashe County, North Carolina =

Township in Ashe County, North Carolina, U.S.

Coordinates: 36.502°N 81.359°W

Chestnut Hill Township
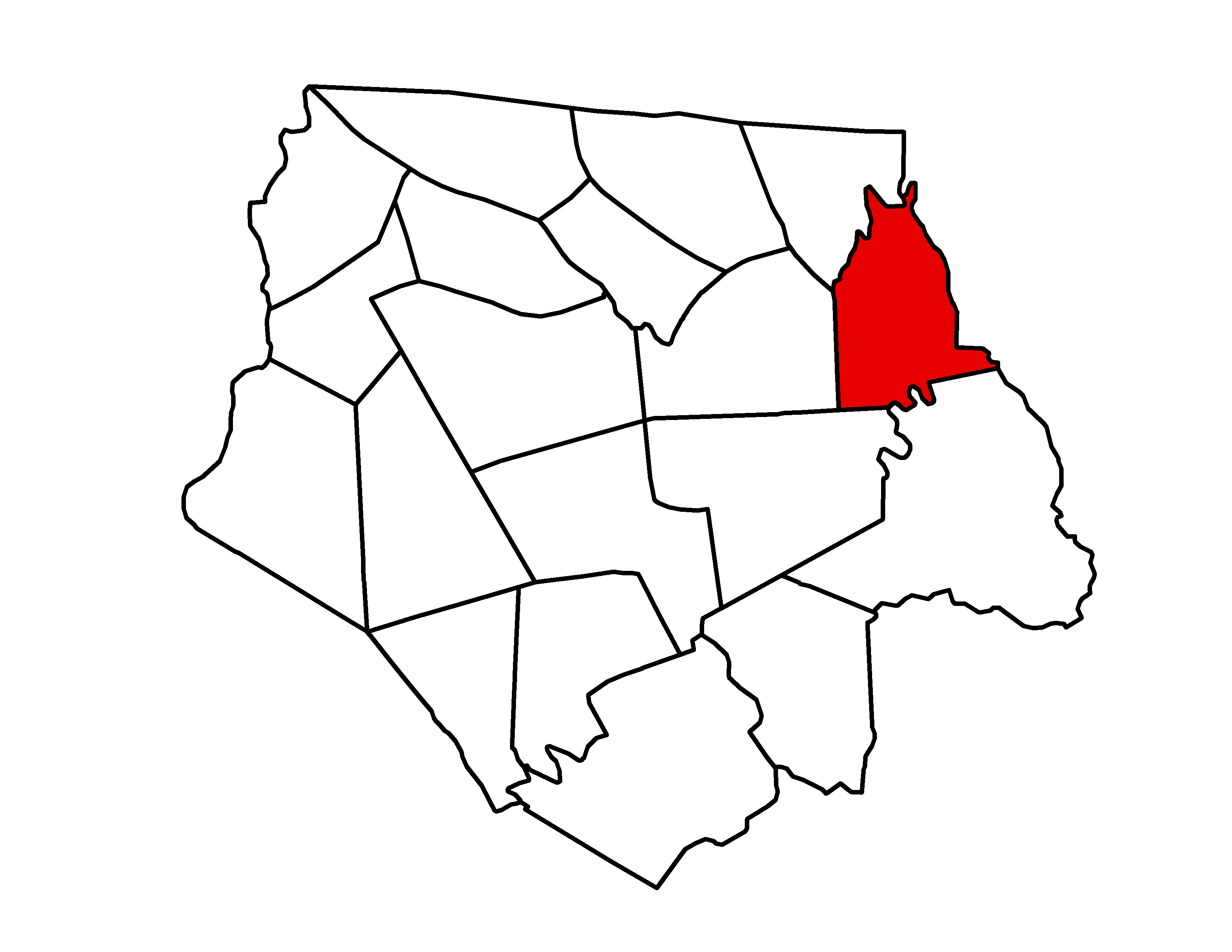
- Location of Chestnut Hill Township within Ashe County

- Location of Ashe County within North Carolina
- Country: United States
- State: North Carolina
- County: Ashe

Population (2020)
  - Total: 830
- Time zone: UTC-5 (EST)
  - Summer (DST): UTC-4 (EDT)
- Area codes: 336, 743

Chestnut Hill Township is a township in Ashe County, North Carolina, United States.

== Geography and population ==
Chestnut Hill Township is one of 19 townships in Ashe County. It is 21.5 square miles (55.8 km^{2}) in total area. The township is located in northeastern Ashe County.

In 2020, the population of the township was 830.

Chestnut Hill Township is bordered to the north by Grassy Creek Township, to the east by Alleghany County, to the south by Peak Creek Township, to the southwest by Jefferson Township, and to the west by Walnut Hill Township.

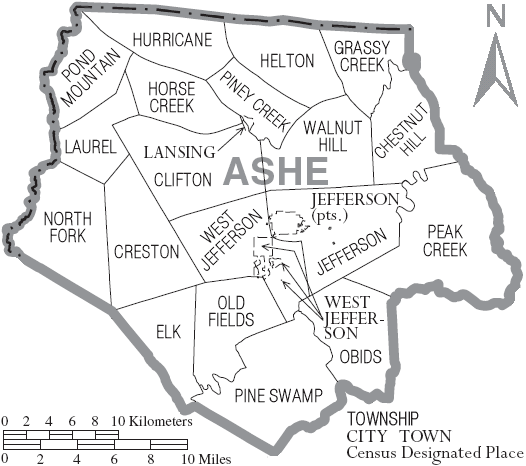
Map of Ashe County with municipal and township labels
