= Ashe County Early College High School =

School in West Jefferson, North Carolina, United States

Location
- 363 Campus Drive; West Jefferson, North Carolina 28694; United States; 36°23′39″N 81°28′34″W

Information
- Type: Public
- Motto: Rising to the Challenge
- Established: 2018 (8 years ago)
- School district: Ashe County Schools
- CEEB code: 341931
- Principal: Lindsey Williams
- Grades: 9–13
- Enrollment: 129 (2023–2024)
- Campus type: Rural
- Colors: Purple, Silver, White, Yellow
- Mascot: Cougar
- Website: https://earlycollege.asheschools.org/

Ashe County Early College High School (also known as Ashe County Early College) is a public high school serving grades 9–13, located in West Jefferson, North Carolina, United States. It is one of two high schools in the Ashe County Schools system.

== History ==
The school was established in 2018, after partnering with Wilkes Community College to provide eligible students the opportunity to earn an associate's degree at little to no cost, in addition to their high school diploma.

== Performance ==
Student performance exceeds the North Carolina state average in all tested areas. The >95% graduation rate exceeds the state's 87% average.

== Awards ==
In 2024, ACEC principal Lindsey Williams was awarded Principal of the Year by Ashe County Schools. That same year, ACEC math teacher Jim Ashley was awarded Teacher of the Year by Ashe County Schools.
