= Clifton, North Carolina =

Unincorporated community in North Carolina, US

Coordinates: 36°26′48″N 81°34′15″W

Clifton is an unincorporated community in Ashe County, North Carolina, United States, located east of Fig. It lies at an elevation of 2,769 feet (844 m).
