= Husk, North Carolina =

Unincorporated community in North Carolina, U.S.

Husk
- Unincorporated community
- Location within the U.S. state of North Carolina
- Coordinates: 36.57°N 81.55°W
- Country: United States
- State: North Carolina
- County: Ashe
- Time zone: UTC-5 (EST)
  - Summer (DST): UTC-4 (EDT)
- ZIP Code: 28643
- Area codes: 336, 743

Husk is an unincorporated community in Ashe County, North Carolina, United States.

== Geography ==
Husk is located in northwestern Ashe County, north of Lansing. The community is bordered to the north by Virginia.

The ZIP Code for Husk is 28643.
