= Chestnut Hills (Massachusetts) =

Coordinates: 42.6223124°N 71.5509003°W

Chestnut Hills is a range in Middlesex County, in the U.S. state of Massachusetts. The range is approximately one mile (1.6 km) northeast of Groton.

Chestnut Hills was named for the chestnut timber in the area.
