= Helton Township, Ashe County, North Carolina =

Township in Ashe County, North Carolina, U.S.

Coordinates: 36.5528466°N 81.4828198°W

Helton Township
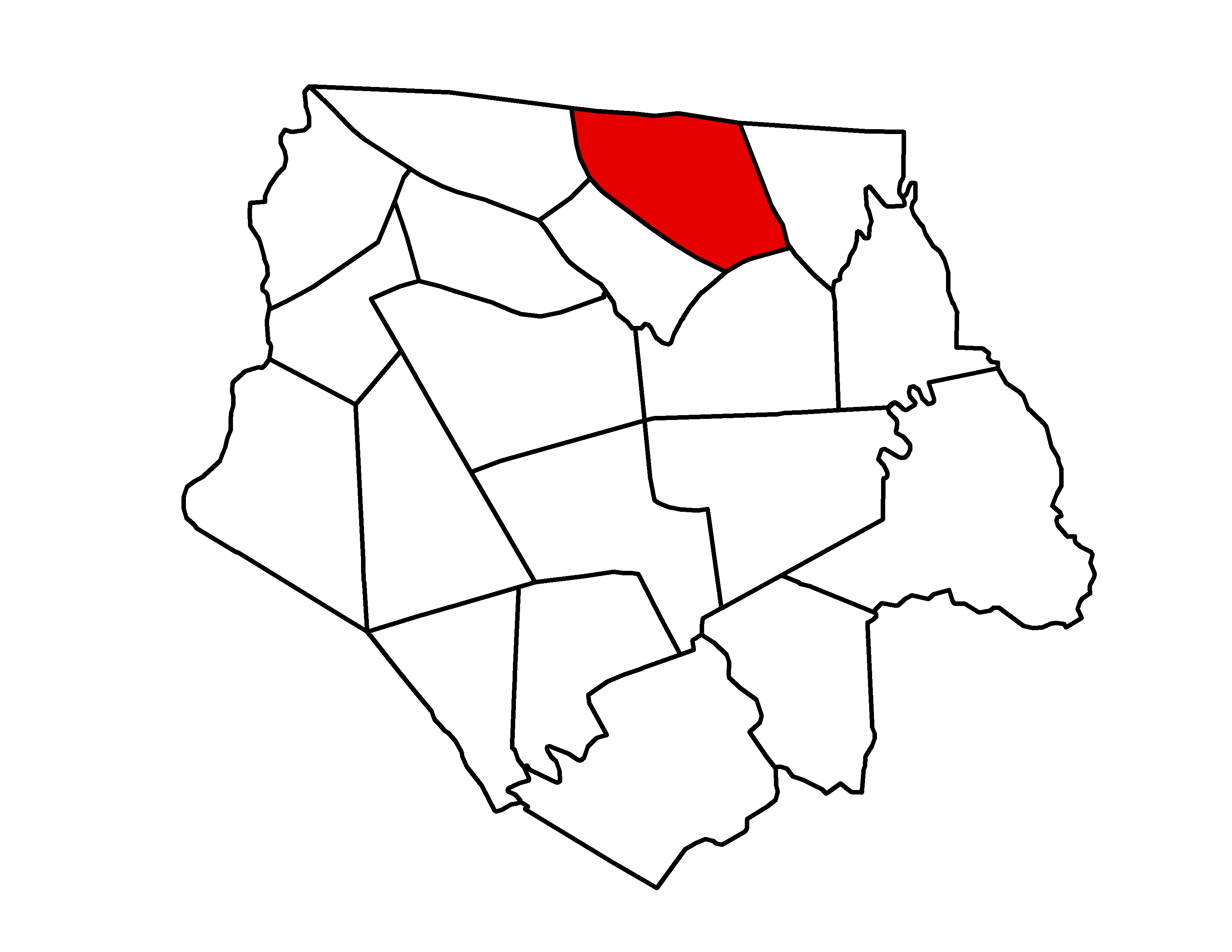
- Location of Helton Township within Ashe County

- Location of Ashe County within North Carolina
- Country: United States
- State: North Carolina
- County: Ashe

Area
  - Total: 18.3 sq mi (47 km^{2})

Population (2020)
  - Total: 640
- Time zone: UTC-5 (EST)
  - Summer (DST): UTC-4 (EDT)
- Area codes: 336, 743

Helton Township is a township in Ashe County, North Carolina, United States.

== Geography and population ==
Helton Township is one of 19 townships in Ashe County. It is 18.3 square miles (47 km^{2}) in total area. The township is located in northern Ashe County.

In 2020, the population of Helton Township was 640.

Communities within the township include Helton and Sturgills.

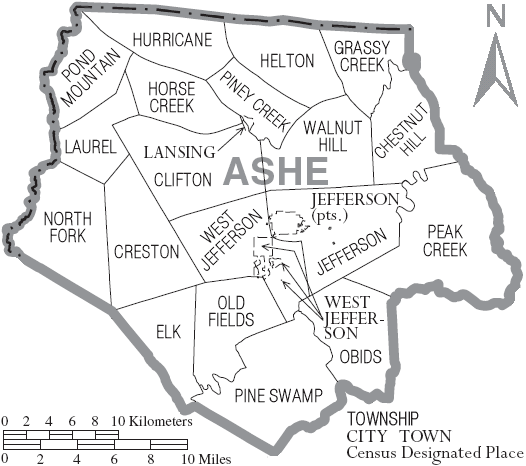
Map of Ashe County with municipal and township labels
