= Creston, South Dakota =

Unincorporated community in South Dakota, U.S.

Coordinates: 43°54′38″N 102°41′56″W

Creston is an unincorporated community in Pennington County, in the U.S. state of South Dakota.

== History ==
A post office called Creston was established in 1886, and remained in operation until 1946. The community's name is a transfer from Creston, Iowa.
