= Monte Weaver =

American baseball player (1906–1994)

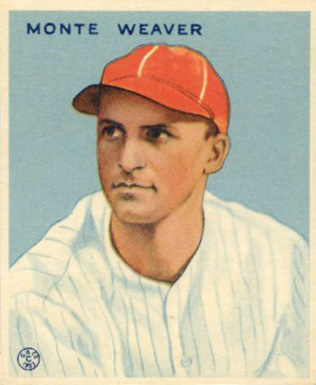
- Pitcher
- Born: June 15, 1906; Helton, North Carolina, U.S.
- Died: June 14, 1994 (aged 87); Orlando, Florida, U.S.
- Batted: Left Threw: Right

MLB debut
- September 20, 1931, for the Washington Senators

Last MLB appearance
- July 4, 1939, for the Boston Red Sox

MLB statistics
- Win–loss record: 71–50
- Earned run average: 4.36
- Strikeouts: 297
- Stats at Baseball Reference

Teams
- Washington Senators (1931–1938); Boston Red Sox (1939)

Montie Morton Weaver (professionally known as Monte Weaver) (June 15, 1906 – June 14, 1994) was a Major League Baseball player who played as a pitcher from 1931 to 1939.

Weaver was born June 15, 1906, in Helton, North Carolina.

A 1927 graduate of Emory and Henry College, Weaver went on to earn a master’s degree and teach mathematics at the University of Virginia. He played in the minor leagues for the Durham Bulls in Durham, North Carolina, and was called up by the Washington Senators during the 1931 season.

In 1932, Weaver went 22-10 as a rookie in his first full season, but never won more than 12 games in any subsequent season. In 1939, his final season in the big leagues, he played for the Boston Red Sox.

In 1972, Emory and Henry College inducted him into its Sports Hall of Fame.

Weaver died on June 14, 1994, one day before his 88th birthday.
