= Fleetwood, North Carolina =

- Unincorporated community
- Location within North Carolina Location within the United States
- Coordinates: 36°18′22″N 81°30′48″W
- Country: United States
- State: North Carolina
- County: Ashe
- Elevation: 2,874 ft (876 m)
- Time zone: UTC-5 (Eastern (EST))
  - Summer (DST): UTC-4 (EDT)
- ZIP code: 28626
- Area code: 336
- GNIS feature ID: 985205

Fleetwood is an unincorporated community in Ashe County, North Carolina, United States. Fleetwood is located along Railroad Grade Road near U.S. Route 221, 8.2 miles (13.2 km) south-southwest of Jefferson. Fleetwood has a post office with ZIP code 28626, which opened on July 27, 1898.
