= Helton, North Carolina =

Unincorporated community in North Carolina, U.S.

Helton
- Unincorporated community
- Location within the U.S. state of North Carolina
- Coordinates: 36.54°N 81.46°W
- Country: United States
- State: North Carolina
- County: Ashe
- Elevation: 2,730 ft (830 m)
- Time zone: UTC−5 (EST)
  - Summer (DST): UTC−4 (EDT)
- ZIP Code: 28643
- Area codes: 336, 743

Helton is an unincorporated community and resort town in Ashe County, North Carolina, United States.

Helton is a popular destination among tourists and retirees from Florida, as well as those from the lower elevations of the Carolinas and Georgia.

== Geography ==
Helton is located in northwestern Ashe County, east of Sturgills. The community is bordered to the north by Virginia.

The community lies at an elevation of 2,730 feet (832 m).

The ZIP Code for Helton is 28643.

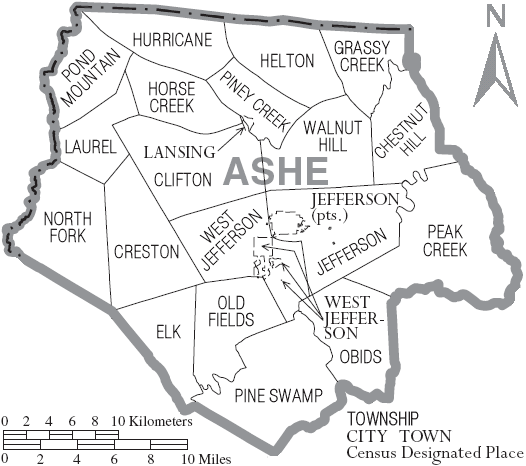
Map of Ashe County with municipal and township labels

== Climate ==
The USDA hardiness zone for Helton is Zone 7A (0 °F to 5 °F or -18 °C to -15 °C).

== History ==
The Baptist Chapel Church and Cemetery was listed on the National Register of Historic Places in 1976.

== Notable person ==
- Monte Weaver, baseball pitcher during the 1930s
