= Chestnut Hill, Henderson County, North Carolina =

Unincorporated community in North Carolina, US

Coordinates: 35°28′29″N 82°20′33″W

Chestnut Hill is an unincorporated community in Henderson County, North Carolina, United States. It lies at an elevation of 2,667 feet (813 m). The community is part of the Asheville Metropolitan Statistical Area.
