= Chestnut Hill, Ashe County, North Carolina =

Unincorporated community in North Carolina, US

Coordinates: 36°30′19″N 81°21′08″W

Chestnut Hill is an unincorporated community in Ashe County, North Carolina, United States, located south of Crumpler. It lies at an elevation of 2,756 feet (840 m).
