= Jefferson Township, Ashe County, North Carolina =

Township in Ashe County, North Carolina

Coordinates: 36.4307655°N 81.4223593°W

Jefferson Township
- Township
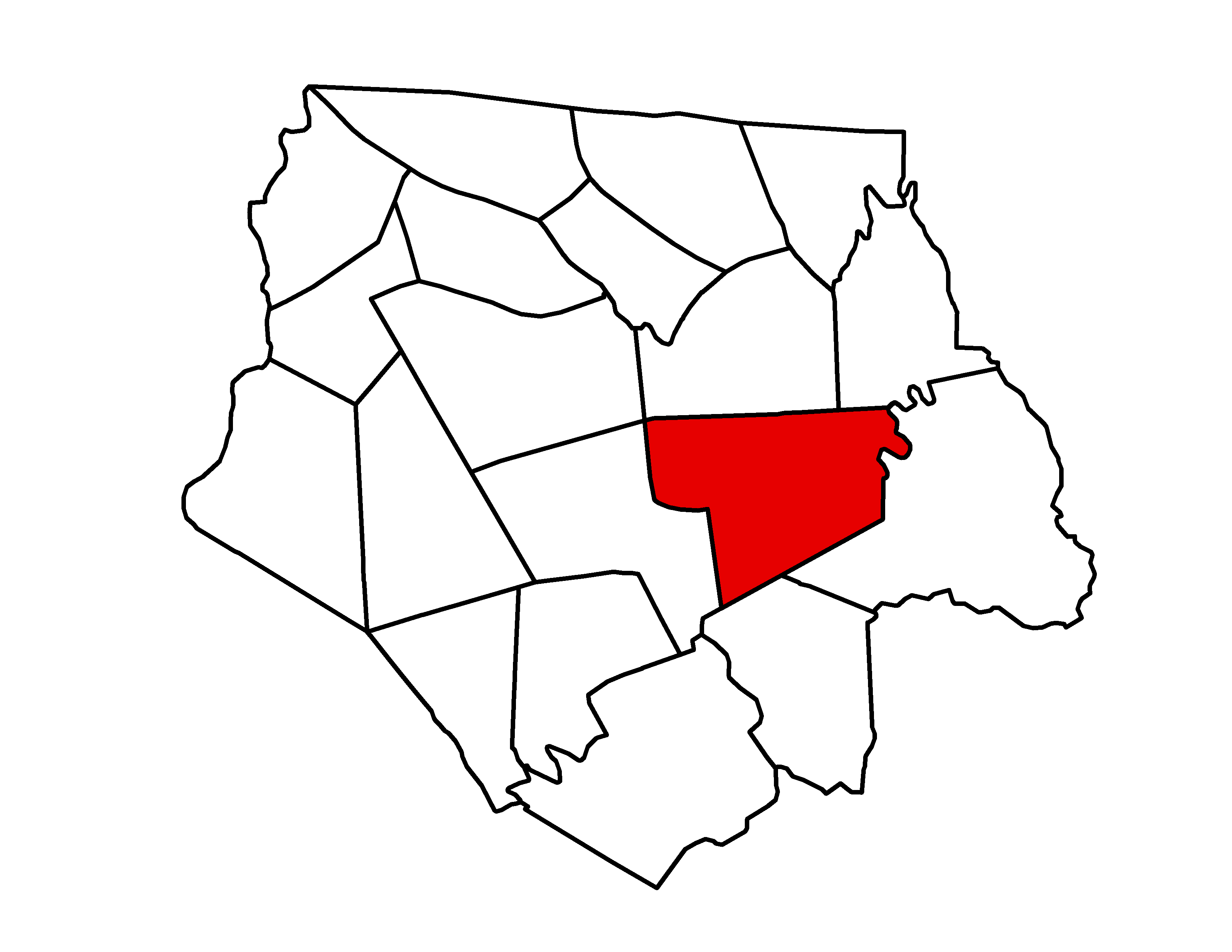
- Location of Jefferson Township within Ashe County

- Location of Ashe County within North Carolina
- Country: United States
- State: North Carolina
- County: Ashe

Area
  - Total: 32.6 sq mi (84 km^{2})

Population (2020)
  - Total: 4,736
- Time zone: UTC-5 (EST)
  - Summer (DST): UTC-4 (EDT)
- Area codes: 336, 743

Jefferson Township is a township in Ashe County, North Carolina, United States.

== Geography and population ==
Jefferson Township is one of 19 townships within Ashe County. It is 32.6 square miles [ 84 km^{2} ] in total area. The township is located in central Ashe County.

In 2020, the township had a population of 4,736. Jefferson Township is the largest township in Ashe County by population.

Communities within the township include Jefferson and portions of West Jefferson.
