= Creston (Macedonia) =

Creston or Kreston (Ancient Greek: Κρήστων), or Crestone or Krestone (Κρηστώνη), was a town of Crestonia in ancient Macedonia. The town is mentioned by Herodotus as being inhabited by Pelasgians who spoke a non-Greek language. The name is also preserved as Crestona or Krestona (Κρηστώνα).

Its site is unlocated.
