= Sturgills, North Carolina =

Unincorporated community in North Carolina, U.S.

Sturgills
- Unincorporated community
- Location within North Carolina
- Coordinates: 36.55°N 81.49°W
- Country: United States
- State: North Carolina
- County: Ashe
- Named for: Sheriff B. Sturgills
- Time zone: UTC-5 (EST)
  - Summer (DST): UTC-4 (EDT)
- ZIP Code: 28643
- Area codes: 336, 743

Sturgills is an unincorporated community in Ashe County, North Carolina, United States.

== Geography ==
Sturgills is located in northern Ashe County. The community borders the state of Virginia.

Sturgills is within the Helton Township in Ashe County.

The ZIP Code is 28643.

== History ==
Sturgills was named for former Ashe County Sheriff B. Sturgills, who was instrumental in the founding of the community's former post office (Powell 1968, p. 479).
