= Warrensville, North Carolina =

Unincorporated community in North Carolina, U.S.

Warrensville Buffalo Creek
- Unincorporated community
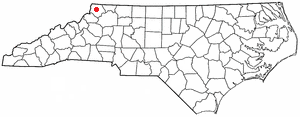
- Location within the U.S. state of North Carolina
- Coordinates: 36.46°N 81.51°W
- Country: United States
- State: North Carolina
- County: Ashe
- Elevation: 2,707 ft (825 m)

Population (2020)
  - Total: 1,425
- Time zone: UTC-5 (EST)
  - Summer (DST): UTC-4 (EDT)
- ZIP Code: 28693
- Area codes: 336, 743

Warrensville (formerly known as Buffalo Creek) is an unincorporated community in Ashe County, North Carolina, United States. The population was 1,425 at the 2020 census.

== Geography ==
Warrensville is located in north-central Ashe County, north of West Jefferson.

The community lies at an elevation of 2,707 feet (825 m).

Warrensville is within the Clifton Township in Ashe County.

The ZIP Code for Warrensville is 28693.

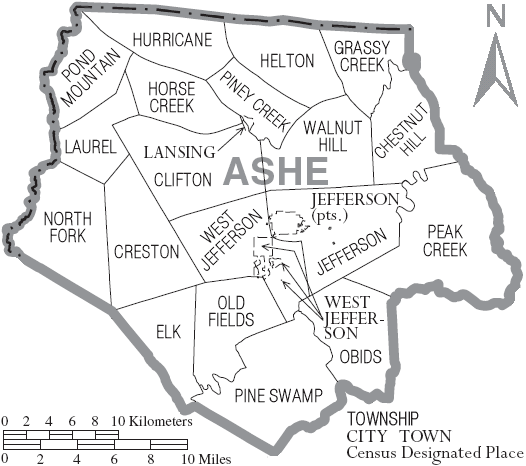
Map of Ashe County with municipal and township labels

== Demographics ==
=== 2020 census ===
Warrensville racial composition
Race	Number	Percentage
White (non-Hispanic)	1,317	91.14%
Black or African American (non-Hispanic)	8	0.55%
Native American	0	0%
Asian	3	0.21%
Pacific Islander	0	0%
Other/Mixed	40	2.77%
Hispanic or Latino	77	5.33%
