= Zuism =

Neopagan new religious movements

𒀭 Zuism الزوئية
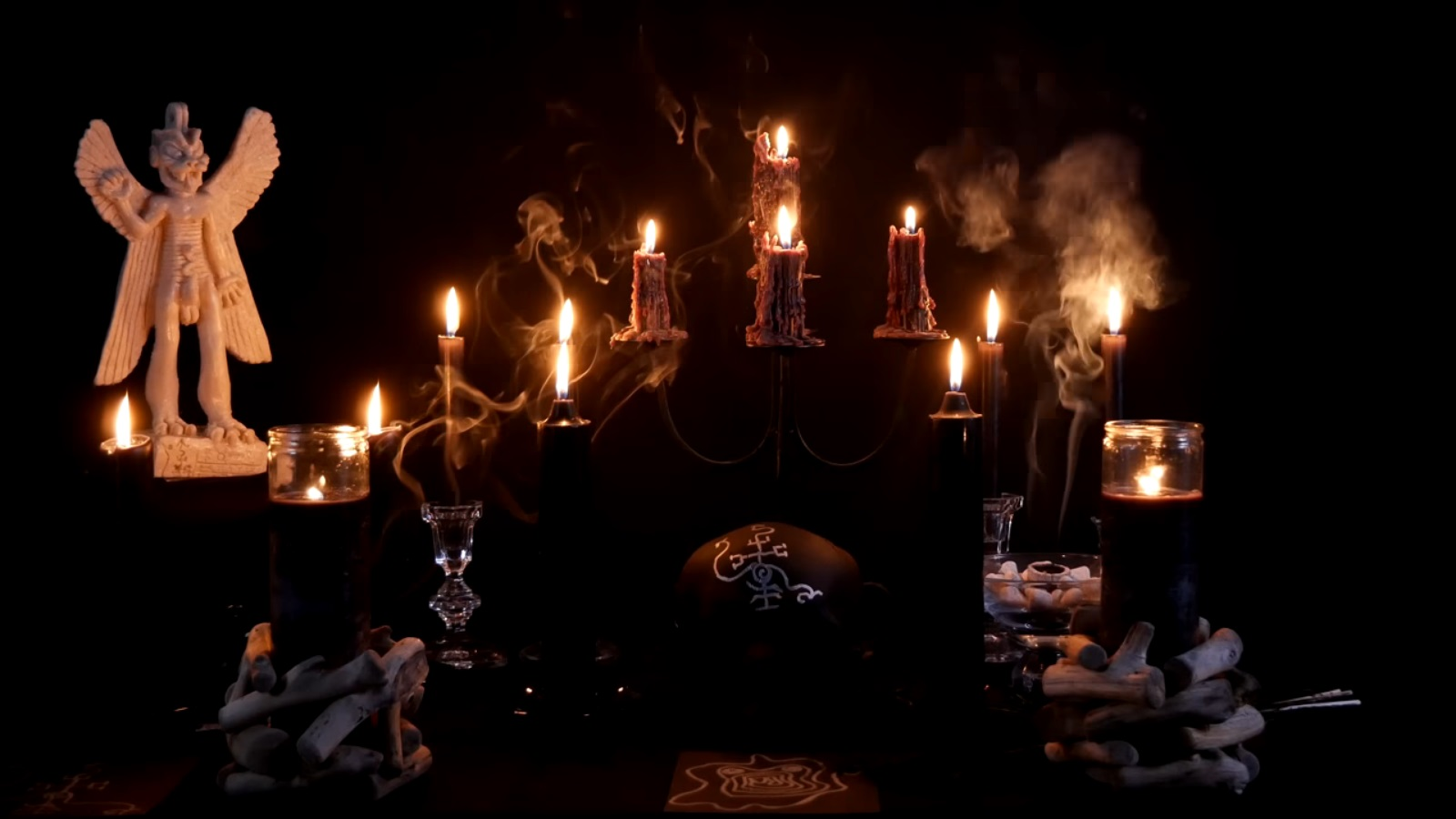
- A Zuist practitioner's altar dedicated to the Assyrian deity Pazuzu. The seals in the foreground at the centre of the altar are those of Humbaba below and Pazuzu himself above, drawn from the Simon Necronomicon.
- Type: Neopaganism
- Orientation: Sumerian-Mesopotamian, Semitic-Canaanite religions
- Associations: Hungarian Church (Magyar Egyház); Founding Church of Mardukite Zuism; Icelandic Faith Fellowship of Zuism (Zuism trúfélag); Assyrian Creed Founding Council
- Origin: 1960s-1970s (Hungarian Zuism), 1977-1980 (Gate-Walking rites), 2008 (Mardukite Zuism), 2010s (Icelandic Zuism)

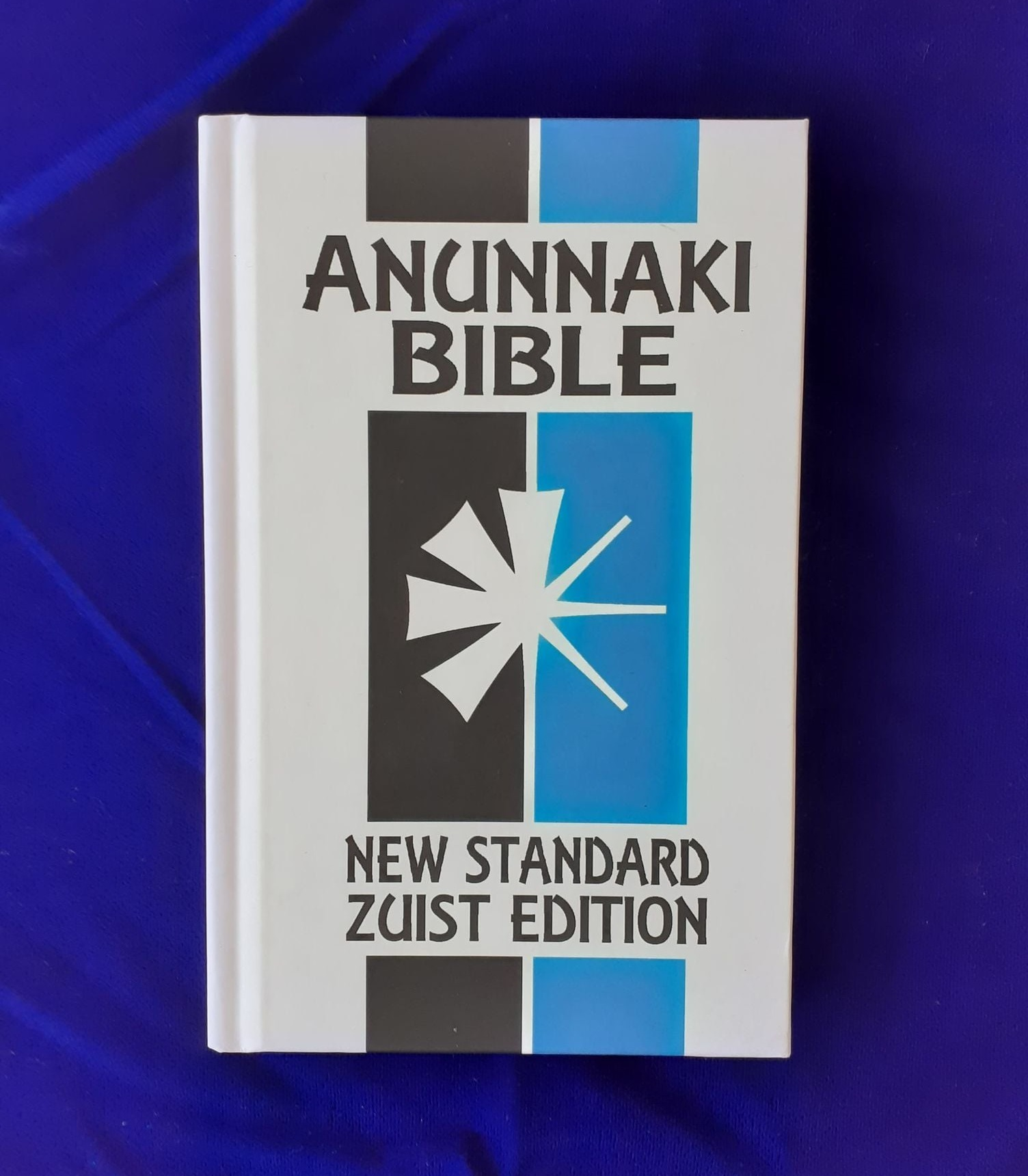
The Anunnaki Bible of Mardukite Zuism.

Zuism (Arabic: الزوئية al-Zuiyya; religious symbol: 𒀭), also known as Sumerian-Mesopotamian Neopaganism (Sumerian: 𒀭𒀀𒉣𒈾𒌣 Anunna Umun, "Knowledge of the Heavenly Principles") and Semitic-Canaanite Neopaganism (Ugaritic: 𐎐𐎚𐎁𐎟𐎖𐎄𐎌 Natib Qadish, "Holy Way"), or collectively as Middle Eastern Neopaganism, is a group of Neopagan new religious movements based upon ancient Sumerian-Mesopotamian and Semitic-Canaanite religions. There are Zuist groups across North America, Western Europe, Eastern Europe, Oceania, as well as the Middle East.

Early Zuist groups arose in Hungary and among the Hungarian diaspora in the 1960s and 1970s, especially in the wake of the work of the Assyriologist Ferenc Badiny Jós (1909–2007), who founded a Hungarian Zuist Church and was the author of the Magyar Bible of the Sumerian tradition. The publication of the Simon Necronomicon and its related books in the United States since the late 1970s, sparked the spread of the Mesopotamian-based "Gate-Walking" Zuist system of ceremonial magic. Mesopotamian Neopaganism was also cultivated by the American philosopher Joshua Free, who made his doctrines public from 2008 onwards under the denomination of "Mardukite Zuism". In Iceland, a local Zuist organisation, the Zuism trúfélag, officially recognised by the state between 2013 and 2025, was used to bypass the local tax on religious organisations and protest against the bonds between religion and the state.

== Etymology ==
The noun "Zuism" is derived from the Sumerian verb zu 𒍪 (idû in Akkadian), that means "to know", "to understand". "Zuism", therefore, means "Way of Knowledge", and the word was used for the first time by the American philosopher Joshua Free in the mid-2000s. The term is a semantic parallel of the Greek gnosis.

The movement is also known under the names of "Kaldanism", that is to say "Way of Chaldea" (a late name for Sumer), "Sumerian-Mesopotamian/Semitic-Canaanite Reconstructionism", Anunna Umun 𒀭𒀀𒉣𒈾𒌣, that is to say "Knowledge of the Heavenly Principles" in Sumerian, or Ntb Qdš (vocalised as Natib Qadish) 𐎐𐎚𐎁𐎟𐎖𐎄𐎌, that is to say "Holy Way" in Ugaritic, the language which was spoken in the ancient Canaanite city-state of Ugarit.

== Zuist movements ==
=== Hungarian Zuism ===
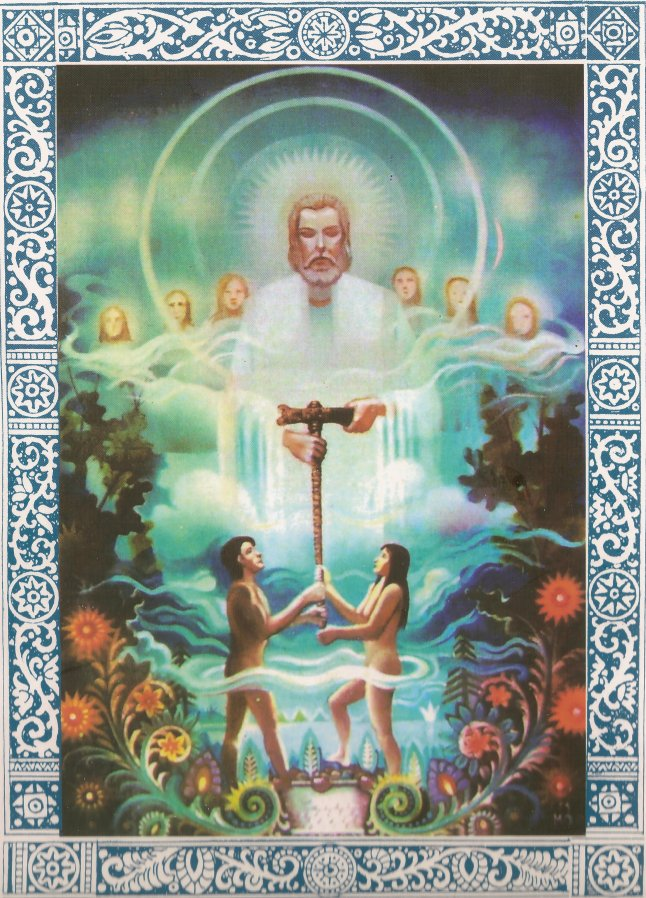
Illustration from the Magyar Bible of Hungarian Zuism, representing the seven Anunnaki providing mankind with the hoe, thus initiating them to the practice of agriculture.

The earliest organised Zuist movement was established by the Hungarian Assyriologist Ferenc Badiny Jós (1909–2007), together with the historian Ida Bobula (1900–1981) and other authors, including Tibor Baráth, Victor Padányi, and András Zakar, between the 1960s and the 1970s, among those Hungarians who sought to relate the origins of the Hungarians to the ancient Sumerians, especially based on the shared, common features of the Hungarian and Sumerian languages, notably agglutination.

Ferenc Badiny Jós, who emigrated to Buenos Aires, in Argentina, when Hungary became part of the Soviet sphere of influence, and after the latter's collapse returned to his home country, founded a "Hungarian Church" (Magyar Egyház) following the Sumerian tradition, the legacy of which continues to this day among Hungarian Zuists. An important bequest of Badiny Jós is his Magyar Bible of the Sumerian tradition. Among the Hungarian Zuist organisations that continue in the wake of Badiny Jós' teachings there are the "Hungarian Religious Fellowship" (Magyar Vallás Közössége) and the "Old Hungarian Church" (Ősmagyar Egyház). Another Hungarian Zuist group that follows Sumerian traditions is the "Bolyanest".

Hungarian Zuists interpret Hungarian runes and symbols as deriving from Sumerian cuneiform, the Turul bird of Hungarian mythology as being the same as the Sumerian Anzû, and they equate the Hungarian term Isten ("God") with the Akkadian Isten ("One"), as well as the Siberian Tengri ("God-Heaven") — the Hungarians and the Sumerians are considered within these circles, which espouse Turanist ideas, to have remoter Siberian origins — with the Sumerian Dingir–An ("God-Heaven"; Akkadian Ilu). The Lebanese cedar, a holy tree in ancient Middle Eastern religious cultures, is revered as a means of connection with the divine by Hungarian Zuists; during the solstices and equinoxes, they gather near cedars and light candles, offer libations, dance around the trees while singing and reciting prayers to the Sumerian gods.

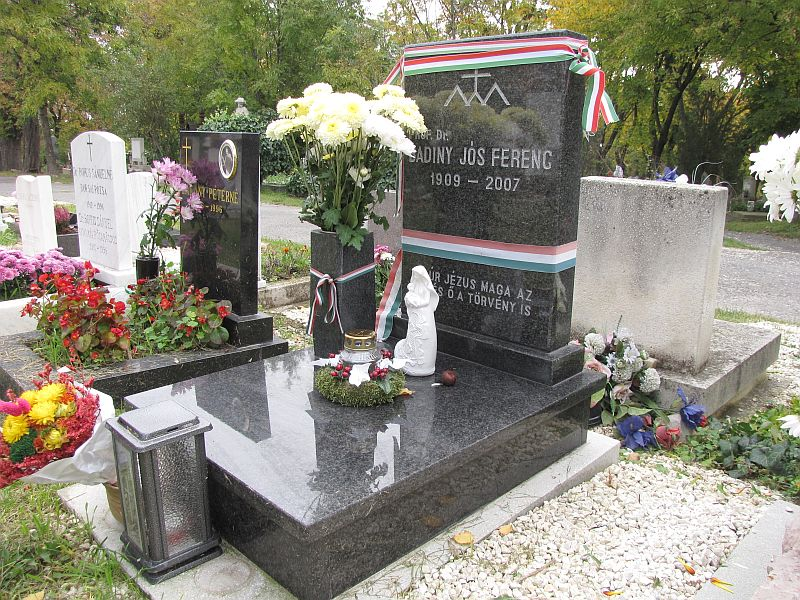
The grave (942/2-1-105) of Ferenc Badiny Jós at the Farkasrét Cemetery in Budapest, Hungary. Carven onto the tombstone is the symbol of the Hungarian Zuist Church.

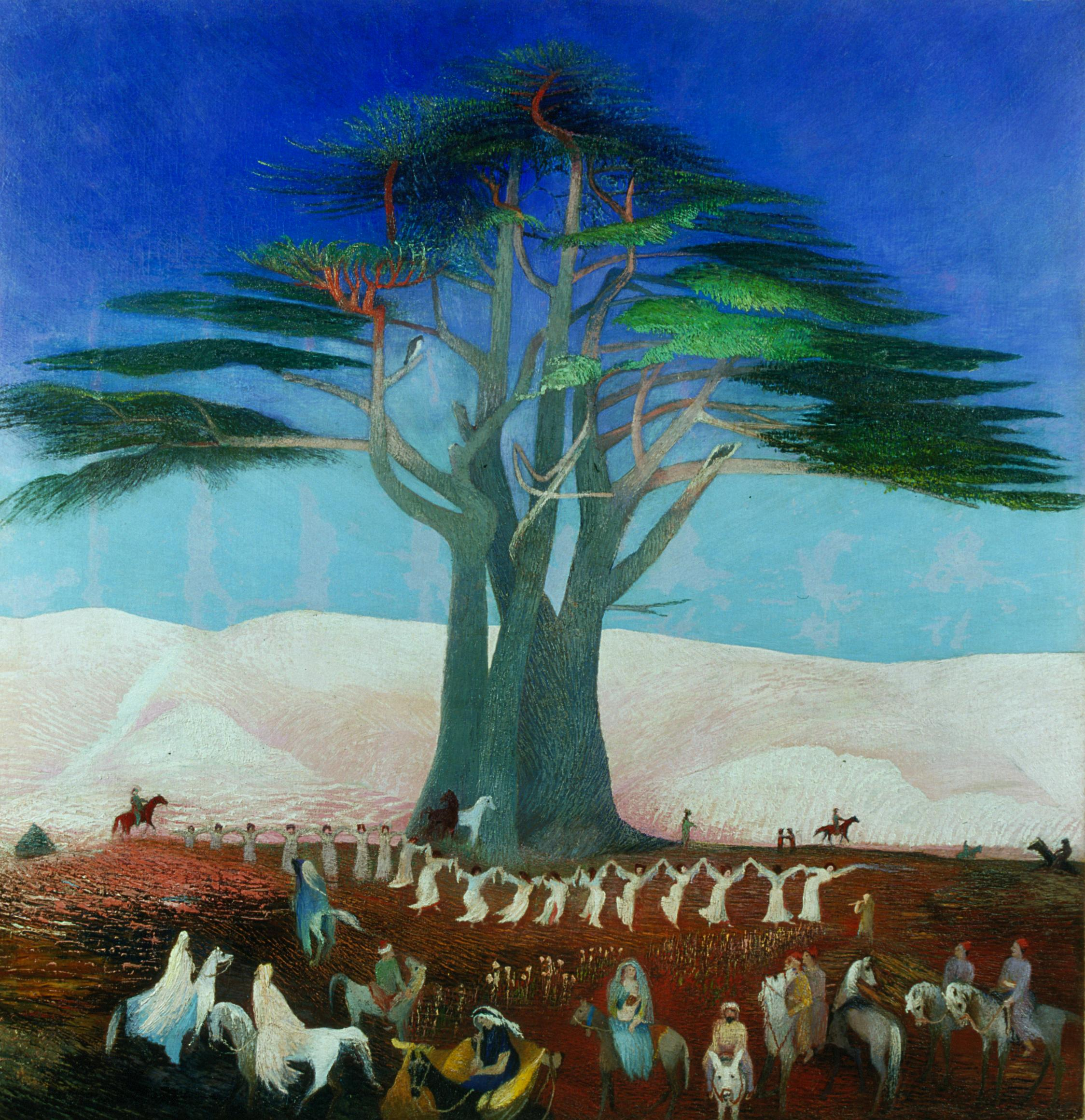
Pilgrimage to the Cedars in Lebanon (1907) by Tivadar Csontváry Kosztka. Some Hungarian Zuists make pilgrimages and perform rites at a giant Lebanese cedar on the edge of a forest in the mountains surrounding Budapest.

=== Mardukite Zuism ===
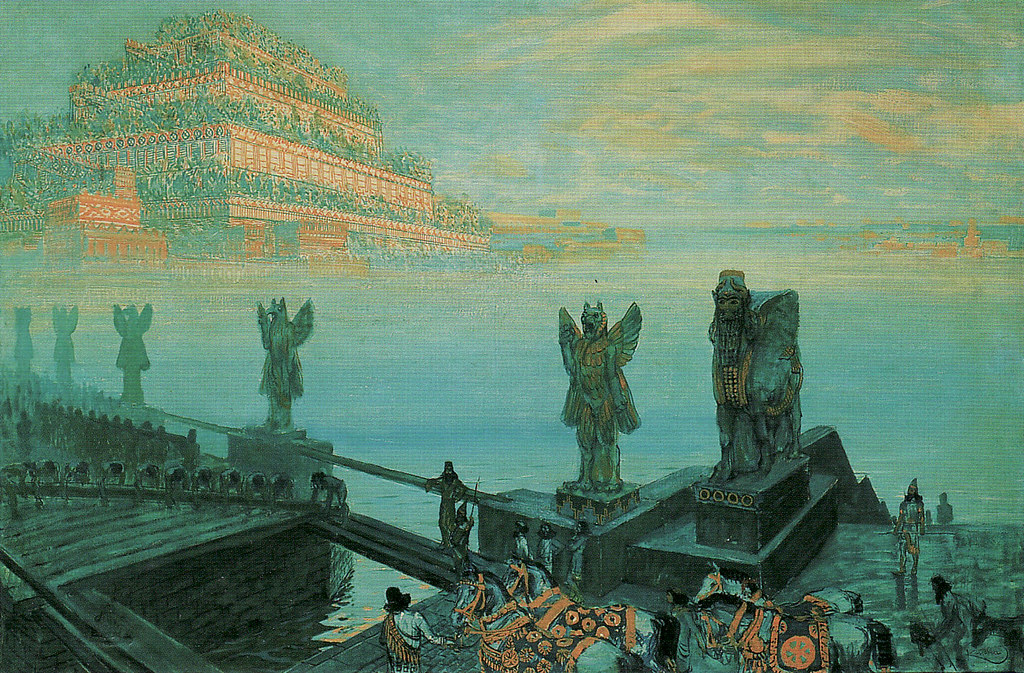
Babylon (1906) by František Kupka. Mardukite Zuism takes inspiration from the Babylonian phase of ancient Mesopotamian religion.

Mardukite Zuism is a Zuist doctrine established by the American mystical and esoteric philosopher Joshua Free in 2008 and incorporated by the "Founding Church of Mardukite Zuism". Mardukite Zuism harkens back to the later Akkadian-Babylonian tradition, rather than the earlier Sumerian tradition.

The religious books of the Mardukite Zuist movement comprise the Anunnaki Bible and other texts of the "New Standard Zuist Edition", The Power of Zu, the Mardukite Necronomicon, and the numerous other writings about theory and practice by the same author, Joshua Free. The latter defines Zuism as a "systemology" and "spiritual technology" for the realisation of oneself, that is to say the reunification of the self with God, and, beside "knowledge" and "understanding", he also gives to the concept of zu the meanings of "consciousness" and "awareness", and interprets it as the radiant energy that permeates all living beings.

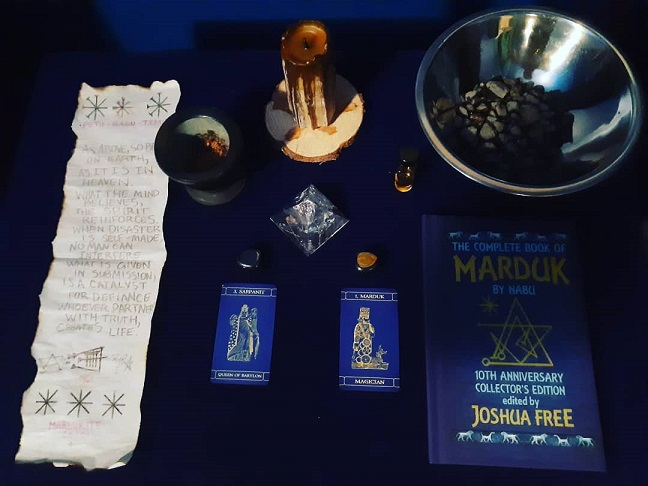
Altar belonging to a Canadian practitioner of Mardukite Zuism. On the cover of the Book of Marduk, there is a Zuist version of the merkabah ("chariot"), the means of connection with the seven Anunnaki, the supreme trinity (An/Ilu, Enlil/Bel, Enki/Ea), and the transcendent One.

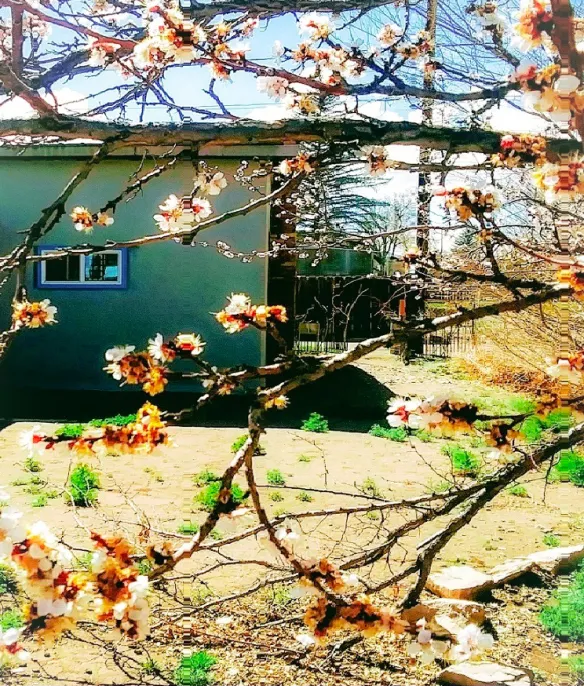
Blossoms of apricot tree at the Borsippa Headquarters of the Mardukite Zuist Church in Monte Vista, Colorado, United States.

=== Iraqi Zuism ===
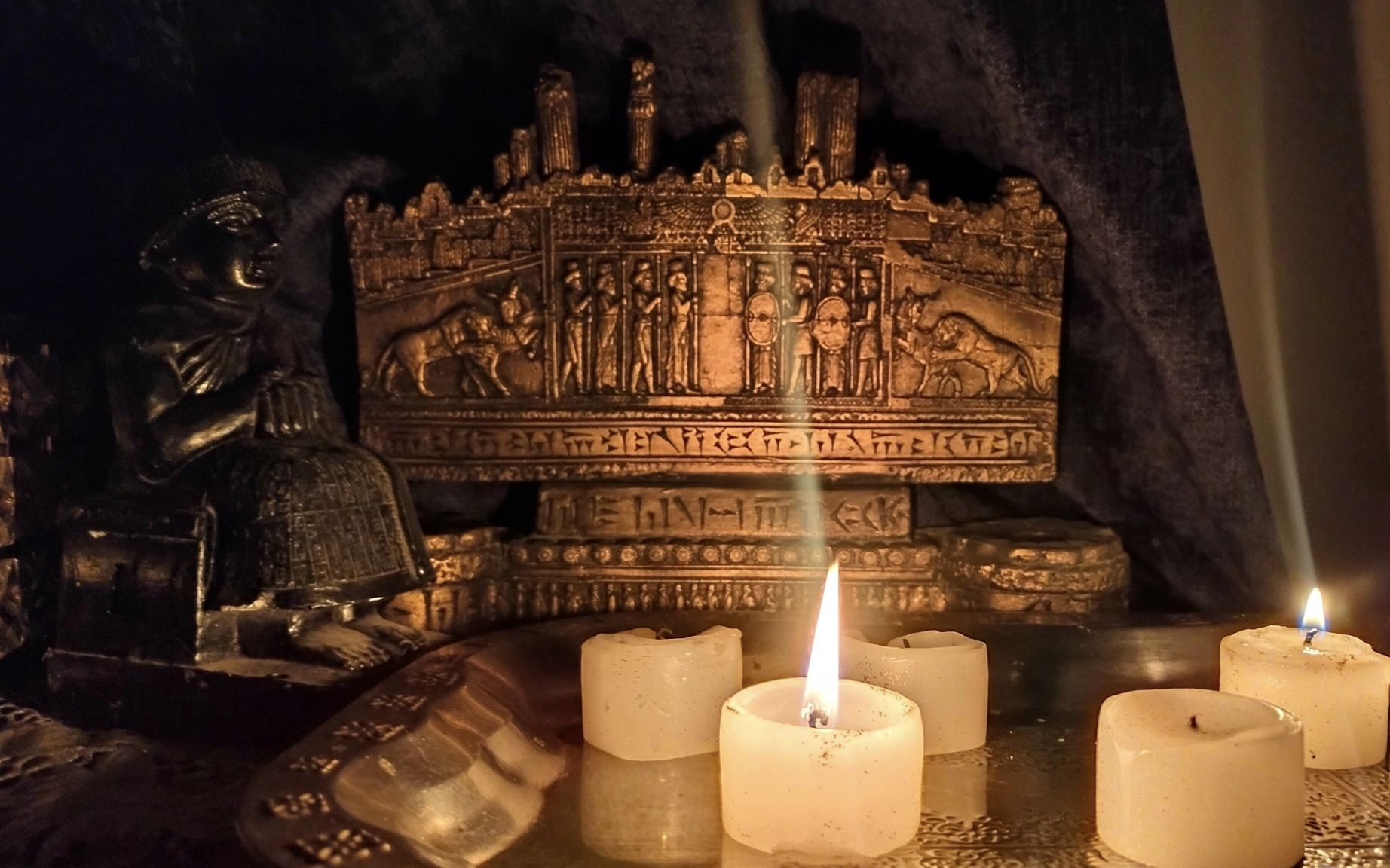
Private altar dedicated to Gudea and other divine figures, by a Zuist practitioner from Nasiriyah, Iraq.

The Russian Assyriologist V. V. Yemelyanov documented the rise of a Zuist movement in Iraq at the beginning of the 2010s, with the dissemination of prayers to the Mesopotamian gods in the Arabic language.

Among the Assyrian-speaking people and their diaspora across the world, there is a distinct Akkadian-Assyrian Zuist movement, also known as "Ashurism", that focuses on Ashur as the utmost god above An, incorporated since 2023 in Australia by the "Assyrian Creed Founding Council" of the "Zuist Church of Australia".

=== Canaanite Zuism ===
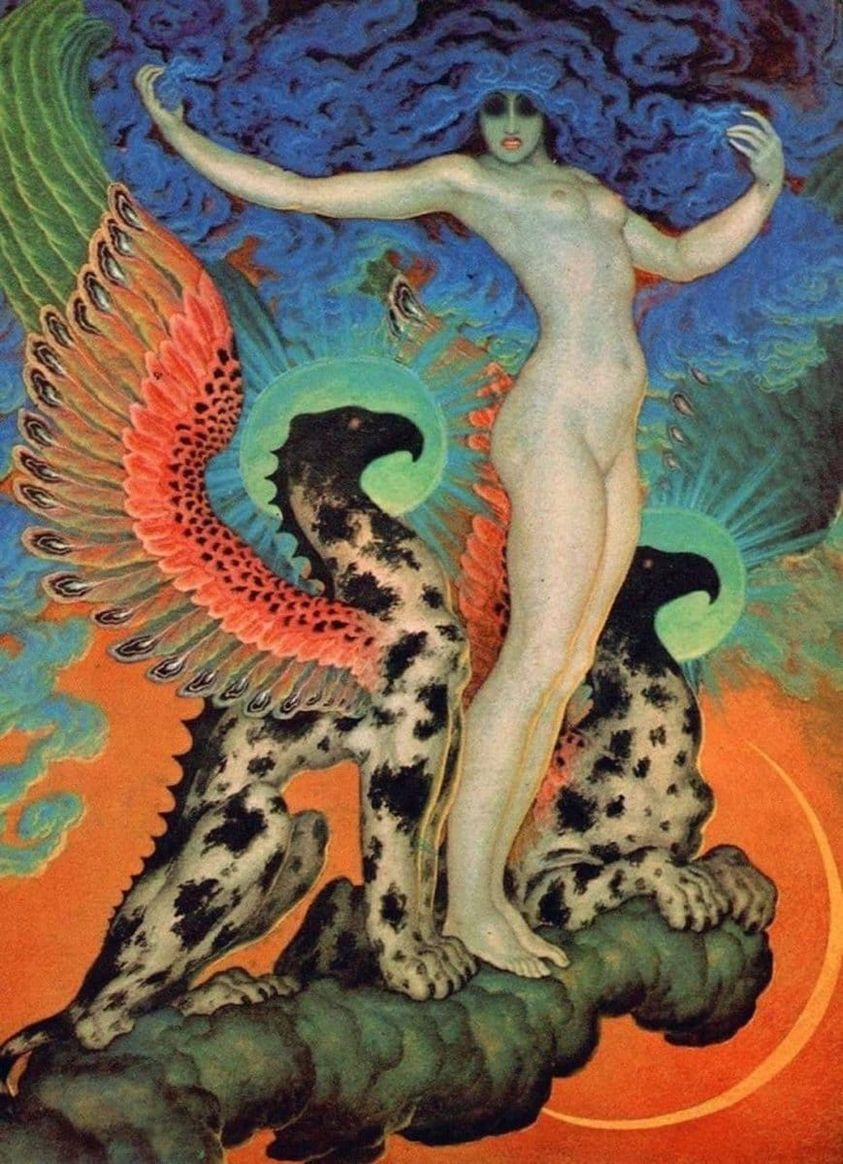
Astarte (1926) by Nicholas Kalmakoff, representing the Canaanite goddess equivalent, in both function and name etymology, of the Mesopotamian goddess Ishtar.

Flag of Ratosh's Young Hebrews' movement. The flag features the traditional Canaanite colours tekhelet (light blue) and argaman (purple), and the golden symbol in the centre is a stylised version of the Semitic first letter aleph (𐤀) in the ancient Hebrew script, representing both the horns of a bull and the rising sun.

Canaanite Zuism, or Levantine Zuism, constitutes a small community in the region of the Levant (Canaan), most notably in Israel, trying to revive the ancient Canaanite religion. It has antecedents in the cultural and literary movement of Canaanism among the Jews of British Palestine during the 1940s. Fostered by the discovery of the site of Ugarit in 1928, which demonstrated the common origins of ancient Canaanite and Isralite cultures, Canaanism, whose members took inspiration from Canaanite mythology for their productions, sought to forge a new shared, and religiously non-Jewish, "Hebrew" ethnic identity for both Jews and other peoples residing in British Palestine, and later in the newly established state of Israel.

The founding ideologue of Canaanism was the poet and journalist Yonatan Ratosh (1908–1981), who was born under the name of Uriel Heilperin in Warsaw, Poland, and changed his surname to Shelach upon settling in British Palestine. Between 1942 and 1943, Ratosh founded the "Committee for the Consolidation of the Hebrew Youth", consisting at first of a dozen intellectuals and artists, followed in 1951 by a public group named the "Centre for Young Hebrews". Although thenceforth Canaanism rapidly declined, the thought and literary production of its members have a lasting influence among Israeli Zuists. Another influence for Canaanite Zuists is the Hungarian Jewish historian and anthropologist Raphael Patai (1910−1996), particularly his book The Hebrew Goddess.

The Canaanite Zuist movement is also known as Natib Qadish, an expression in the Ugaritic language that means "Holy Way" and was first used by the American practitioner Tess Dawson at the beginning of the 2000s. Dawson established a theoretical and practical framework for the movement, mostly based upon the Ugaritic texts and the Gezer calendar, which is often used by Canaanite Zuists, either in whole or in part. In Dawson's terminology, followers are sometimes called Qadish in the singular and Qadishuma in the plural, and the priests, male and female, are called respectively kahin and kahinat.

In order to integrate their beliefs and practices, Canaanite Zuists also take inspiration from Mesopotamian and Western esoteric and ritual models (such as Sumerian-Akkadian divine hierarchies and Wiccanate ritual systems), and also ancient Hebrew traditions (the Hebrew calendar and the liturgical use of ancient forms of the Hebrew language). They celebrate eight yearly festivals, most of which occur near the equinoxes, solstices, full moons, and new moons.

In the early 2010s, the Israeli Zuist adherent Elad Aaron formulated a cultural and political ideology called "Re-Zionist [Shni-Tzioni] New Canaanism", which includes the rediscovery of the ancient Canaanite religion, interpreted as theologically pandeistic, and distinguishes itself from Ratosh's earlier Canaanism by being aimed at Jews alone, and not at other peoples of the Levant. Aaron published two manifestos, namely The Hidden Hebrew and the Visible Hebrew (2012) and Hear Our Call: The Re-Zionist Manifesto (2013, co-authored by Ya'akov Hevroni), to detail his views.

=== Icelandic Zuism ===
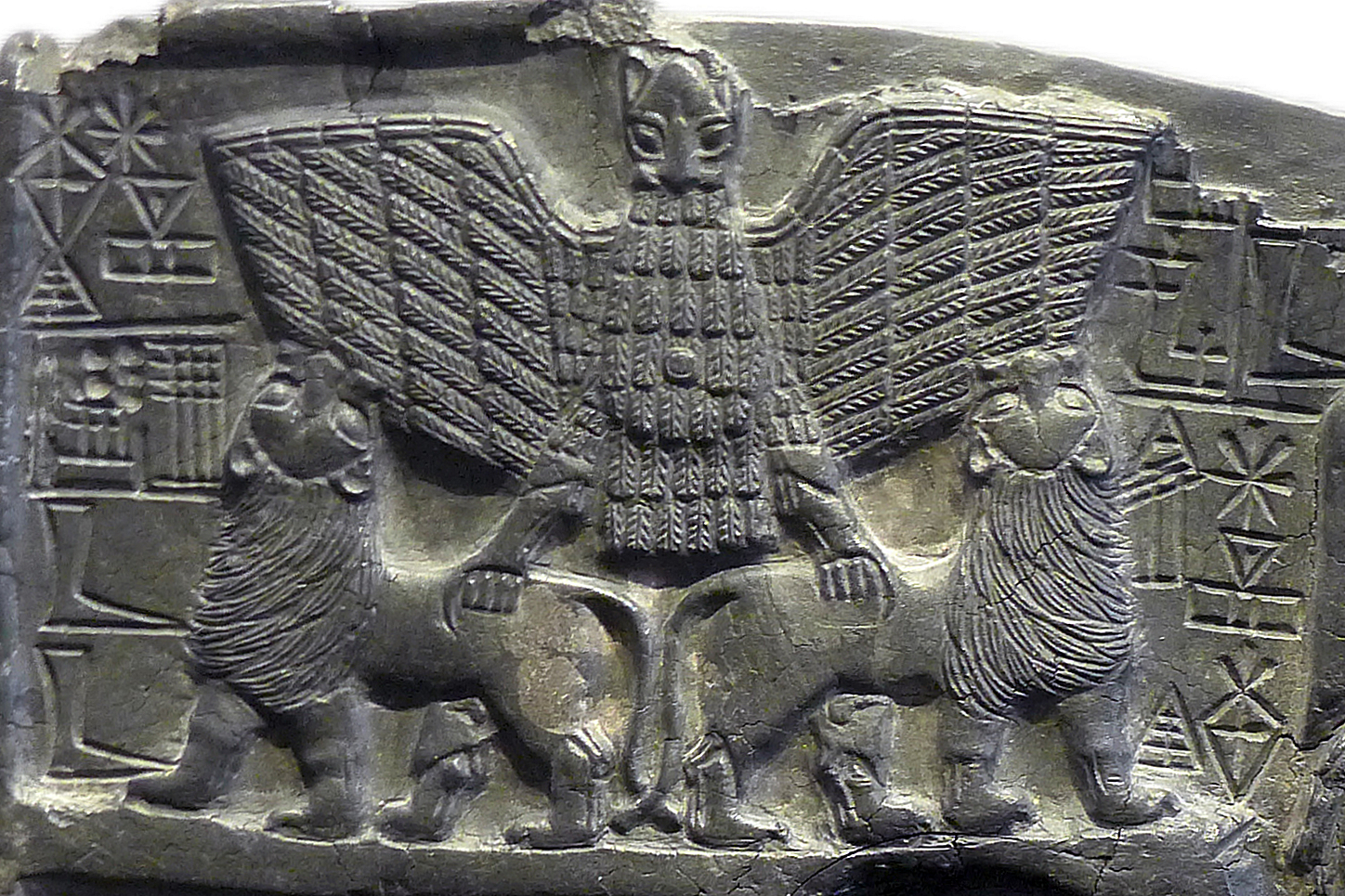
Bas-relief depicting Anzû, the "Heavenly Eagle", main divine patron of the ancient Mesopotamian city of Lagash. The Icelandic Zuist movement was at first also associated with this figure by the press.

The "Faith Fellowship of Zuism" (Zuism trúfélag) of the Sumerian tradition was established in Iceland in 2010 by Ólafur Helgi Þorgrímsson (who left it shortly afterwards) and the two brothers Ágúst Arnar and Einar Ágústsson, originally as a branch of a mother church located in the state of Delaware, in the United States, and was registered by the Icelandic state in 2013.

In Iceland, all citizens, on a yearly basis and regardless of whether they are believers or not, have to pay a tax on religion, the sóknargjald, which is then allocated by the government to religious organisations in proportion to the number of their followers. In 2015, some people, disapproving of such a system, and under the leadership of Ísak Andri Ólafsson, took control of the Zuist organisation with the aim of using it as a tool for tax resistance: in their plan, the portion of the religion tax allocated to the movement by the government was to be redistributed to each of the followers, who would thus find a way to bypass the system.

The Zuism trúfélag of Ísak Andri Ólafsson intended to fight against not only the imposition of the religion tax, but also the maintenance of the Icelandic national registry of the citizens' religious affiliations. This protest was part of a broader movement within the Icelandic population in those years asking for a complete separation of church and state, to such an extent that even some well-known politicians, including Birgitta Jónsdóttir, joined the organisation. Given that the Zuism trúfélag was used for clearly stated tax purposes and not for religious reasons, some Icelandic elected officials requested its removal from Iceland's national registry of recognised religions. Nevertheless, a spokesperson of the Zuism trúfélag answered to such a request by claiming that one can neither precisely define the religious nature of an organisation nor measure the sincerity of the religious belief of people.

As of 1 January 2015, the Zuism trúfélag had only four registered adherents, but their number grew very rapidly over a few weeks at the end of 2015, reaching 3,000 to 3,500 followers, or 1% of the Icelandic population in 2015–2016. The majority of the followers were young, connected to the Internet, and already disaffiliated from Christianity (then Iceland's major religion). After a legal struggle for the leadership of the organisation, in 2017 the Ágústsson brothers regained control of it. In 2020 the leaders of the organisation, still the Ágústsson brothers, were accused of tax fraud and embezzlement; they were later acquitted of all charges in 2022, but were indicted again and convicted in 2025.

Logos of the Icelandic Zuism trúfélag over the years

2010–2015

2015–2017

2017–2025

== Gate-Walking rituals ==
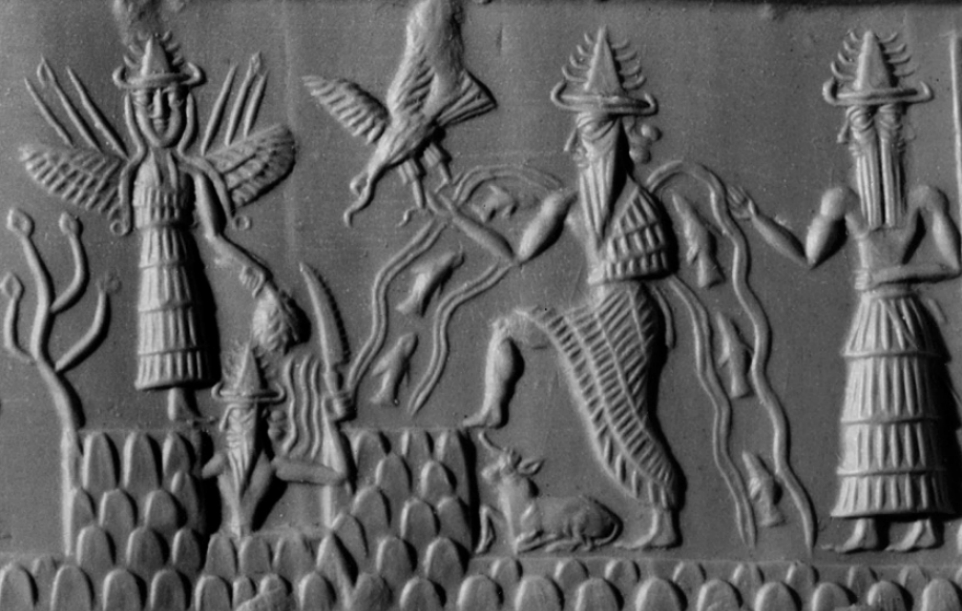
From left to right, on an Akkadian cylinder seal from Sippar: two of the seven Anunnaki, namely Inanna/Ishtar and Utu/Shamash, then Enki/Ea of the supreme trinity, and his sukkal Isimud/Usimu.

In Zuist thought, the seven Anunnaki are energetic currents, or "rays", each of which vibrates a tone and colour of the universal manifestation, whereby they engender all things and phenomena within spatio-temporal stations and spheres of existence (zonei, to use a Greek-based term from the Simon Necronomicon), and they themselves take physicalised forms that include celestial, astral bodies — the seven fixed stars of the north pole and the seven wandering planets —, and even earthly, human-like bodies. The seven rays are begotten within sensory reality by the supreme trinity — An/Ilu, which splits into Enlil/Bel and Enki/Ea —, also known as the "three rays of unity" and located beyond sensory reality, which in turn are the threefold manifestation of the absolute, transcendent One.

The "Gate-Walking" ritual tradition, used by groups of different denominations within the movement, is a Zuist system of ceremonial magic that consists in the crossing of the "gates" between the stations and spheres of existence governed by the seven Anunnaki, by connecting with the latter and co-working with their powers, thus expanding one's perception, awareness, and perfecting one's own being, in order to ascend the levels of the ladder of existence and establish and maintain communication with the supreme trinity and ultimately with the transcendent One. The merkabah ("chariot") is the vehicle that appears, and is ridden, when thresholds are crossed and energetic exchanges are established between different planes of reality.

The Gate-Walking system began to spread with the publication of the Simon Necronomicon and its ancillary books in the United States in 1977–1980 and afterwards. Published under the pseudonym "Simon", the books were allegedly written by a collective of authors ("Schlangekraft") belonging to the occult Hermetic organisation Ordo Templi Orientis, although they are also attributed to the American esoteric author Peter Levenda, who also happens to be their copyright holder. Most of the content is drawn from Mesopotamian poems, including the Enuma Elish and the Descent of Inanna into the Underworld, although it is adapted to fit the narrative about the fictional Necronomicon from H. P. Lovecraft's stories and the latter's peculiar aesthetics.

In 2009, Joshua Free, the founder of the Mardukite denomination of Zuism, published the first editions of the Mardukite Necronomicon, purged of Lovecraftian influences and relying more philologically on Mesopotamian sources, while Mardukite commentaries on the Simon Necronomicon are collected under the title Novem Portis, first published in 2012.

== Holy places ==
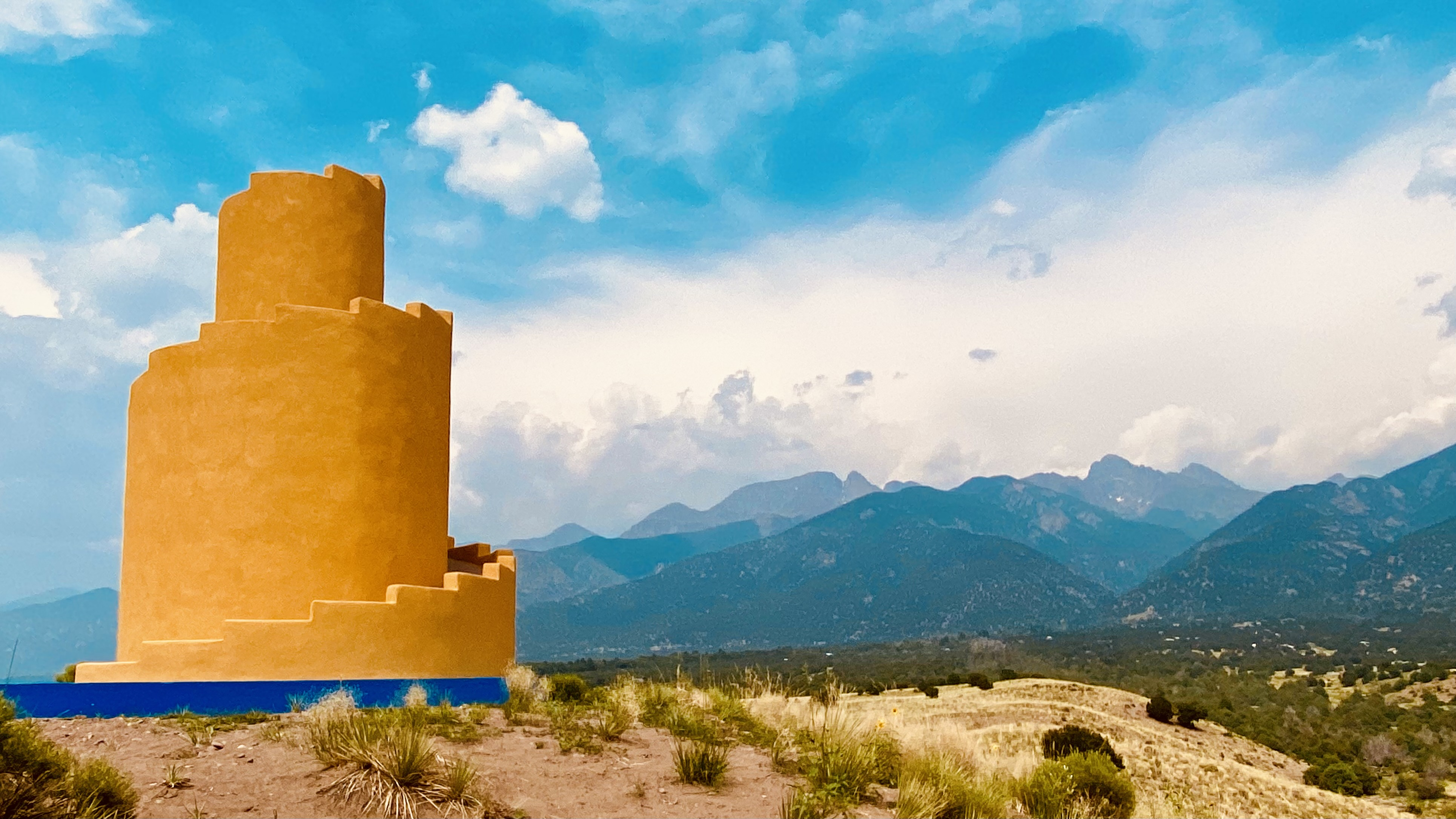
The Crestone Ziggurat in Crestone, Colorado, United States, used as a spiritual centre by American Zuists.

The Church of Mardukite Zuism has designated an area in the San Luis Valley of Colorado, in the United States, as "Mardukite Babylonia", where it has established the "Babylon-Eridu Headquarters" near Mosca, named after the ancient Mesopotamian holy cities of the gods Marduk and Enki, and the "Borsippa Headquarters" near Monte Vista, named after the ancient holy city of the god Nabu, following the same principles of sacred geography as those of the ancient cities (with Borsippa located eleven miles southwest of Babylon).

The northernmost holy site in Mardukite Babylonia is the Crestone Ziggurat, built in 1978 by the American businessman Najeeb Halaby, father of Queen Noor of Jordan, as a place for prayer and meditation, a modern interpretation of the ancient Mesopotamian "stairways to Heaven", linking Heaven and Earth; the ziggurat (from Akkadian ziqqurratum, Sumerian unir, meaning "mountain peak, temple mount, and temple tower") is thus used by American Zuists and others as a spiritual centre.

Hungarian Zuists consider certain places marked by the presence of Lebanese cedar trees in the mountains and forests around Budapest to be sacred, and they make pilgrimages and perform rites there. In 2018, Icelandic Zuists applied for the allocation of a piece of land in Reykjavík on which to build a ziggurat-type temple, intended to replicate the Ekur ("Mountain House") of Enlil of the ancient Mesopotamian holy city of Nippur, but the project was ultimately cancelled due to the problems which the Icelandic Zuist organisation ran into.

== Bibliography ==
=== Zuist literature ===
Hungarian Zuist tradition

- Badiny Jós, Ferenc (1985–2005). Magyar Biblia [Magyar Bible] (in Hungarian). There are two versions of the Magyar Bible, the shorter "Quilmes (Buenos Aires) version" first published in 1985 under the title Káldeusok írása szerinti Magyar Biblia (The Magyar Bible as written by the Chaldeans), later republished in 1998, and the longer "Budapest version" published in 2005 (simply titled Magyar Biblia).
  - Badiny Jós, Ferenc (1985). Káldeusok irása szerinti Magyar Biblia [The Magyar Bible as written by the Chaldeans] (PDF) (in Hungarian). Quilmes, Argentina: Magyar Biblia Munkaközösség. Archived (PDF) from the original on 24 October 2018. 48 pp.
    - Badiny Jós, Ferenc (1998). Magyar Biblia [Magyar Bible] (in Hungarian). Budapest, Hungary: Orient Press. 72 pp.
  - Badiny Jós, Ferenc (2005). Magyar Biblia [Magyar Bible] (in Hungarian). Budapest, Hungary: Artamondo. ISBN 9637317066. 93 pp.
- Bobula, Ida (1953). "The Great Stag: A Sumerian Divinity and Its Affiliations". Anales de historia antigua y medieval (4). Buenos Aires, Argentina: University of Buenos Aires: 119–126. ISSN 0402-3277.

Mardukite Zuist tradition

- Free, Joshua; Kaos, Kyra (2019). Mardukite Zuism: A Brief Introduction (PDF). ISBN 978-1671768604. Archived (PDF) from the original on 25 July 2020.
- Free, Joshua (2020). Anunnaki Bible: The Cuneiform Scriptures. New Standard Zuist Edition. ISBN 978-0578733555.
- Free, Joshua (2022). Anunnaki Rites: The Maqlu Ritual Book. New Standard Zuist Edition. ISBN 979-8986437934. Liber-M.
  - Free, Joshua (2019). The Maqlu Ritual Book: Prayers, Exorcisms and Banishings. ISBN 978-0578481333. Liber-M.
- Free, Joshua (2022). Anunnaki Gods: The Sumerian Religion. New Standard Zuist Edition. ISBN 979-8986437941. Liber-50.
  - Free, Joshua (2021). Sumerian Religion: Introducing the Anunnaki Gods of Mesopotamian Neopaganism. ISBN 978-0578855165. Liber-50.
- Free, Joshua (2023). Anunnaki History: The Magic of Babylon. New Standard Zuist Edition. ISBN 978-1961509016. Liber-51.
- Free, Joshua (2023). Anunnaki Origins: The Epic of Creation. New Standard Zuist Edition. ISBN 978-1961509023. Liber-E.
  - Free, Joshua; Zibert, David (2021). Babylonian Myth and Magic: Spiritual Traditions and Mysticism in Mesopotamian Anunnaki Religion. ISBN 978-0578944159. Liber-51+E.
- Free, Joshua (2023). What Is Mardukite Zuism?: The Power of Zu. New Standard Zuist Edition. ISBN 978-1961509030. Liber-S1Z.
  - Free, Joshua; Penn, Reed (2021). The Power of Zu: Applying Mardukite Zuism and Systemology to Everyday Life. ISBN 978-0578924458. Liber-SZ1.
- Free, Joshua (2024). Anunnaki Prayers: The Cuneiform Almanac. New Standard Zuist Edition. ISBN 978-1961509443. Liber-W.
  - Free, Joshua (2019). The Complete Book of Marduk by Nabu. ISBN 978-0578470320. Liber-W.
- Free, Joshua (2025). Anunnaki Wisdom: The Tablet of Destinies. New Standard Zuist Edition. ISBN 978-1961509658. Liber-One.
  - Free, Joshua; Penn, Reed (2022). The Tablets of Destiny Revelation: How Long-Lost Anunnaki Wisdom Can Change the Fate of Humanity. ISBN 979-8986437972. Liber-One.
- Free, Joshua; Kaos, Kyra (2025). Anunnaki Priestess: Inside a Babylonian Temple. New Standard Zuist Edition. ISBN 978-1961509672. Liber-P1.
  - Free, Joshua; Kaos, Kyra (2025). Priestess of Babylon: An Account of Ancient Mesopotamian Religion from a Modern-Day Practitioner. ISBN 978-1961509665. Liber-P1.
- Free, Joshua (2022). Anunnaki Tarot: The Babylonian Oracle. ISBN 979-8218003289. Liber-T.
- Free, Joshua (2022). Mesopotamian Tradition: Academy Lectures. ISBN 979-8986437910.
- Free, Joshua; Penn, Reed (2023). Mardukite Zuism (The Power of Zu): Academy Lectures. ISBN 978-1961509047.

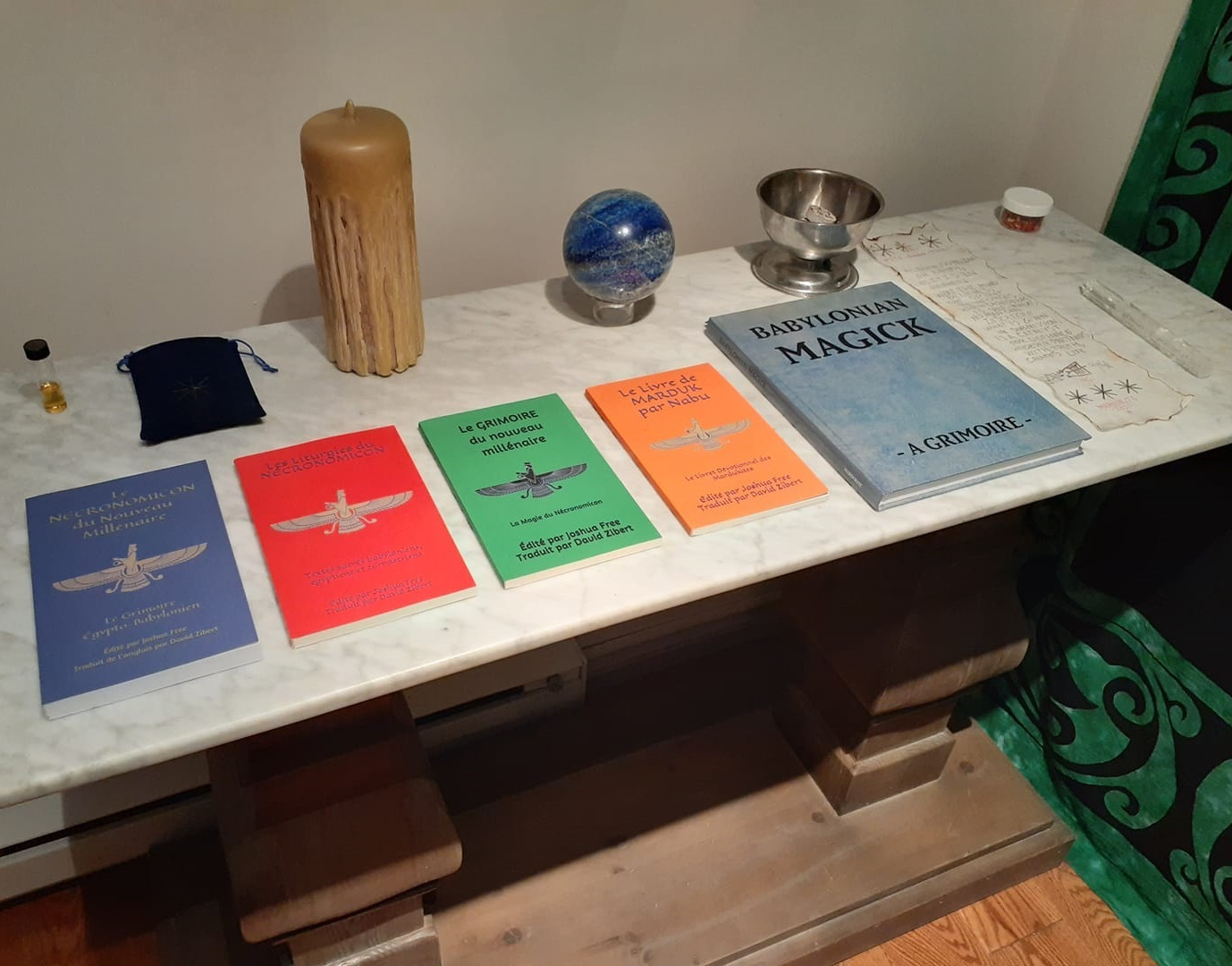
Mardukite Zuist altar with some books of the movement: the French edition of the tomes of the Mardukite Necronomicon, the Book of Marduk, and Babylonian Magick, written by Joshua Free.

Necronomicon Gate-Walking Zuist tradition

- Levenda, Peter (Simon) (1977–1980). Simon Necronomicon. ISBN 978-0380751921.
- Levenda, Peter (Simon) (1998). Necronomicon Spellbook. ISBN 978-0380731121.
- Levenda, Peter (Simon) (2006). The Gates of the Necronomicon. ISBN 978-0060890063.
- Levenda, Peter (Simon) (2006). Dead Names: The Dark History of the Necronomicon. ISBN 978-0060787042.
- Levenda, Peter (Simon) (2022). Necronomicon: Fragments of Nergak. ISBN 978-2898063114.
- Free, Joshua (2024). Hidden Keys of the Necronomicon: Nabu's Guide to Crossing the Seven Gates of Ascension. ISBN 978-1961509436. Liber-S1A, 5 (5A), 6 (5B).
- Free, Joshua (2020). Necronomicon: The Complete Anunnaki Legacy. ISBN 978-0578646008. Liber-N, L, G, 9, I, M, S, W, 50, 51, R, 555, E, K, T, S-1Y+MMC-IIB.
  - Free, Joshua; Kaos, Kyra (2018). Necronomicon: The Anunnaki Bible. ISBN 978-0692190104. Liber-N, L, G, 9, W, M, S.
  - Free, Joshua (2019). Gates of the Necronomicon: The Secret Anunnaki Tradition of Babylon. ISBN 978-0578432830. Liber-50, 51, R, 555.
  - Free, Joshua (2019). Necronomicon: The Anunnaki Grimoire (Practical Babylonian Magick). ISBN 978-0578505947. Liber-E, W, M, K.
  - Free, Joshua; Gardner, Rowen (2023). Novem Portis: Necronomicon Revelations (Nine Gates of the Kingdom of Shadows) and Crossing to the Abyss (A Mardukite Guide to the Simon Necronomicon). ISBN 979-8987124925. Liber-R, 9, 555.

Canaanite Zuist tradition

- Dawson, Tess (2009). Whisper of Stone – Natib Qadish: Modern Canaanite Religion. Moon Books. ISBN 978-1846941900.
- Dawson, Tess (2011). Anointed: A Devotional Anthology for the Deities of the Near and Middle East. ISBN 978-1463728977.
- Dawson, Tess (2013). The Horned Altar: Rediscovering and Rekindling Canaanite Magic. Llewellyn Publications. ISBN 978-0738731575.

=== Academic studies ===
- Borbola, János (2005). "A magyarok Istene" [The God of the Magyars] (PDF). Ősi gyökér. Magyar kulturális szemle (in Hungarian). 33 (1–2). Miskolci Bölcsész Egyesület: 2–29. Archived (PDF) from the original on 9 October 2023.
- Boldyreva, Elena L.; Grishina, Natalia Y. (2017), Internet Influence on Political System Transformation in Iceland, Proceedings of the International Conference Internet and Modern Society (IMS-2017), pp. 225–229, doi:10.1145/3143699.3143710.
- Bromley, David G. (2018), Zuism (Iceland), World Religion and Spirituality Project, Virginia Commonwealth University.
- Csáji, László Koppány (2017). "'I joined the Party to keep ourselves out of the System'. Neo-Pagan Survival Strategies in Socialist Hungary" (PDF). Open Theology. 3 (1). De Gruyter: 211–223. doi:10.1515/opth-2017-0017. S2CID 172031600. Archived (PDF) from the original on 19 April 2018.
- Feraro, Shai (2014). "Two Steps Forward, One Step Back: The Shaping of a Community-Building Discourse among Israeli Pagans". Israel Studies Review. 29 (2): 57–77. doi:10.3167/isr.2014.290205.
- Feraro, Shai (2016). "The Return of Baal to the Holy Land: Canaanite Reconstructionism among Contemporary Israeli Pagans". Nova Religio. 20 (2): 59–81. doi:10.1525/nr.2016.20.2.59.
- Güler, Mehmet Emin (2023), Mezopotamya Dininde Rahiplik [Priesthood in Mesopotamian Religion] (in Turkish), Ankara University.
- Güler, Mehmet Emin (2024). "Antik Mezopotamya'da Görülen Dini İnanç ve Uygulamalar: Mezopotamya Dini" [Religious Beliefs and Practices in Ancient Mesopotamia: Mesopotamian Religion]. Şırnak Üniversitesi İlahiyat Fakültesi Dergisi (in Turkish). 35. Şırnak University: 450–471. doi:10.35415/sirnakifd.1513812. Archived from the original on 22 March 2025.
- Kolozsi, Ádám (2012), Social Constructions of the Native Faith: Mytho-historical Narratives and Identity-discourse in Hungarian Neo-paganism, Central European University Nationalism Studies Program, Central European University.
- Kovács, Nóra (2019), A diaszpóra visszavándorlásának ideológiai vonatkozásai Közép-Kelet Európában: Badiny Jós Ferenc Magyarországon [Ideological Aspects of Diaspora Return Migration in Central-Eastern Europe: Ferenc Badiny Jós in Hungary], Hungarian Diasporas (in Hungarian).
- Nash, Alexander (2020). "Zuism: History and Introduction" (PDF). Central European Journal for Contemporary Religion. 4 (1). Karolinum Press, Charles University: 51–69. doi:10.14712/25704893.2021.31. Archived (PDF) from the original on 17 June 2022.
- Povedák, István; Hubbes, László Attila (2014). "Competitive pasts. Ethno-paganism as a placebo-effect for identity reconstruction processes in Hungary and Romania". Religiski-filozofiski Raksti (XVII). Institute of Philosophy and Sociology, University of Latvia: 133–152. ISSN 1407-1908.
- Szilárdi, Réka (2013). "Neopaganism in Hungary: Under the Spell of Roots". In Aitamurto, Kaarina; Simpson, Scott (eds.). Modern Pagan and Native Faith Movements in Central and Eastern Europe. pp. 230–248. ISBN 978-1844656622.
- Wolfe, Jared (2015), ZU: The Life of a Sumerian Verb in Early Mesopotamia, University of California.

== See also ==
- Neopaganism
- Armenian Hetanism
- Egyptian Kemetism
- Germanic Heathenry
- Turko-Mongolic Tengrism
- Zu (band), Italian instrumental music band whose name is inspired by the ancient Sumerian concept
