= Pilgrimage to the Cedars in Lebanon =

1907 painting by Tivadar Csontváry Kosztka

- Zarándoklás a cédrusokhoz Libanonban (Hungarian)
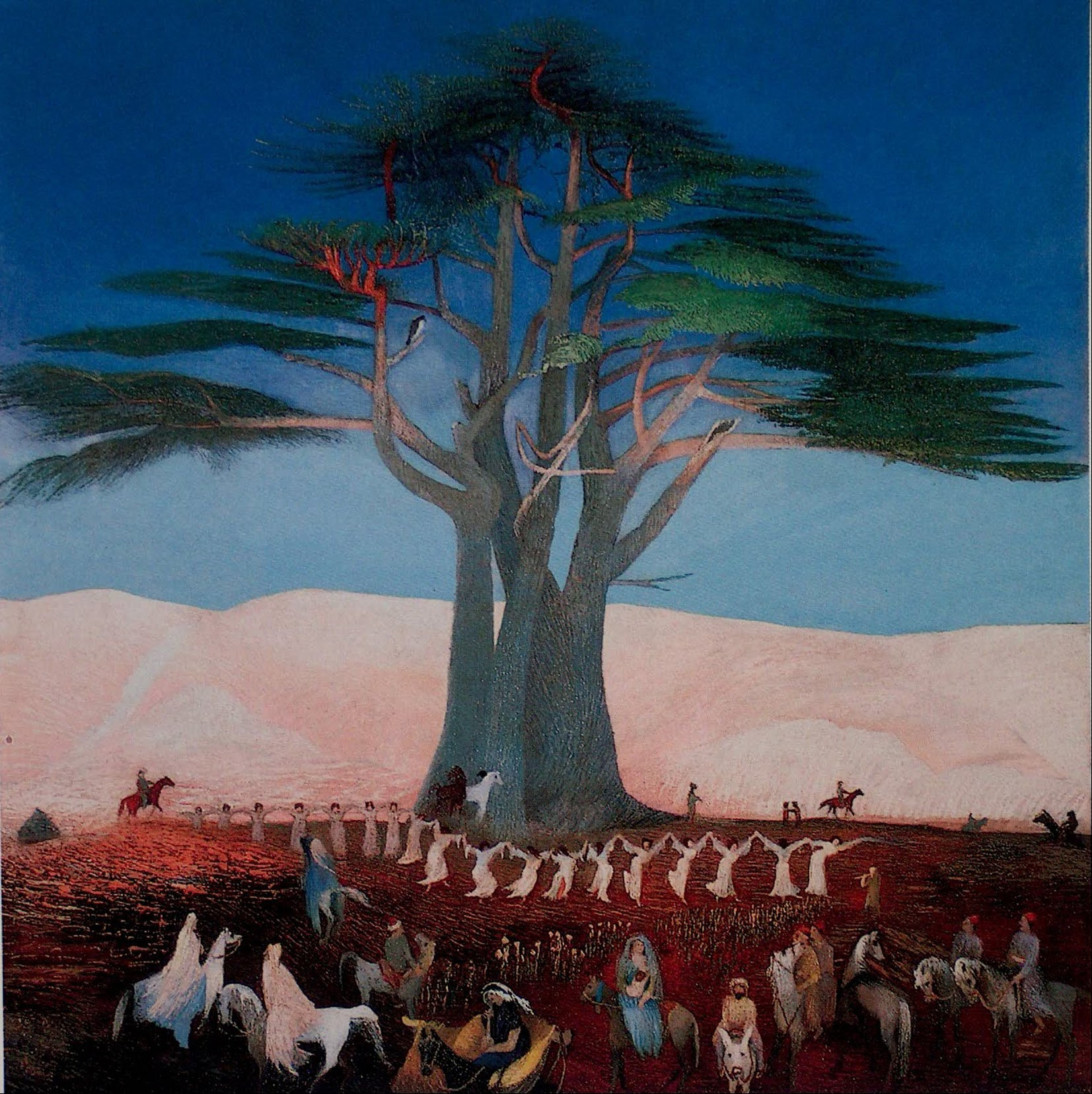
- Artist: Tivadar Csontváry Kosztka
- Year: 1907
- Medium: oil on canvas
- Dimensions: 200 cm × 192 cm (79 in × 76 in)
- Location: Hungarian National Museum, Budapest

Pilgrimage to Cedars of Lebanon (Hungarian: Zarándoklás a cédrusokhoz Libanonban) is a picture of the Hungarian painter Tivadar Csontváry Kosztka of 1907.

== Description ==
The picture is painted with oil paints and has dimensions of 200 × 192 cm. The picture is in the Hungarian National Gallery in Budapest.

It is one of the best-known works of Hungarian painting. After 40 years Tivadar Csontváry Kosztka left pharmaceuticals and took up art. He traveled thousands of miles in search of inspiration. The picture of cedar trees painted in Lebanon while on pilgrimage is a key part of his work. The symbolism stems from the strong religious character. According to the ancient beliefs, cedars play an important role in ancient Hungarian mythology. The cedar is a symbol of fertility, assumed to be the tree of life and the tree of knowledge.

In his painting, Csontváry presents his outlook, which is reflected in the art. It is a complex system of symbols, and synthesizes diverse content.
