= Tivadar Csontváry Kosztka =

Hungarian painter (1853–1919)

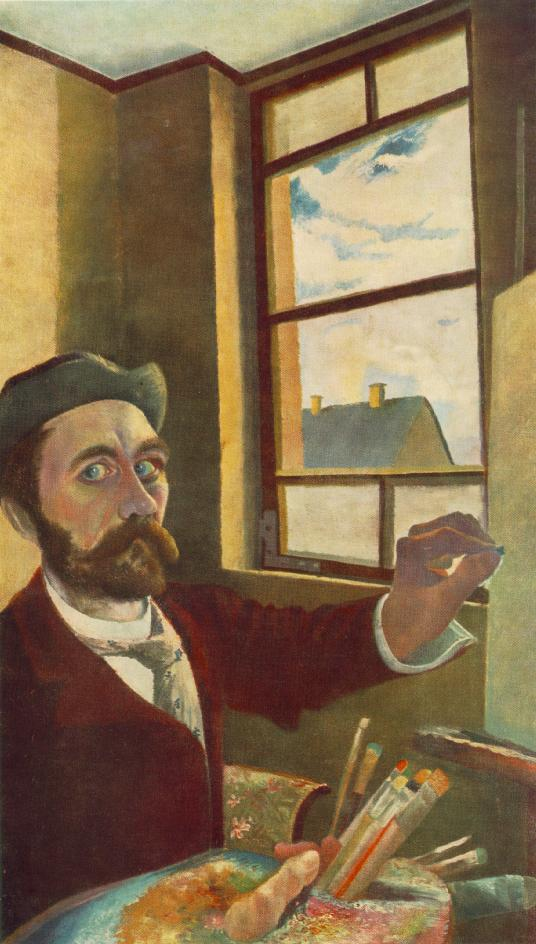
- Self-portrait (around 1900)
- Born: 5 July 1853; Kisszeben, Kingdom of Hungary, Austrian Empire (now Sabinov, Slovakia)
- Died: 20 June 1919 (aged 65); Budapest, Hungary
- Known for: Painter
- Movement: Post-Impressionism, expressionism

Tivadar Csontváry Kosztka born Mihály Tivadar Kosztka (Hungarian pronunciation: [ˈtivɒdɒr ˈt͡ʃontvaːri ˈkostkɒ]; 5 July 1853 – 20 June 1919) was a Hungarian painter who was part of the avant-garde movement of the early twentieth century. Working mostly in Budapest, he was one of the first Hungarian painters to become known in Europe. He belonged to no specific school of art, but his works included elements similar to those of the foremost painters of Post-impressionism. Many critics consider him Hungary’s greatest painter. On 15 December 2006 the Kieselbach Gallery in Budapest sold an auction the most expensive Csontváry painting so far. The Rendezvous (1902) ("Meeting of the lovers") was bought by an anonymous client for more than one million EUR.

His works are held by the Hungarian National Gallery in Budapest and the Csontváry Museum in Pécs, among other institutions and private collectors.

== Biography ==
Csontváry was born on 5 July 1853 in Kisszeben, Sáros County, Kingdom of Hungary (today Sabinov, Slovakia), and died 20 June 1919 in Budapest. His father, Dr. László Kosztka, was a physician and pharmacist, his mother was Franciska Hajczelmajer of Darócz (now Šarišské Dravce, Slovakia). His ancestors on his father's side were Poles who settled in Hungary. Although Csontváry was deeply focused on his Magyar roots, he grew up speaking Slovak mixed with German. He also possessed fluent knowledge of Hungarian and his written legacy (autobiographical content, art notes etc) are mostly in Hungarian, with a few additions in German, Italian etc.due to his world travels. He was a pharmacist until his twenties.

On the hot sunny afternoon of 13 October 1880, when he was 27 years old, he had a mystic vision. He heard a voice saying, "You are going to be the greatest painter of the world, greater than Raphael." He took journeys around Europe, visited the galleries of the Vatican, and returned to Hungary to earn money for his journeys by working as an apothecary. From 1890, he traveled around the world. He visited Paris, the Mediterraneum (Dalmatia, Italy, Greece), North Africa and the Middle East (modern day Lebanon, modern day Israel, Egypt, modern day Syria) and painted pictures. Often his pictures are very large, several meters (yards) wide and height is not unusual.

He painted his major works between 1903 and 1909. He had some exhibitions in Paris (1907) and Western Europe. Most of the critics in Western Europe recognized his abilities, art and congeniality, but in the Kingdom of Hungary during his life, he was considered to be an eccentric crank for several reasons, e. g. for his vegetarianism, anti-alcoholism, anti-smoking, pacifism, and his cloudy, prophetic writings and pamphlets about his life (Curriculum), genius (The Authority, The Genius) and religious philosophy (The Positivum). Some of his biographists considered this as a latent, but increasingly disruptive schizophrenia. Although he was later acclaimed, during his lifetime Csontváry found little understanding for his visionary, expressionistic style. A loner by nature, his "failure" impaired his creative power.

After his death, 42 of Csontváry's paintings lay rolled up, and his heirs almost sold them to be used as cart tarp. They might have been lost forever, if an architect named Gedeon Gerlóczy had not been searching for a studio at the very time and in the very place, stumbling upon the paintings and buying them. For fifty years, these works of art were gathering dust in Gerlóczy's apartment.

He painted more than one hundred pictures, the most famous and emblematic of which is probably The Lonely Cedar (Magányos cédrus). His art connects with post-impressionism and expressionism, but he was an autodidact and cannot be classified into one style. He identified as a "sunway"-painter, a term which he created.

== Csontváry and mental disorder ==
Csontváry is remembered as the “mad painter” in Hungary. Sources, including his own diary indicate that he had suffered from mental disorder at least from the time of his first auditory hallucination experienced at age 27. Many believe that his unique artistic style is a product of his mental difficulties, although opinion is split as to what, if any mental disorder affected Csontváry and whether that is reflected in his art.

== Legacy ==
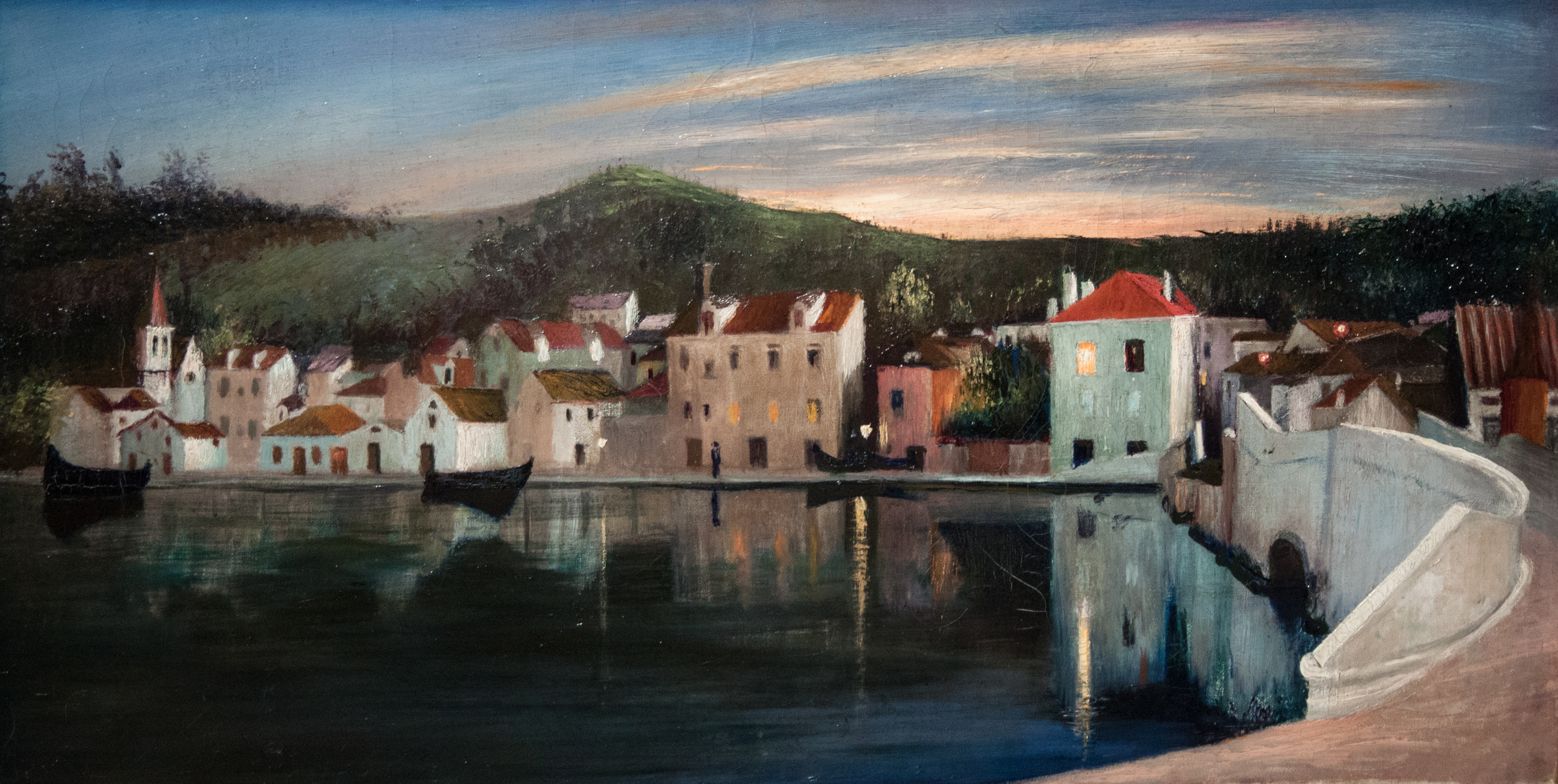
Traui at sunset

- The Csontváry Museum in Pécs, Hungary, was founded in his honor and holds many of his works.
- The Museum of Fine Arts, the Hungarian National Gallery in Budapest and the Janus Pannonius Museum of Pecs held a joint exhibition called "Csontvary 170" in 2023.

== A quote ==
"I, Tivadar Kosztka, who gave up his prime of youth for the rebirth of the world, accepting the call of the invisible Spirit, had a regular civil job, comfort, wealth then (...) Going to Paris in 1907 I oppositely stood alone in front of millions with only the result of the divine providence, and I beat the vanity of the world hollow, but I haven't killed 10 million people, only sobered them, I haven't made commercials from things, because I didn't care for the pedlar's press; I retired from the world instead, going to the top of the Lebanons, and I painted cedars."

T., Cs. K.: The Positivum.

== Gallery ==
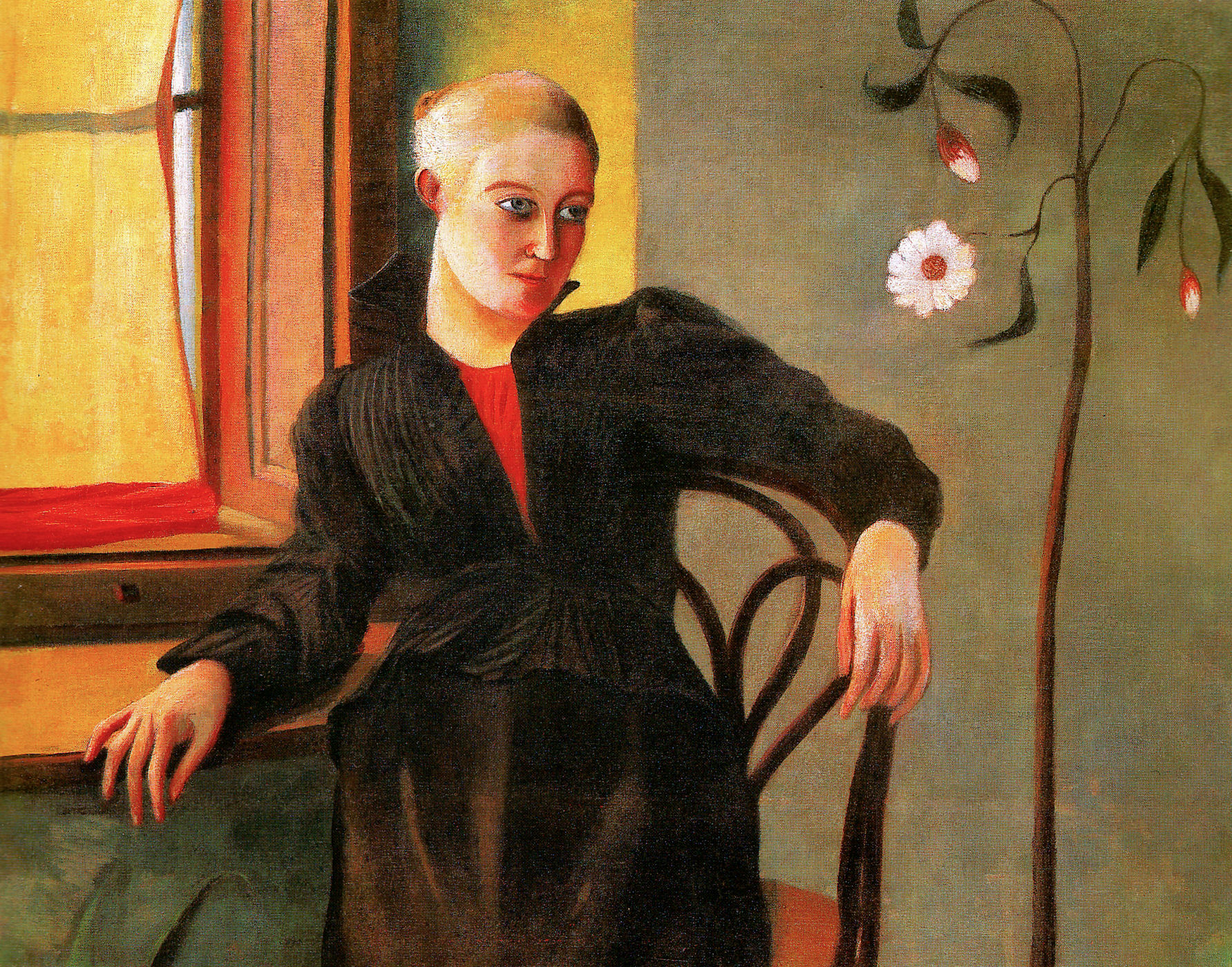
Woman sitting in the window.

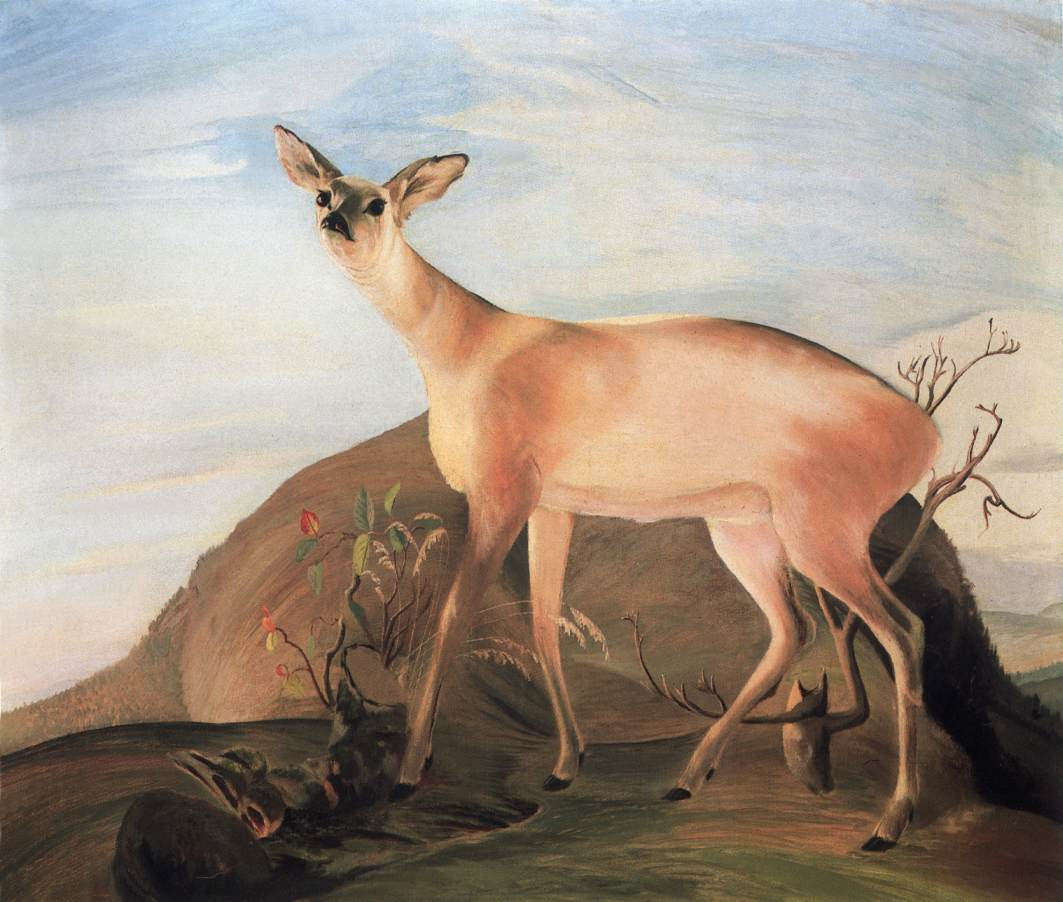
Deer.

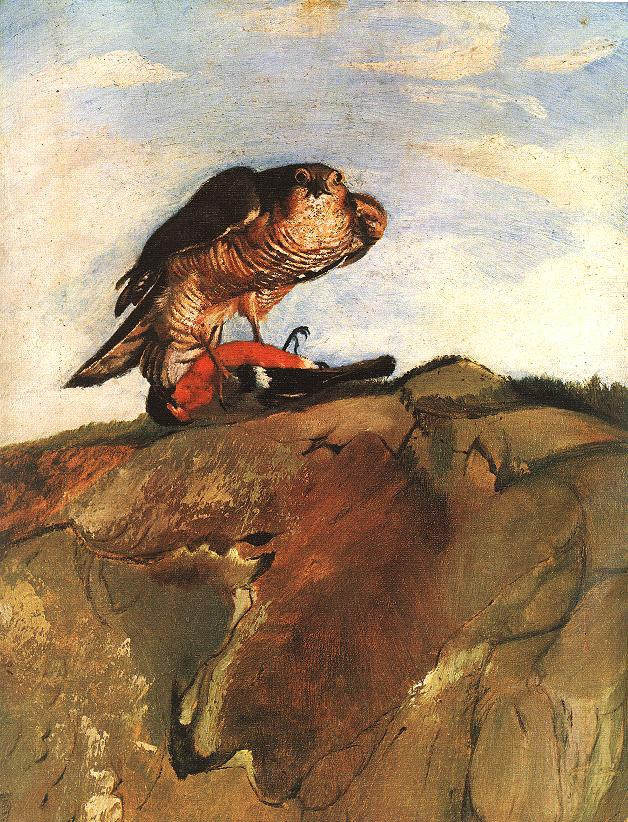
Bird of Prey.

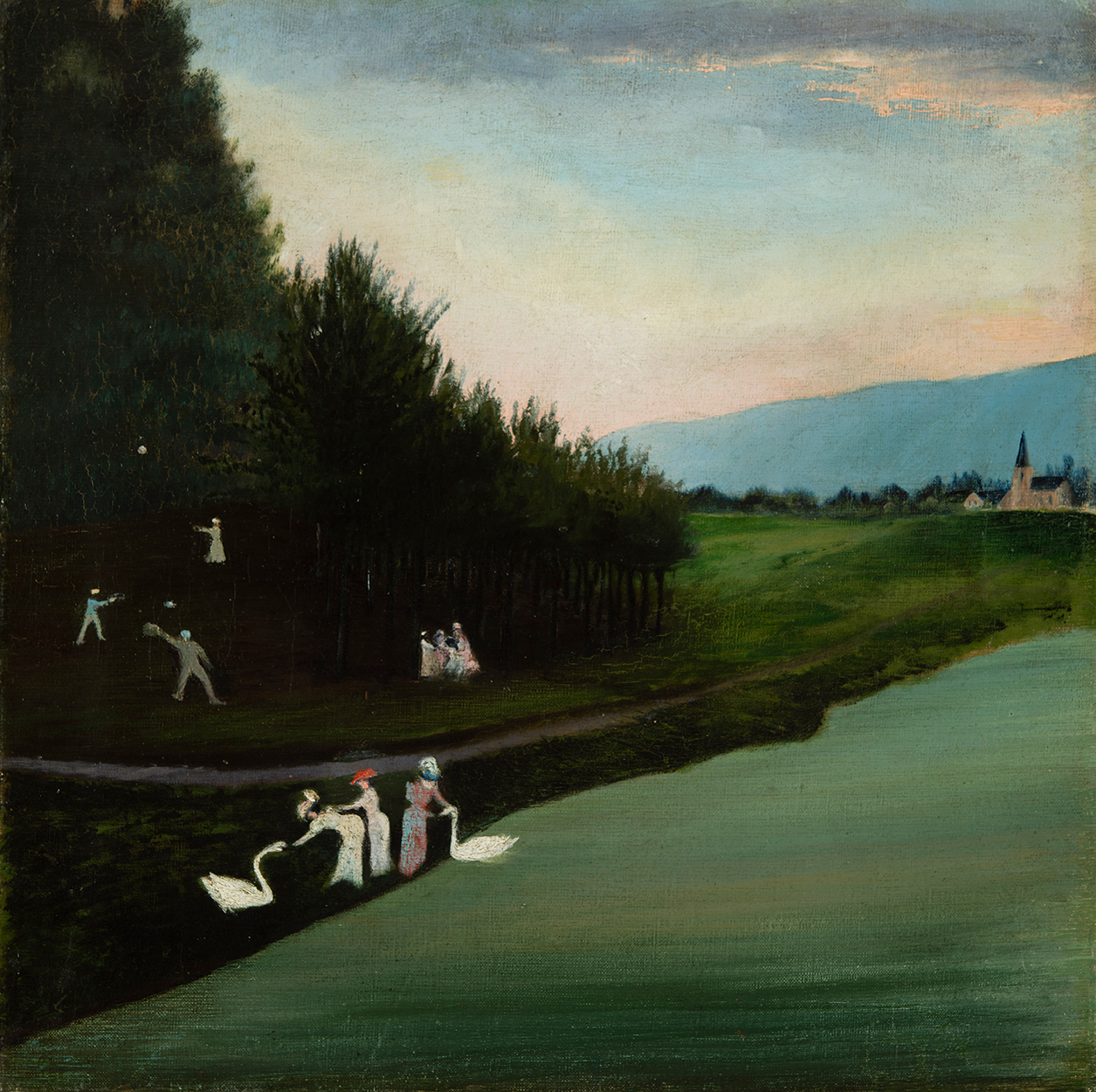
Tennis party.

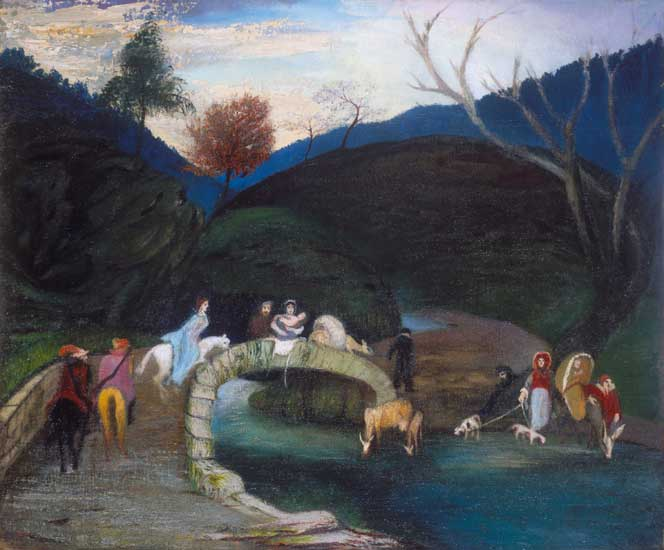
People passing a bridge, 1901

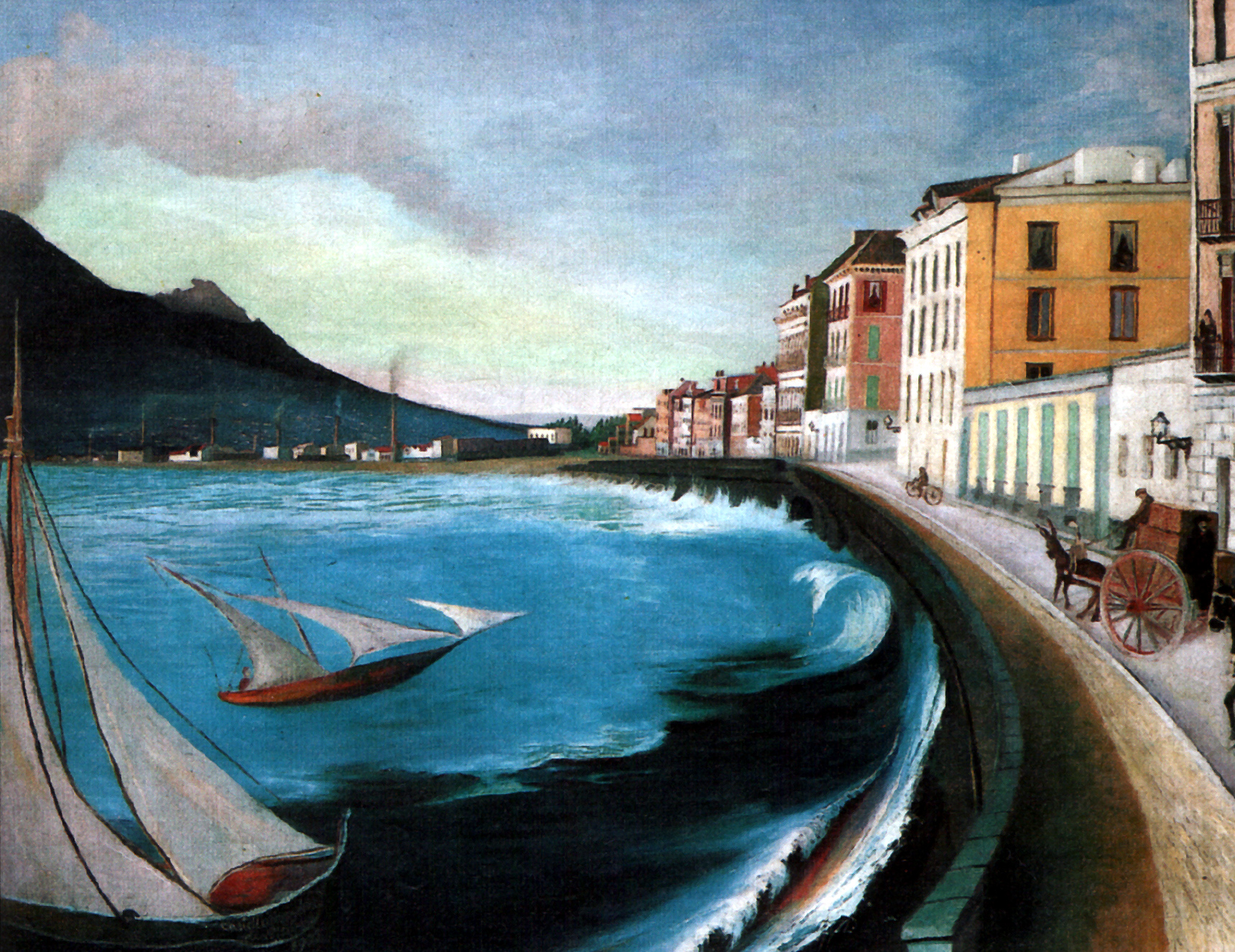
Castellamare di stabia, 1902

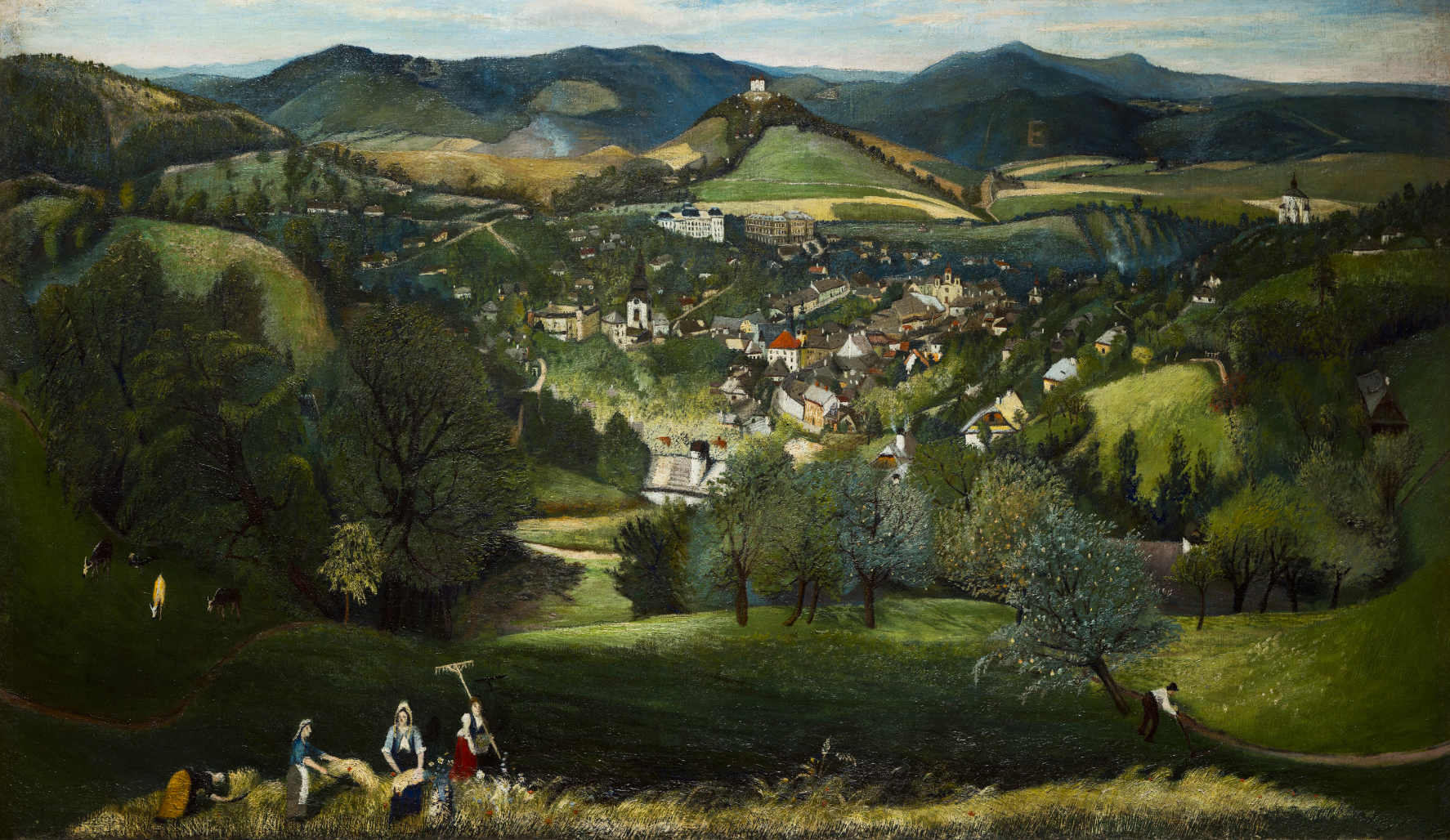
Panorama of Selmecbánya

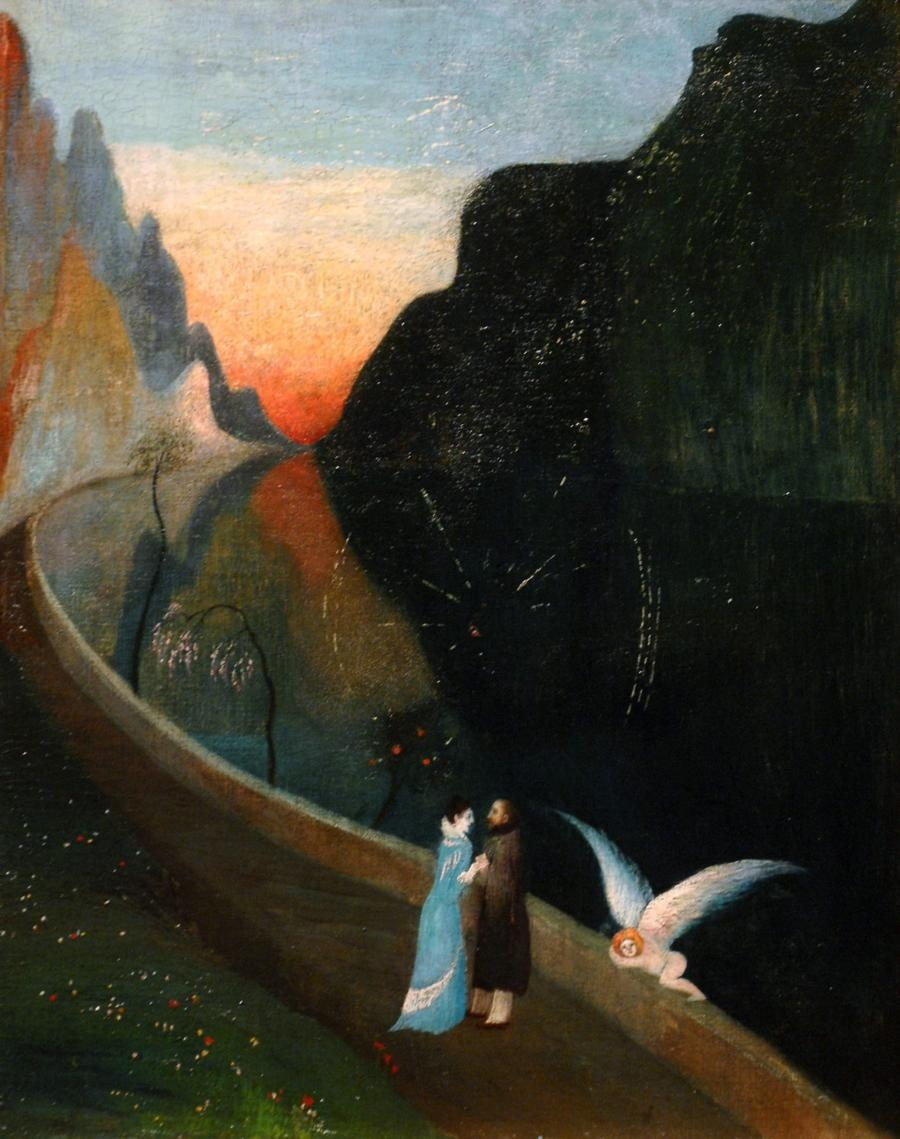
Rendez-vous of Lovers, c. 1902

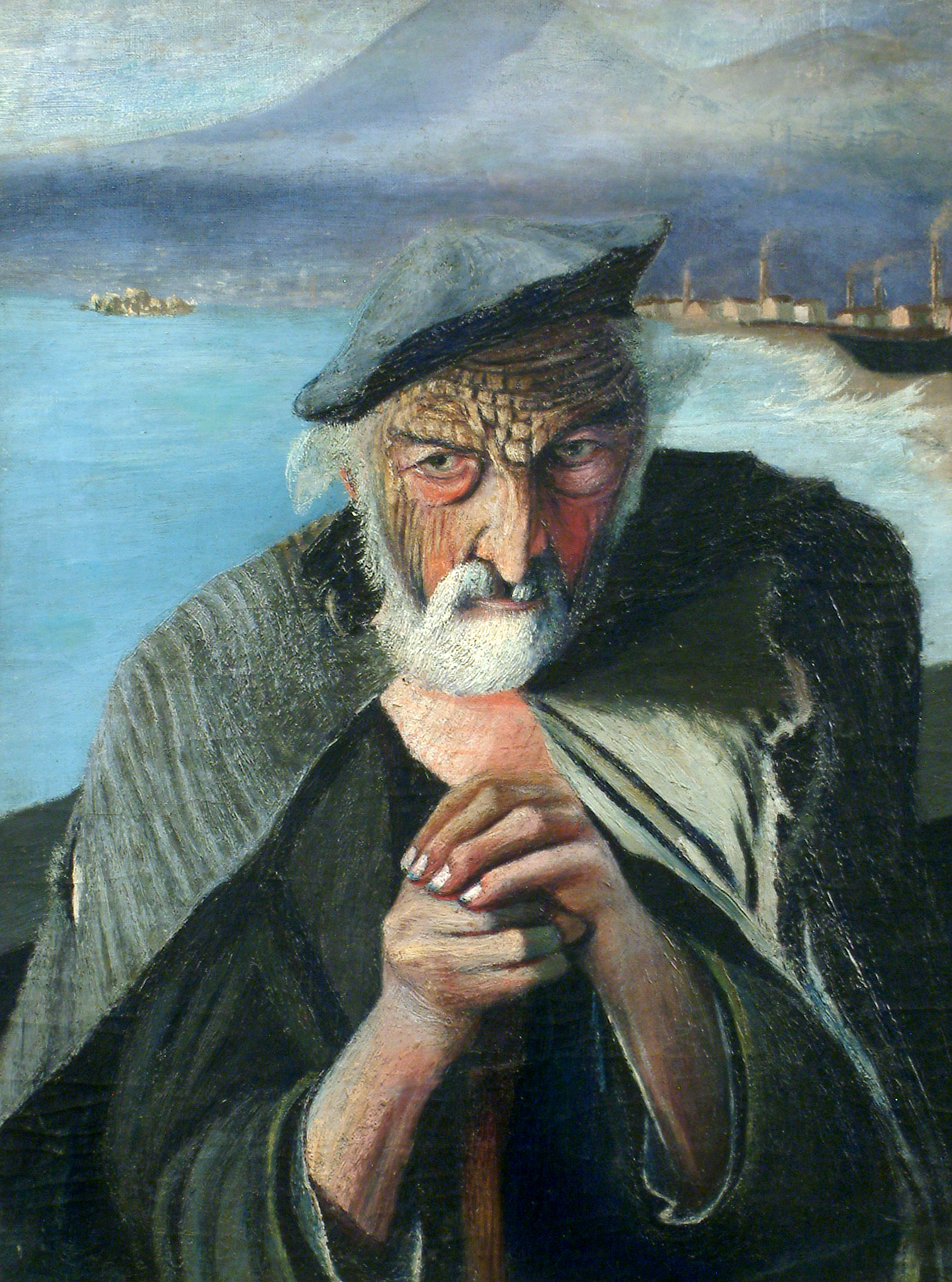
Old Fisherman

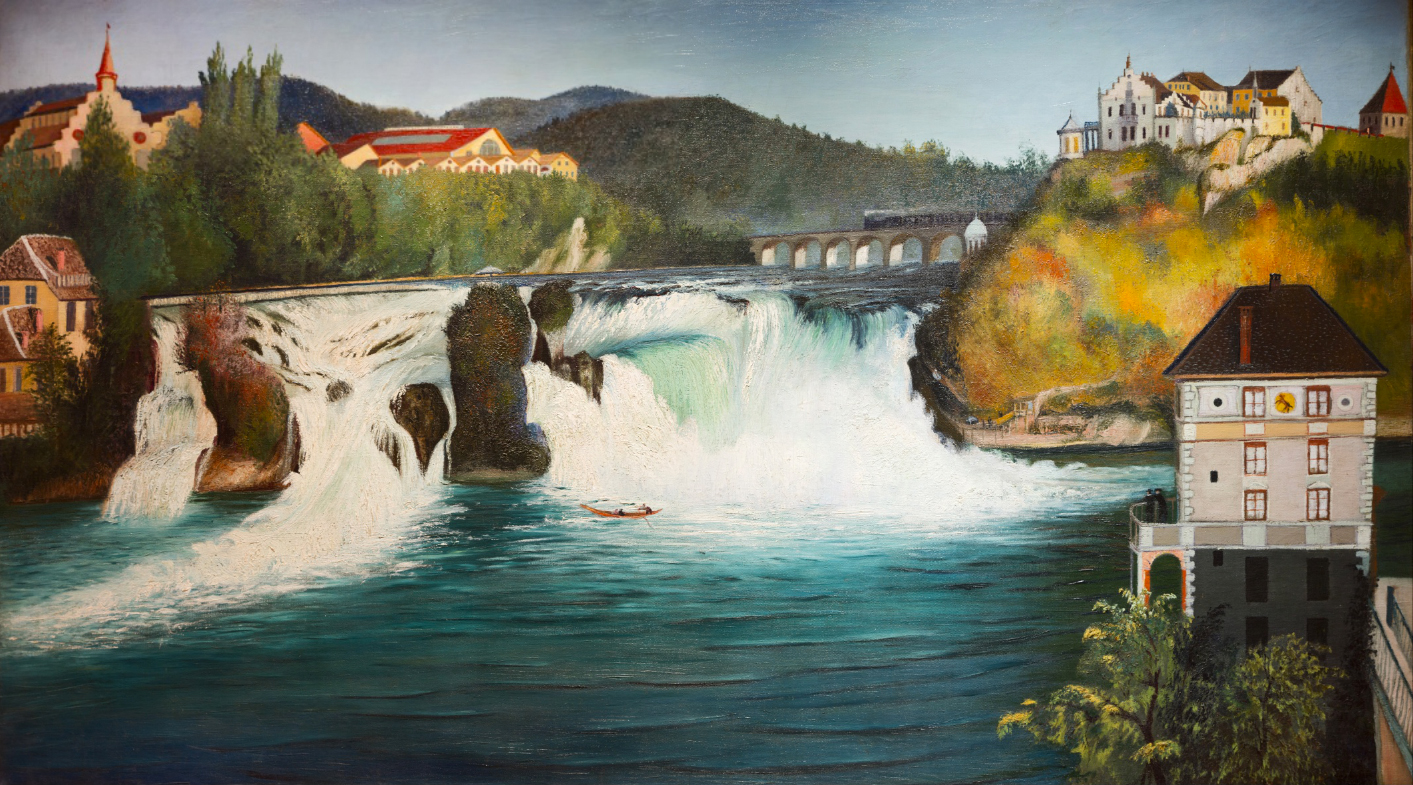
Waterfall at Schaffhausen 1903

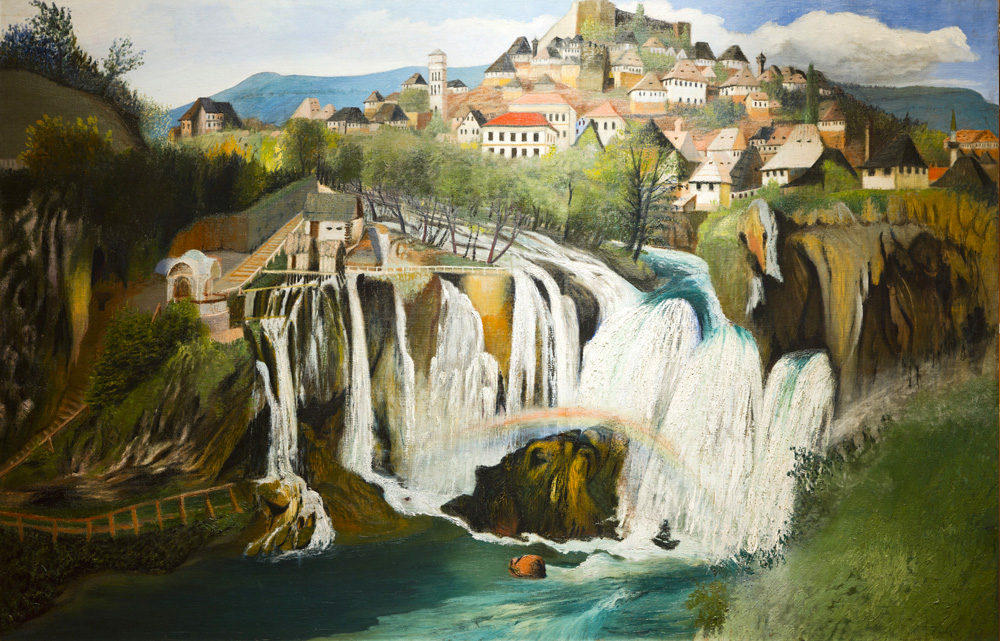
Waterfall at Jajce

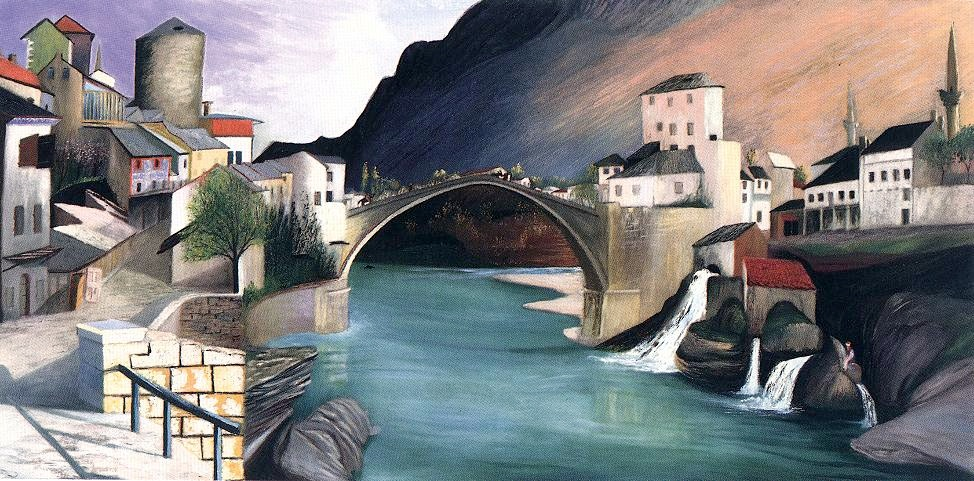
Tivadar Csontváry Kosztka, painting 1903

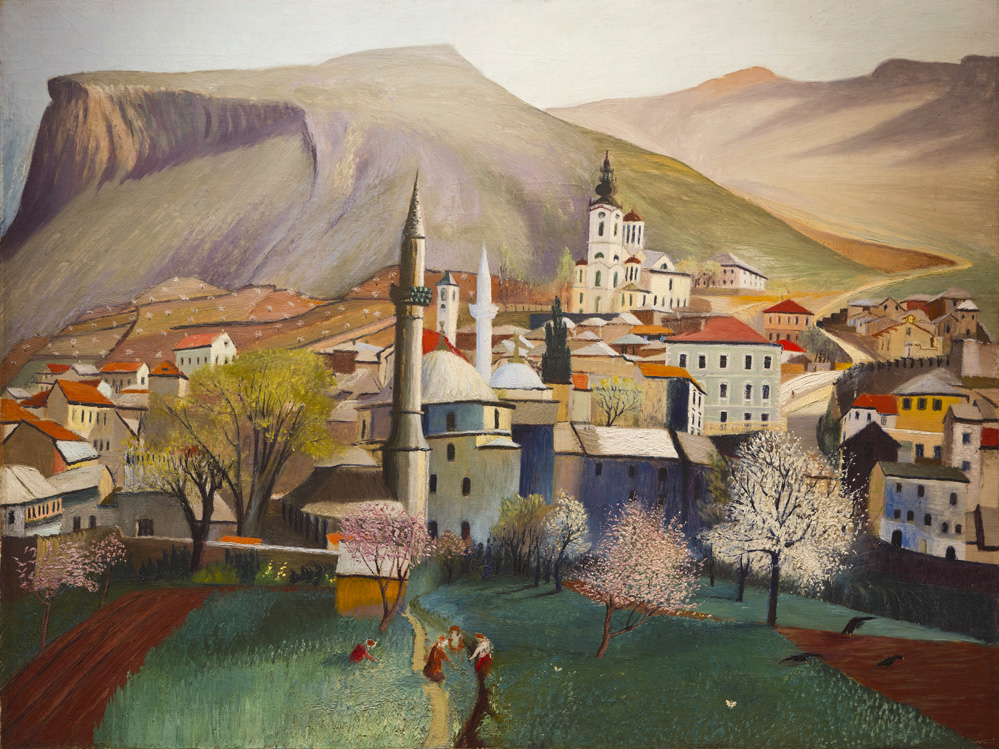
Springtime in Mostar, 1903, Csontváry Museum, Pécs

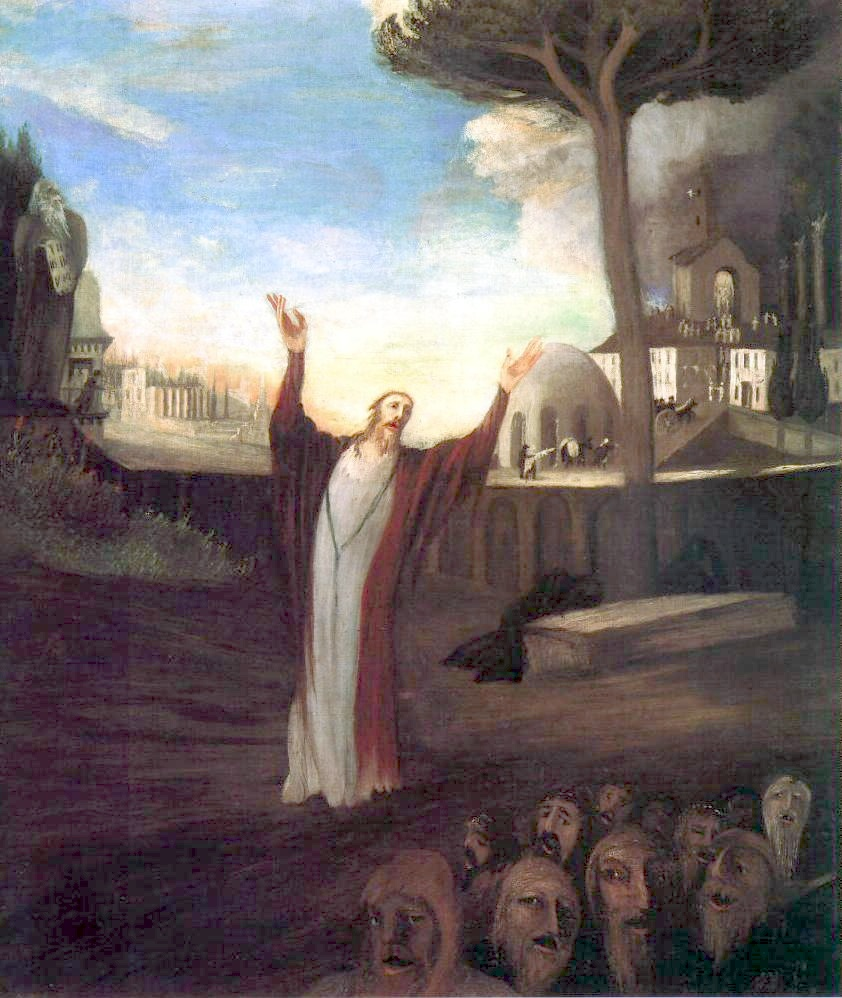
The praying Prophet (The Young Man from Nain), 1903.

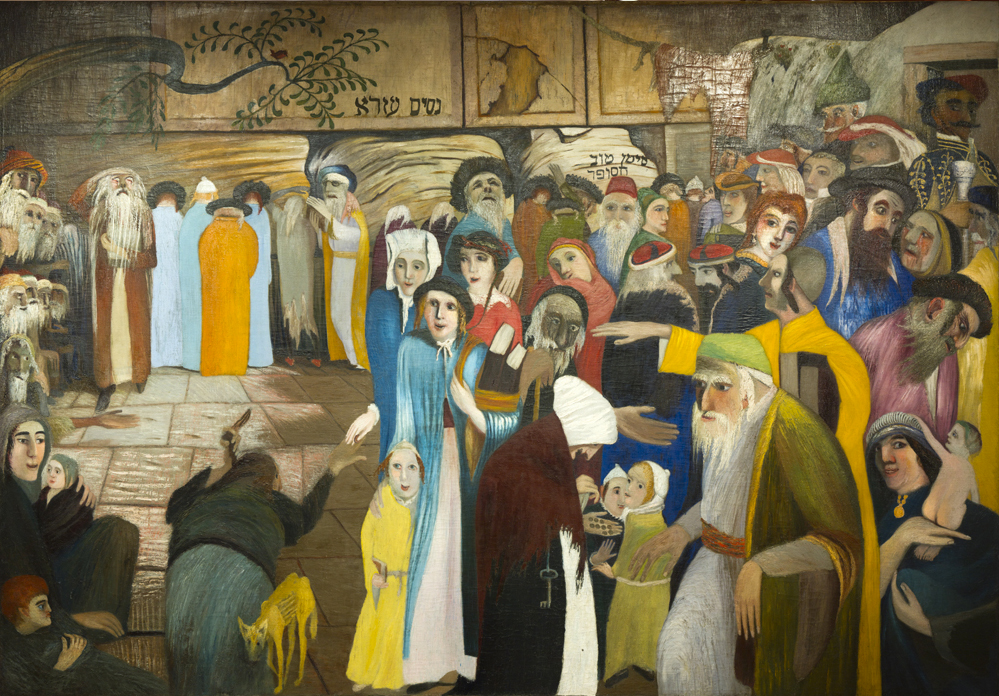
The Wailing Wall in Jerusalem, 1904

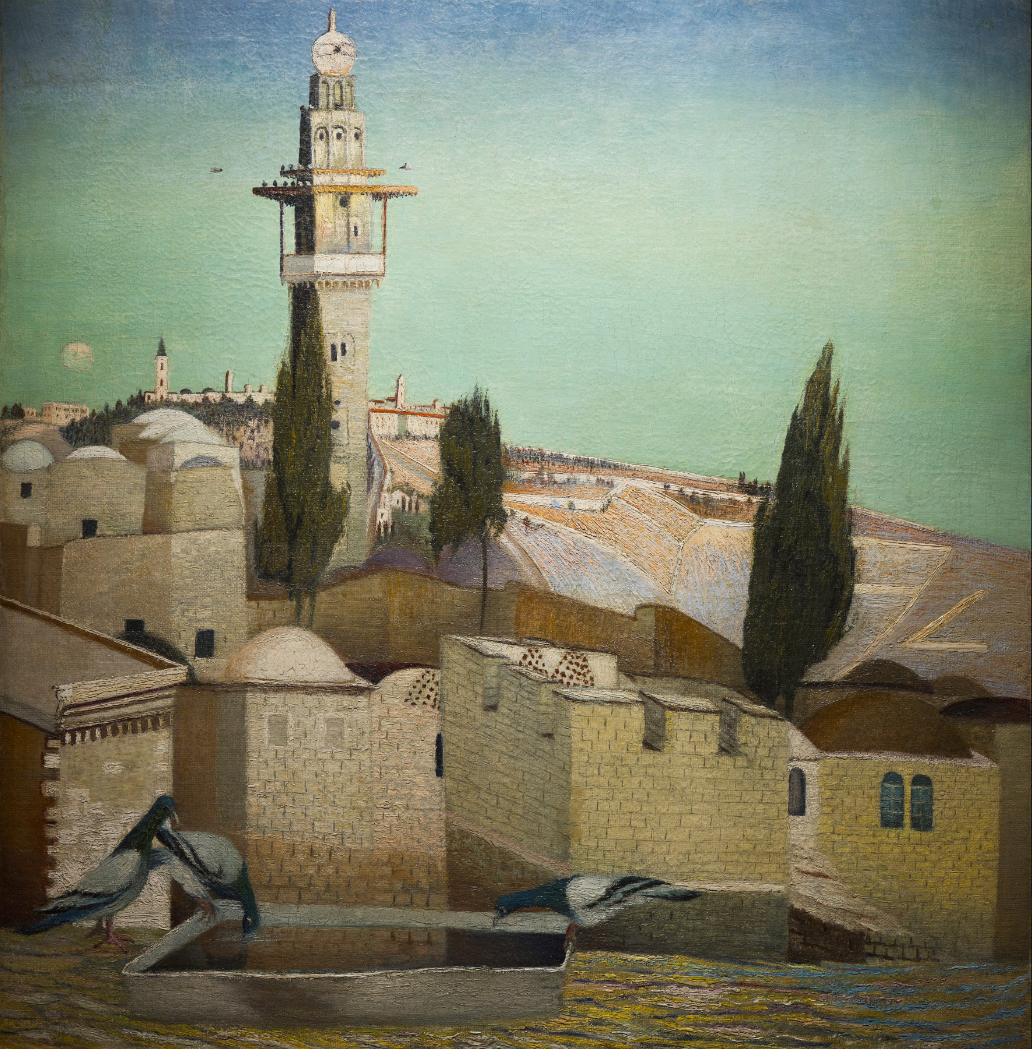
The Mount of Olives in Jerusalem

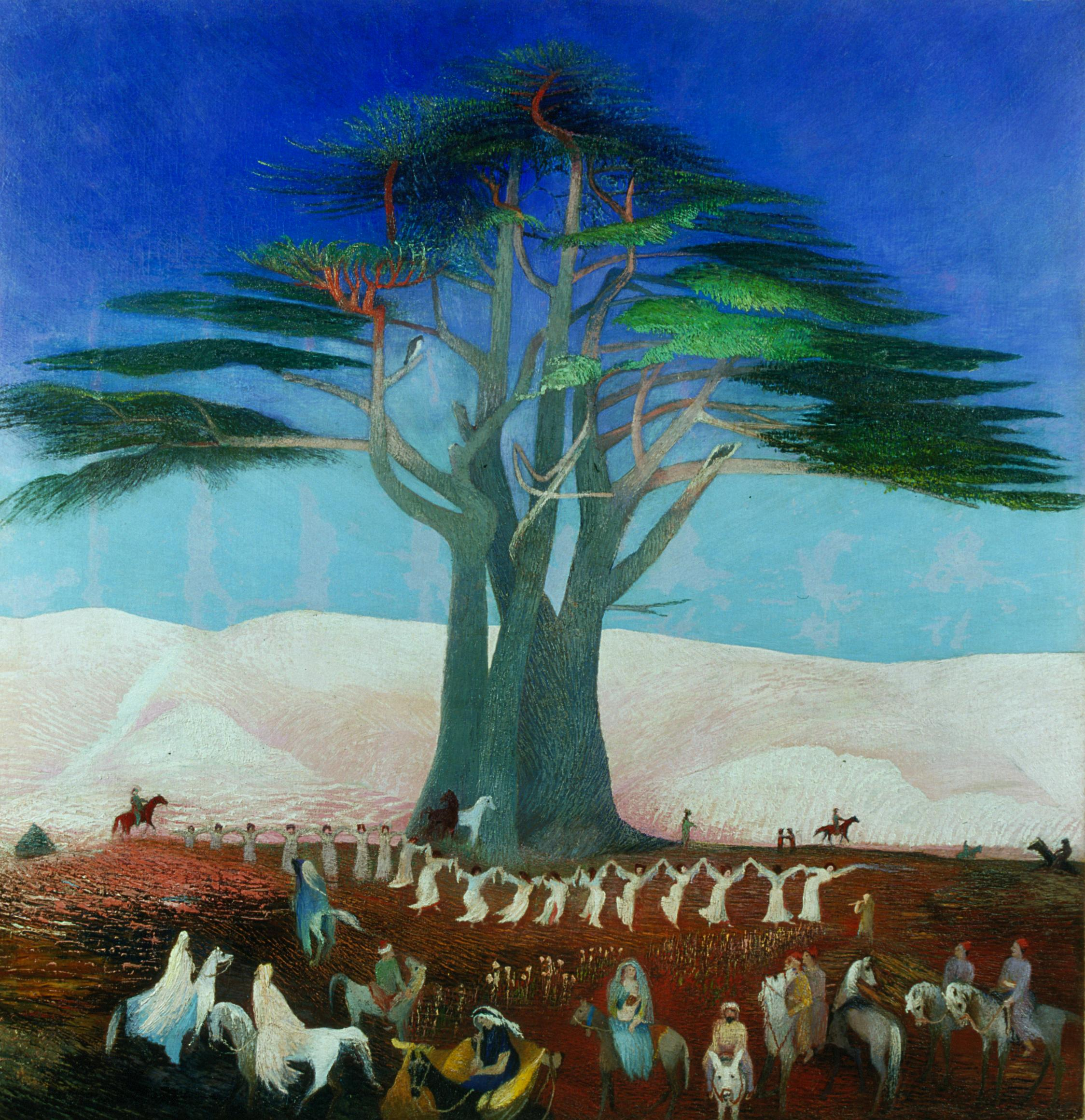
Pilgrimage to the Cedars in Lebanon, 1907, Hungarian National Gallery, Budapest

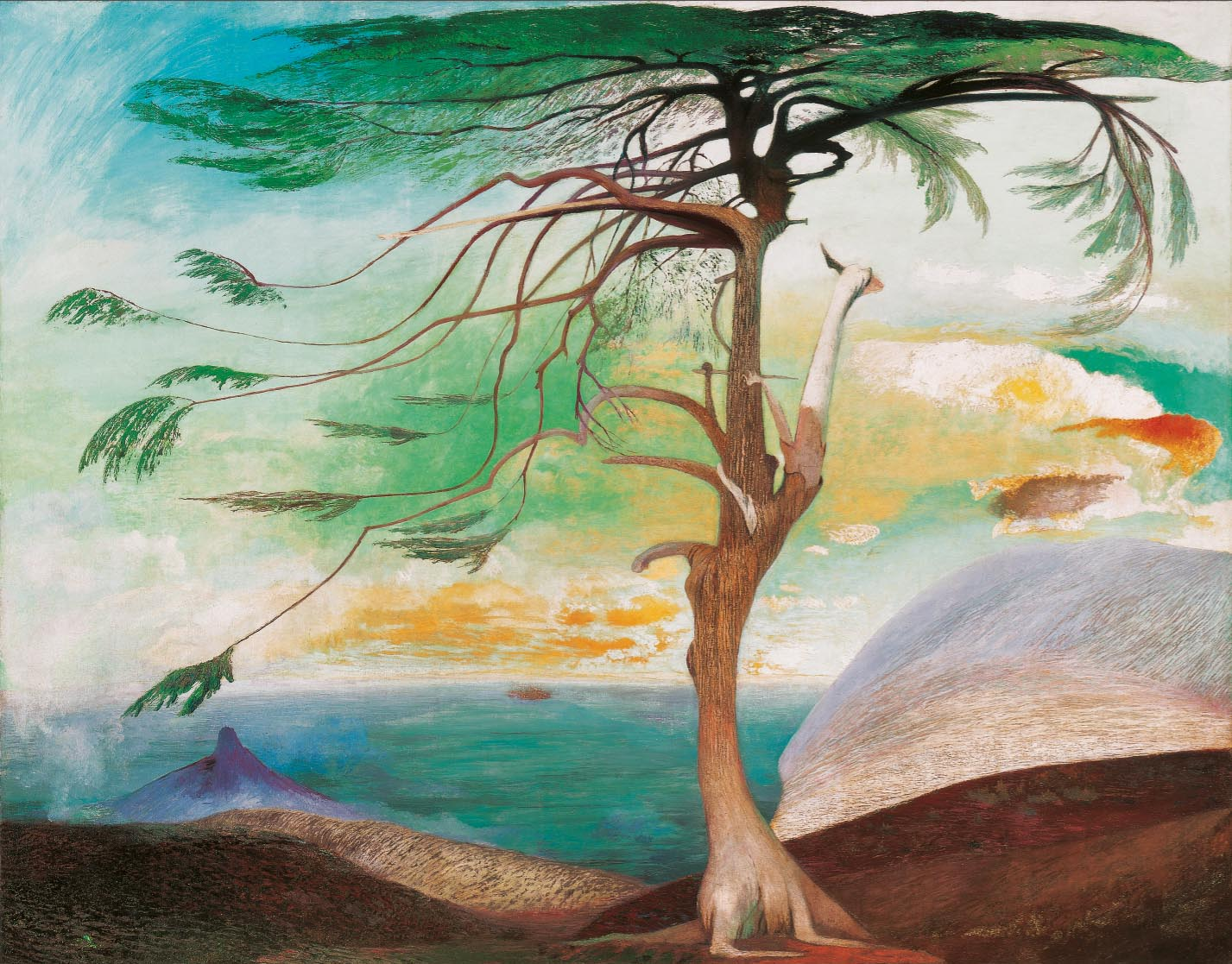
The Lonely Cedar, 1907, Csontváry Museum, Pécs

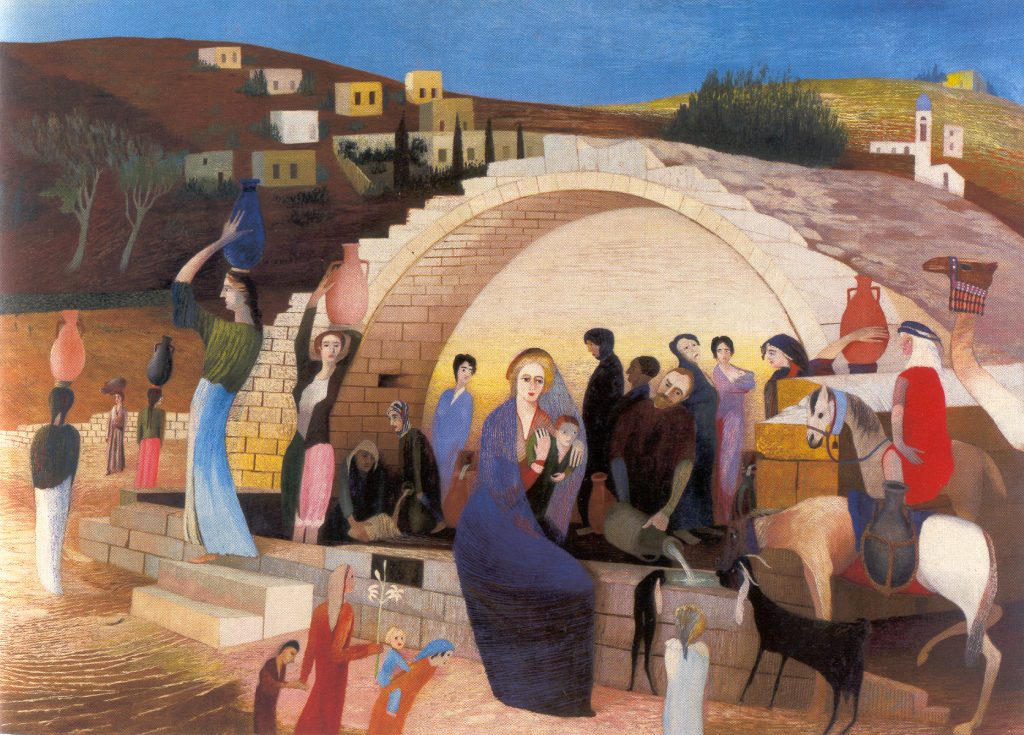
Maria's well in Nazareth

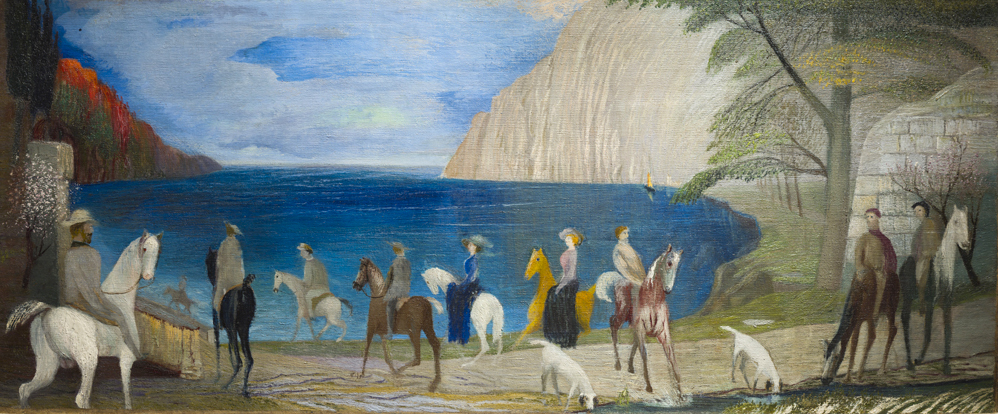
The riders at the sea, 1909

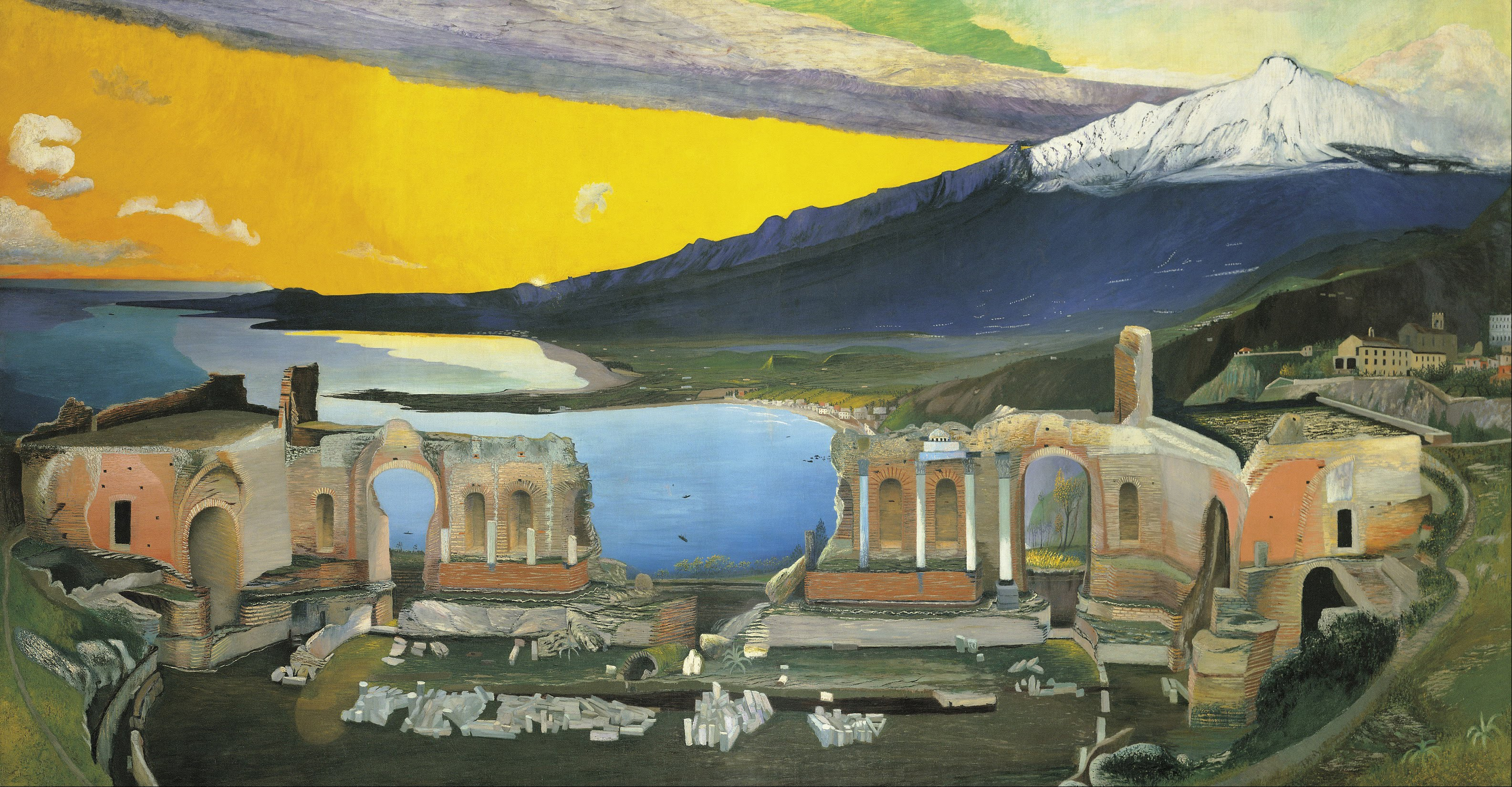
Ruins of Greek Theatre at Taormina, 1905, Hungarian National Gallery, Budapest

== Sources ==
- Mansbach, Steven A.; V. West, Richard (1991). Standing in the tempest: painters of the Hungarian avant-garde, 1908-1930. Santa Barbara Museum of Art. ISBN 978-0-262-13274-9.
