= National Register of Historic Places listings in Ashe County, North Carolina =

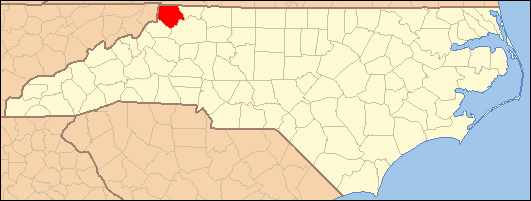

This list includes properties and districts listed on the National Register of Historic Places in Ashe County, North Carolina. Click the "Map of all coordinates" link to the right to view an online map of all properties and districts with latitude and longitude coordinates in the table below.

== Current listings ==
This National Park Service list is complete through NPS recent listings posted March 14, 2025.

	Name on the Register	Image	Date listed	Location	City or town	Description
1	Shubal V. Alexander Archeological District		September 1, 1978 (#78001928)	Address Restricted	Crumpler	
2	Ashe County Courthouse	Ashe County Courthouse	May 10, 1979 (#79001658)	301 E. Main St. 36°25′15″N 81°28′13″W	Jefferson	
3	Ashe County Memorial Hospital	Ashe County Memorial Hospital	April 28, 2015 (#15000179)	410 McConnell St. 36°25′02″N 81°28′46″W	Jefferson	
4	Baptist Chapel Church and Cemetery	Baptist Chapel Church and Cemetery	November 13, 1976 (#76001302)	E of Helton on SR 1527; 36°32′51″N 81°26′42″W	Helton	
5	Blue Ridge Parkway	Blue Ridge Parkway	December 13, 2024 (#100011353)	Blue Ridge Parkway through Virginia and North Carolina; 36°19′08″N 81°22′08″W	Jefferson vicinity	
6	Bower-Cox House	Bower-Cox House	November 7, 1976 (#76001303)	SW of Scottville on SR 1595; 36°26′43″N 81°21′52″W	Scottville	
7	Brinegar District		March 21, 1978 (#78001929)	Address Restricted	Crumpler	
8	Clark-Miller Roller Mill	Clark-Miller Roller Mill	August 19, 2014 (#14000491)	180 Long Branch Rd. 36°30′23″N 81°31′17″W	Lansing	
9	Cockerham Mill	Cockerham Mill	December 10, 2014 (#14001022)	1580 Dog Creek Rd. Extension; 36°25′04″N 81°23′03″W	Cockerham	
10	A.S. Cooper Farm	A.S. Cooper Farm	September 24, 2001 (#01001028)	Cranberry Springs Rd., approx. 0.2 miles SE of jct. with Todd RR Grade Rd. 36°16′33″N 81°32′56″W	Brownwood	
11	Samuel Cox House	Samuel Cox House	November 7, 1976 (#76001304)	SW of Scottville off U.S. 221 on SR 1636; 36°28′28″N 81°18′51″W	Scottville	
12	Elkland School Gymnasium	Elkland School Gymnasium	June 22, 2004 (#04000646)	10279 Three Top Rd., NC 1100 at jct. of NC 194; 36°18′55″N 81°36′00″W	Todd	
13	Glendale Springs Inn	Glendale Springs Inn	October 10, 1979 (#79003326)	NC 16 and SR 1632; 36°20′42″N 81°22′52″W	Glendale Springs	
14	Grassy Creek Historic District		December 12, 1976 (#76001300)	SR 1535 and SR 1573; 36°33′53″N 81°23′08″W	Grassy Creek	
15	R. T. Greer and Company Root and Herb Warehouse	R. T. Greer and Company Root and Herb Warehouse	April 18, 2003 (#03000269)	7181 Railroad Grade Rd., jct. of Todd Railroad Grad Rd. at Cranberry Springs Rd. 36°16′43″N 81°33′14″W	Todd	
16	Lansing Historic District		August 18, 2011 (#11000544)	Roughly bounded by NC 194, G & A Sts. 36°29′59″N 81°30′39″W	Lansing	Ashe County, North Carolina, c. 1799-1955 MPS
17	Lansing School	Lansing School	January 8, 2009 (#08001288)	East side of NC 194 at junction with NC 1517; 36°30′01″N 81°30′19″W	Lansing	
18	Miller Homestead	Miller Homestead	September 24, 2001 (#01001029)	324 Miller Dr. 36°29′32″N 81°33′25″W	Lansing	
19	Cicero Pennington Farm	Cicero Pennington Farm	September 11, 2018 (#100002925)	630 Spencer Branch Rd. 36°33′50″N 81°29′14″W	Sturgills	
20	Perry-Shepherd Farm		April 19, 2006 (#06000289)	410 Swansie Shepherd Rd. 36°30′34″N 81°33′55″W	Lansing	
21	John M. Pierce House	John M. Pierce House	November 7, 1976 (#76001298)	N of Crumpler on SR 1559; 36°31′52″N 81°20′58″W	Crumpler	
22	Poe Fish Weir		May 22, 1978 (#78001930)	Address Restricted	Jefferson	
23	Thompson's Bromine and Arsenic Springs	Thompson's Bromine and Arsenic Springs	October 22, 1976 (#76001299)	W of Crumpler on SR 1542; 36°30′08″N 81°23′45″W	Crumpler	
24	Todd Historic District		January 28, 2000 (#00000017)	Along Todd Railroad Grade Rd., Big Hill Rd., and Carter Miller Rd. 36°18′32″N 81°35′51″W	Todd	
25	John W. Tucker House	John W. Tucker House	July 29, 1985 (#85001685)	State Route 1353; 36°31′16″N 81°33′09″W	Tuckerdale	
26	William Waddell House	William Waddell House	November 7, 1976 (#76001301)	West of Grassy Creek off NC 16 on State Route 1532; 36°34′09″N 81°26′17″W	Grassy Creek	
27	West Jefferson Historic District	West Jefferson Historic District	October 5, 2007 (#07001076)	Roughly bounded by State St., 3rd Ave., 2nd St.& Wilton Ave. 36°24′07″N 81°29′32″W	West Jefferson	
28	Worth's Chapel	Worth's Chapel	September 28, 2005 (#05001097)	175 Three Top Rd. 36°27′54″N 81°37′16″W	Creston	

== See also ==
- National Register of Historic Places listings in North Carolina
- List of National Historic Landmarks in North Carolina
