= List of presidential trips made by Bill Clinton (1998) =

This is a list of presidential trips made by Bill Clinton during 1998, the sixth year of his presidency as the 42nd president of the United States. International trips are highlighted in blue.

This list excludes trips made within Washington, D.C., the U.S. federal capital in which the White House, the official residence and principal workplace of the president, is located. It also excludes the capital's immediate surroundings in Maryland and Virginia, such as Andrews Air Force Base in Maryland, where the president typically boards Air Force One for all trips outside the area. Also excluded are trips to Camp David, the country residence of the president.

== January ==
State or country	Areas visited	Dates	Details
South Carolina	Hilton Head	December 30–January 1	Attended a Renaissance Weekend Institute New Year's Eve dinner at the Hyatt Regency hotel.
U.S. Virgin Islands	St. Thomas	January 1–4	Holiday vacation.
New York	New York	January 8	Attended DNC receptions at the homes of Jane Rosenthal and Alan Patricof. Visited the Carlyle Hotel.
Texas	Brownsville, McAllen, Mission	January 9	Spoke at Brownsville/South Padre Island International Airport. Stayed at the Embassy Suites hotel in McAllen, where he met with local leaders. Visited Mission High School. Campaigned for Representative Ruben Hinojosa at Alonzo Cantu's home in McAllen, and for Representative Sheila Jackson Lee at the George R. Brown Convention Center.
New York	New York	January 15	Addressed the Wall Street Project Conference at the Windows on the World restaurant atop 1 World Trade Center. Announced a Community Oriented Policing Services grant for New York City in a speech at John F. Kennedy International Airport.
Illinois	Urbana	January 28	Spoke at the University of Illinois' Assembly Hall. During this visit, Air Force One became stuck in mud at University of Illinois Willard Airport, requiring SAM 26000 to be brought in as a backup to transport Clinton.
Wisconsin	La Crosse	January 28	Spoke at the La Crosse Center. This visit was the last time SAM 26000 was used as Air Force One.

== February ==
State or country	Areas visited	Dates	Details
New Mexico	Los Alamos, Albuquerque	February 3	Toured Los Alamos National Laboratory. Visited La Hacienda Restaurant and Cantina in Albuquerque. Spoke at Albuquerque's Civic Plaza.
Virginia	Wintergreen	February 9	Addressed the House Democratic caucus retreat at the Wintergreen Resort.
Pennsylvania	Philadelphia	February 13	Attended a DCCC reception at a private residence.
Maryland	Baltimore	February 19	Toured a local nonprofit, the Living Classroom Foundation, where he announced the Clean Water Action Plan. Attended a DNC luncheon at the Harbor Court Hotel.
New Jersey	Roseland	February 19	Attended a DNC dinner at David Steiner's home.
Florida	Kissimmee	February 25	Surveyed damage from the 1998 Central Florida tornado outbreak at Ponderosa Park Campground and Valencia Community College.
California	San Francisco, Oakland	February 25–26	Attended DNC receptions at the Fairmont San Francisco and Bill Hambrecht's home. Visited the BancAmerica Robertson Stephens 1998 Technology Conference at the Ritz-Carlton hotel. Participated in a roundtable discussion on FEMA's Project Impact at the Scottish Rite Center in Oakland.
Utah	Deer Valley	February 26–28	Stayed at Jeffrey Katzenberg's home.
California	Beverly Hills	February 28	Raised funds for Senator Barbara Boxer at Ronald Burkle's home, where he presented Gene Autry with the Presidential Citizens Medal.

== March ==
State or country	Areas visited	Dates	Details
Utah	Deer Valley	March 1	Stayed at Jeffrey Katzenberg's home.
New York	New York	March 3	Attended a celebration of Time magazine's 75th anniversary at Radio City Music Hall.
Connecticut	Bridgeport, Westport	March 10	Spoke about child care at Housatonic Community-Technical College. Attended a Democratic Business Council luncheon at the Inn at National Hall.
Ohio	Cincinnati	March 10	Attended a Democratic Business Council dinner at Stanley M. Chesley's home.
Nevada	Las Vegas	March 18	Spoke at the Carpenters Joint Apprenticeship Training Center.
Ghana	Accra	March 23	Met with President Jerry Rawlings. Visited a Peace Corps project.
Uganda	Kampala, Kisowera, Mukono Town, Wanyange, Entebbe	March 23–25	Met with President Yoweri Museveni and the Presidents of Ethiopia, Rwanda, Tanzania, Kenya and the Congo.
Rwanda	Kigali	March 25	Met with President Pasteur Bizimungu. Delivered a public address.
South Africa	Cape Town, Johannesburg	March 25–29	Met with President Nelson Mandela. Addressed joint session of Parliament.
Botswana	Gaborone, Kasame	March 29–31	Met with President Quett Masire. Visited Chobe National Park.
Senegal	Dakar, Thiès, Gorée Island	March 31 – April 2	Met with President Abdou Diouf. Visited Senegalese peacekeeping troops. Delivered several public addresses.

== April ==
State or country	Areas visited	Dates	Details
Missouri	Kansas City	April 7	Spoke at a national forum on Social Security at Penn Valley Community College. Toured the American Jazz Museum and Negro Leagues Baseball Museum.
Illinois	Highland Park, Chicago	April 7–8	Attended a Democratic Business Council dinner at a private residence. Stayed at the Hilton Chicago. Spoke about school construction at the Rachel Carson School.
Kentucky	Carrollton	April 9	Spoke about tobacco legislation at Kentuckian Tobacco Warehouse and Carroll County High School.
Texas	Houston	April 14–15	Visited the Johnson Space Center, where he met with the crew of STS-90 as they prepared to launch. Participated in a townhall meeting broadcast live on ESPN, A Conversation with the President, Sports and Race: Running in Place?, at the Wortham Theater Center.
Alabama	Birmingham	April 15	Surveyed damage from the 1998 Oak Grove–Birmingham tornado in the Pratt City and McDonald Chapel areas.
Chile	Santiago	April 16–19	State visit. Attended the 2nd Summit of the Americas.
West Virginia	Harpers Ferry	April 22	Celebrated Earth Day by helping maintain a portion of the Appalachian Trail at Jefferson Rock. Visited John Brown's Fort.
New York	New York	April 28	Attended a DSCC dinner at Shelby Bryan's home.

== May ==
State or country	Areas visited	Dates	Details
California	San Jose, Portola Valley, Palo Alto, Westwood, Beverly Hills, San Fernando	May 1–4	Toured a local business in San Jose, Therma Inc. Golfed at the Stanford University Golf Course. Attended a DNC dinner at a private residence in Portola Valley. Stayed at Steve Jobs' home in Palo Alto. Campaigned for Representative Loretta Sanchez at the Westwood Marquis Hotel. Attended a DCCC dinner at Eli Broad's home in Beverly Hills. Stayed at Ronald Burkle's home in Beverly Hills, where a California Labor Initiative breakfast was held. Launched the Partnership for Advancing Technology in Housing initiative at a construction site in San Fernando.
Illinois	Chicago	May 4	Attended a DSCC dinner at William F. Farley's home.
Delaware	Dover	May 8	Addressed a joint session of the Delaware General Assembly at the Legislative Hall.
Virginia	Williamsburg	May 9	Visited the Senate Democratic Policy Committee annual retreat at Kingsmill Resort.
Massachusetts	Boston	May 9	Attended a DNC dinner at Elaine Schuster's home.
Germany	Berlin, Potsdam, Frankfurt, Eisenach	May 12–14	Met with Chancellor Helmut Kohl. Attended 50th anniversary of the Berlin Airlift.
United Kingdom	Birmingham, Weston-under-Lizard, London	May 14–18	Attended the 24th G8 summit and the US-EU summit meetings.
Switzerland	Geneva	May 18	Attended the WTO meeting commemorating the 50th anniversary of GATT.
Maryland	Annapolis	May 22	Gave the commencement address at the U.S. Naval Academy at Navy–Marine Corps Memorial Stadium.

== June ==
State or country	Areas visited	Dates	Details
Texas	Houston, Dallas	June 2	Toured the Magnolia Multi-Service Center, where he spoke about plans for the 2000 United States Census. Attended a DCCC reception at a private residence in Houston. Visited his former Treasury secretary Lloyd Bentsen in Houston. Visited Rosewood Mansion on Turtle Creek. Attended a DNC dinner at Raymond Nasher's home in Dallas.
Ohio	Cleveland, University Heights	June 3	Toured Stephen E. Howe Elementary School. Attended a City Year convention at John Carroll University. Campaigned for Lee Fisher in the 1998 Ohio gubernatorial election at the Cleveland Play House complex.
Massachusetts	Cambridge, Lincoln	June 5	Gave the commencement address at the Massachusetts Institute of Technology on Killian Court. Spoke at the grand opening of the Thoreau Institute at Walden Woods.
New York	New York	June 8	Addressed the special session of the United Nations General Assembly on the World Drug Problem.
Connecticut	Westport	June 8	Campaigned for Barbara Kennelly in the 1998 Connecticut gubernatorial election at the Martha Stewart Living studio.
New York	New York	June 8	Visited the Waldorf Astoria New York, where he hosted Mexican president Ernesto Zedillo and a DCCC fundraiser.
California	Pacific Grove, Monterey, San Francisco	June 12	Toured the Hopkins Marine Station. Attended the National Oceans Conference at San Carlos Beach in Monterey. Campaigned for Senator Barbara Boxer at the Fairmont San Francisco.
Oregon	Portland, Springfield	June 12–13	Campaigned for Representative Darlene Hooley at the Tiffany Center. Stayed at the Benson Hotel. Gave the commencement address at Portland State University's Rose Garden Arena. Visited Thurston High School, site of a mass shooting three weeks prior.
California	Los Angeles, Beverly Hills	June 13–14	Attended a DNC dinner at Lew Wasserman's home in Los Angeles. Stayed at Ronald Burkle's home in Beverly Hills.
Tennessee	Nashville	June 22	Addressed the Family Re-Union conference at Vanderbilt University's Langford Auditorium.
Alaska	Anchorage	June 24	Stopover at Elmendorf Air Force Base on the way to China.
China	Xi'an, Beijing, Shanghai, Guilin, Hong Kong	June 24 – July 3	State visit. Met with General Secretary of the Chinese Communist Party Jiang Zemin. Visited the Forbidden City and the Great Wall of China. Delivered a speech at Peking University.

== July ==
State or country	Areas visited	Dates	Details
Alaska	Anchorage	July 3	Stopover at Elmendorf Air Force Base while returning from China.
Georgia	Atlanta	July 9	Launched the National Youth Anti-Drug Media Campaign in an event at the Georgia World Congress Center. Attended a DSCC luncheon at the Atlanta Marriott Marquis.
Florida	Daytona Beach, Miami	July 9	Met with first responders who were fighting the 1998 Florida wildfires at the Daytona International Speedway. Attended a DCCC dinner at Sylvester Stallone's home.
Arkansas	Little Rock	July 17–19	Stayed with his mother-in-law, Dorothy Howell Rodham. Addressed the Arkansas State Democratic Committee at the Embassy Suites hotel. Attended an Arkansas Victory '98 dinner at a private residence, and a DSCC dinner at the Robinson Auditorium.
Louisiana	New Orleans	July 19–20	Addressed the American Federation of Teachers convention at the Ernest N. Morial Convention Center. Campaigned for Representative William Jefferson at the Fairmont Hotel. Attended a DNC dinner at Emeril's.
Virginia	Norfolk	July 25	Attended the commissioning ceremony for the USS Harry S. Truman at Naval Station Norfolk.
Colorado	Aspen	July 25–26	Attended DNC receptions at private residences, including that of Fred Baron.
New Mexico	Albuquerque	July 26–27	Participated in a townhall meeting on Social Security at the University of New Mexico's Johnson Gymnasium. Campaigned for Martin Chávez in the 1998 New Mexico gubernatorial election at the Sheraton Uptown Hotel.
North Carolina	West Jefferson, Glendale Springs, Raleigh	July 30	Designated the New River as a American Heritage River. Visited the Glendale Springs Inn for lunch. Campaigned for John Edwards for Senate at the North Carolina State Fairgrounds.
New York	East Hampton, Amagansett	July 31–August 2	Attended DNC receptions at the homes of Bruce Wasserstein, Jonathan Sheffer, Alec Baldwin and Kim Basinger. Stayed at Steven Spielberg's home. Advocated for the Patients' Bill of Rights in a radio address recorded from the Amagansett fire station. Visited the Barefoot Contessa restaurant.

== August ==
State or country	Areas visited	Dates	Details
Kentucky	Louisville	August 10	Advocated for the Patients' Bill of Rights at the Commonwealth Convention Center. Attended a campaign luncheon at the Seelbach Hotel.
Illinois	Chicago	August 10	Attended a Unity '98 dinner at the Chicago Historical Society atrium.
California	San Bruno, San Francisco, Los Angeles	August 10–11	Spoke about safe drinking water at the Harry Tracy Water Treatment Plant in San Bruno. Campaigned for Gray Davis in the 1998 California gubernatorial election at the Westin St. Francis and at the homes of Bruce Karatz and Jeffrey Katzenberg in Los Angeles.
Massachusetts	Martha's Vineyard, Worcester	August 18–20, 21–30	Vacation, staying at Richard L. Friedman's home. Announced Operation Infinite Reach in a press conference from Edgartown Elementary School, and returned to Washington briefly in its immediate aftermath. Announced expansion of the Police Corps program in a speech at Mechanics Hall.

== September ==
State or country	Areas visited	Dates	Details
Russia	Moscow	September 1–3	Summit meeting with President Boris Yeltsin.
United Kingdom	Belfast, Armagh, Omagh	September 3	Met with Prime Minister Tony Blair and Northern Irish political leaders. Addressed the Northern Ireland Assembly.
Ireland	Dublin, Adare, Limerick, Ballybunion	September 3–5	Met with Taoiseach Bertie Ahern. Delivered several public addresses and played golf.
Florida	Orlando, Coral Gables	September 9	Spoke about school safety at Hillcrest Elementary School in Orlando. Attended Florida Democratic Party receptions at the Marriott Downtown Orlando and the Miami Biltmore Hotel.
New York	New York	September 14	Addressed the Council on Foreign Relations at the Harold Pratt House. Attended a Unity '98 luncheon at Denise Eisenberg Rich's home. Visited the Waldorf Astoria New York, where he presented the Presidential Medal of Freedom to Zachary Fisher. Attended a performance of The Lion King at the New Amsterdam Theatre.
Ohio	Cincinnati	September 17	Attended a DCCC luncheon at Stanley M. Chesley's home. Visited Findlay Market.
Massachusetts	Boston	September 17	Attended a Unity '98 dinner at the Boston Park Plaza Hotel & Towers.
New York	New York	September 20–22	Attended the opening of the 53rd United Nations General Assembly at United Nations Headquarters. Stayed at the Waldorf Astoria. Took questions at the "Strengthening Democracy in the Global Economy" conference at the New York University School of Law.
Illinois	Chicago	September 25	Spoke at Edward Jenner Elementary School. Campaigned for Representative Glenn Poshard and Mary Lou Kearns at the Chicago Mercantile Exchange.
California	San Jose, Palo Alto, Rancho Santa Fe, Los Angeles	September 25–27	Recorded a radio address from the Fairmont San Jose. Attended a DNC dinner at the Tech Museum of Innovation. Stayed at Steve Jobs' home in Palo Alto. Attended a DNC luncheon at William Lerach's home in Rancho Santa Fe, and a Unity '98 dinner at Haim Saban's home in Los Angeles. Stayed at Ronald Burkle's home in Beverly Hills.
Texas	San Antonio, Houston	September 27	Campaigned for Garry Mauro in the 1998 Texas gubernatorial election at private residences in both cities.

== October ==
State or country	Areas visited	Dates	Details
Ohio	Cleveland	October 2	Visited a local business, Kathleen's Kitchen. Campaigned for Mary O. Boyle for Senate at a private residence.
Pennsylvania	Philadelphia	October 2	Visited the Zanzibar Blue jazz club. Recorded a radio address about the Emergency Farm Financial Relief Act from the Wyndham Franklin Plaza Hotel. Attended a DNC reception at Philadelphia City Hall.
New York	New York	October 12	Campaigned for Peter Vallone Sr. in the 1998 New York gubernatorial election at the Waldorf Astoria, and for Chuck Schumer for Senate at the New York Hilton Midtown and at Steven Rattner's home. Attended a G&P Charitable Foundation for Cancer Research gala benefit at the Sheraton New York Times Square Hotel.
Maryland	Queenstown	October 15, 17, 18, 19, 20, 22–23	Traveled repeatedly back and forth to the Wye River Conference on the Middle East at the Aspen Institute Wye River Conference Centers.
Illinois	Chicago	October 16	Campaigned for Senator Carol Moseley Braun at the Union League Club of Chicago. Met with religious leaders at the Chicago Hilton and Towers.
California	Los Angeles, San Francisco	October 24–25	Campaigned for Janice Hahn for Congress at Roz Wyman's home, and for Senator Barbara Boxer at the homes of James L. Brooks and Carole Bayer Sager in Los Angeles and at the Mark Hopkins Hotel. Stayed at Walter Shorenstein's home in San Francisco.
Florida	Cape Canaveral, Palm Beach	October 29	Watched the launch of STS-95, the Space Shuttle mission carrying Senator John Glenn, from John F. Kennedy Space Center. While at Kennedy Space Center, presented the Presidential Medal of Freedom to Dante Fascell, and signed legislation to rename the visitor center at Biscayne National Park after Fascell. Campaigned for Representative Peter Deutsch, and for Buddy MacKay in the 1998 Florida gubernatorial election, at the Palm Beach Biltmore.
New York	New York	October 30	Spoke about Social Security at the St. Sebastian Roman Catholic Church Parish Center. Campaigned for Chuck Schumer at Joe Cayre's home. Met with African American church leaders and campaigned with them for State Comptroller H. Carl McCall at the Ramada Plaza JFK Hotel.

== November ==
State or country	Areas visited	Dates	Details
Maryland	Baltimore	November 1	Attended a Sunday service at New Psalmist Baptist Church with Representative Elijah Cummings, where he sat down for an interview with April Ryan for American Urban Radio Networks.
Arkansas	Highfill	November 6	Attended the grand opening and dedication ceremony for Northwest Arkansas National Airport.
Japan	Tokyo	November 19–20	Met with Emperor Akihito and Prime Minister Keiz? Obuchi. Addressed American Chamber of Commerce.
South Korea	Seoul, Osan	November 20–22	Met with President Kim Dae-jung. Addressed U.S. military personnel. Visited Guam during his return to attend a World War II wreath-laying ceremony.
Guam	Hagåtña	November 23	Met with Micronesian leaders at Government House. Visited War in the Pacific National Historical Park. Spoke at the Ricardo J. Bordallo Governor's Complex.

== December ==
State or country	Areas visited	Dates	Details
Rhode Island	Newport	December 3	Toured the Bliss Mine Road Water Treatment Plant. Spoke about federal protections for drinking water at Fort Adams State Park.
Arkansas	Wynne	December 5	Attended the funeral of William Maurice Smith Jr., who had been his chief of staff as Governor of Arkansas, at Wynne Presbyterian Church.
Tennessee	Nashville	December 8	Attended the funeral of former senator Albert Gore Sr., father of Clinton's vice president Al Gore, at the War Memorial Building.
Israel	Jerusalem, Masada	December 12–15	Met with Prime Minister Benjamin Netanyahu and senior Israeli officials.
Palestinian National Authority	Gaza, Bethlehem, Erez	December 14–15	Addressed Palestine National Council. Attended a meeting with Prime Minister Benjamin Netanyahu and Chairman Yasser Arafat.
Maryland	Baltimore	December 23	Announced a Housing and Urban Development grant to increase homelessness assistance at the local Boys & Girls Club.
South Carolina	Hilton Head	December 30–January 1	Stayed at Tony Brown's home. Attended a Renaissance Weekend Institute New Year's Eve dinner at the Hyatt Regency hotel.
