= Todd General Store =

- U.S. Historic district – Contributing property
- Location within North Carolina Location within the United States
- Location: 3866 Railroad Grade Road, Todd, North Carolina, 28684
- Coordinates: 36°18′32″N 81°35′51″W
- Part of: Todd Historic District (ID00000017)
- Designated CP: January 28, 2000

The Todd General Store is located 10 miles south of West Jefferson and 11 miles north of Boone, off Hwy 194, overlooking the South Fork of the New River, and on Railroad Grade Road, one of the most scenic bike routes in North Carolina.

The Todd General Store is a contributing property in the Todd Historic District, which is listed in the National Register of Historic Places.

According to Kirk Carrison of Preservation North Carolina, the Todd General Store is one of only five or six authentic general stores remaining in North Carolina. The Todd General Store is the oldest operating store in Ashe County and remains "the gathering place" for local residents where stories of days past are still swapped, relationships are built, and community spirit nourished.

Todd General Store suffered heavy damage from a fire that broke out on the evening of February 25, 2021.

== The Past ==
Established in 1914, The Todd General Store (originally Cook Brothers General Store) was built by Walter and Monroe Cook in anticipation of the arrival of the Norfolk and Western "Virginia Creeper" railroad. Todd was the end of the line, the last of 13 stops for the train, which traveled from Abingdon, VA, to Todd's Elkland station twice a day.

Todd General Store carried a wide variety of general merchandise, clothing, shoes, hardware, food, feed, dried foraged herbs, and farm implements. Most of the items the store sold were brought in by train. It was one of nine stores that served a growing community that also included four doctors, a dentist, a Ford garage, a bank, grist mill, drug store, post office, train depot and four churches.

=== W.G. Cook Store ===
Walter bought out his brother's interest in 1917 and continued to operate the business as W.G. Cook Store. At that time most of the trade was conducted on the barter system, as money was scarce and almost non-existent in Todd prior to the arrival of the railroad. Ledgers were kept containing what was owed and what was traded. Customers would trade chickens, roots and herbs and other items of value for merchandise or receive "W.G. Cook" tokens that were only redeemable at this store. Many of the bartered items would then go to Virginia on the train.

The General Store was the center of the community and served all the shopping needs of the local residents. Customers would gather around the wood cookstove to swap stories and catch up on the town news. Most customers either rode horseback or walked. Only a select few could afford automobiles and the few roads that existed were full of potholes.

=== The Lean Years ===
The Norfolk & Western pulled up its tracks from Todd to West Jefferson between 1933 and 1936. This was also the time of the Great Depression and Todd's businesses begun to close one by one. The W.G. Cook Store was the only store that survived through those lean years. Cook was the store's proprietor for 43 years before selling it to Kenny Goodman, who then changed the name to Goodman's Grocery.

=== Goodmans Grocery ===
Kenny Goodman ran a thriving general store business for some 20 years. During the last years of his tenure, he began to see the decline of the traditional general store. Automobiles became common place, new and better roads were built and chain grocery stores and department stores were constructed in Boone and West Jefferson. With this new accessibility to the outside world people began traveling to town to buy their goods. Mr. Goodman decided to sell the store that had been the center of trade for so many years.

=== Three More Owners ===
The store changed ownership four times during the next eight years. Goodman sold the store to Bob Peet who changed the name to the Todd General Store. Peet was unable to keep up with the changing demands and business declined. Peet sold it to Al and Carol Shelly who ran it for a couple of years before selling it to Dennis and Alice Dent, who operated it for another couple of years. During the proprietorship of these three owners, the stock was depleted as the decline of the rural country general store continued.

=== The Morgans ===
Joe and Sheila Morgan purchased the Todd General Store at the beginning of 1985 and operated the store for the next 17 years.

In the first few months, the Morgans undertook needed structural repairs to the building, constructed bathrooms, brought in running water, put in an extensive septic system, and built a parking lot. They searched for replacement fixtures and advertising memorabilia in an attempt to recapture the look of the General Store as it had been in its heyday. Advertising was done throughout the region to attract visitors to the store hoping that their visits would add an economic base to allow the business to remain open year-round to serve the local community's needs.

=== The Mann's Store ===
Robert and Virginia Mann purchased the store at the start of 2002 and provided more structural repairs and updated the store's arrangements, providing more seating for audiences of the store's many musical and cultural events, an internet station, and adding a new wooden deck to the back of the store. The store was closed in 2016.

== The Cook House ==
The W.G. Cook house (built in 1916) served as the residence of the store owners until the Morgan purchase. In 1986, the house was converted to use as retail space offering antiques, crafts and collectibles. In 1994, the house was again converted into a rental residential property until December 2000.

== 2021 Fire ==
On the evening of February 25, 2021, Todd General Store was heavily damaged by a fire that occurred around 9:45 pm EST.
