= Ola Belle Reed =

American singer-songwriter (1916–2002)

- Born: Ola Wave Campbell; August 18, 1916; Grassy Creek, North Carolina, U.S.
- Died: August 16, 2002 (aged 85)
- Occupations: Singer-songwriter banjo player

Ola Belle Reed (August 18, 1916 – August 16, 2002) was an American Appalachian folk singer, songwriter and banjo player.

== Early life ==
Reed was born Ola Wave Campbell in the unincorporated town of Grassy Creek, Ashe County, North Carolina. She was the fourth of thirteen children.

As a young child, Reed learned the clawhammer-style banjo and with her musical family sang old-time songs from the mountain region where they lived. Several family members on both sides of her family played instruments and sang. Reed's paternal grandfather, Alexander Campbell, played the fiddle. Her father played several instruments including the fiddle, banjo, guitar, and organ. Her uncle, Dockery Campbell, is credited with teaching Reed the clawhammer style. On her mother's side, family member Bob Ingraham taught singing schools and her uncle Herb Osborne was versed in mining songs. Reed learned ballads and songs from her mother and grandmother.

== Career ==
When she was a teenager, Reed's family moved to Southern Pennsylvania. In the mid-1930s, Reed joined The North Carolina Ridge Runners. She later formed the band, The New River Boys and Girls, with her brother, Alex Campbell, which went on to open the New River Ranch in Rising Sun, Maryland, a music park that hosted many well known performers until being destroyed in 1958. They went on to be the "house band" and broadcast live shows at another music park called Sunset Park in West Grove, Pennsylvania.

Reed's songs often speak of Appalachian life and traditions. Her best-known songs have been recorded by mainstream bluegrass and country artists. "High on a Mountain" has been recorded by Del McCoury, Tim O'Brien, and Marty Stuart; "I've Endured" has been recorded by Del McCoury as well as Tim O'Brien. The New York-based folk music group Ollabelle is named after Reed.

The annual Ola Belle Reed Music Festival in Lansing, North Carolina, celebrates her life and music.

== Honors ==
- 1978: University of Maryland, Honorary doctorate
- 1986: NEA National Heritage Fellowship
- 1988: Distinguished Achievement Award, International Bluegrass Music Association (IBMA), first woman so honored ( https://ibma.org/awards-by-year/ )
- 2019: The Library of Congress selected her 1973 album Ola Belle Reed to be added to the National Recording Registry

== Personal life ==
In 1949, Reed married Ralph "Bud" Reed. They had two sons, Ralph and David. She had a stroke in 1987 that left her unable to continue to perform music. She died on August 16, 2002.

== Releases ==
In 2010, Smithsonian Folkways released Rising Sun Melodies, a collection of 11 songs that appeared on her previous Folkways recordings, plus eight previously unreleased tracks that were recorded at the Smithsonian Folklife Festival in the 1970s. Among the musicians accompanying her on the album were her brother Alex Campbell, her husband Bud Reed, her son Dave Reed, and the husband and wife team of John Coffey and Betsy Rutherford.

In January 2011, Ola Belle Reed's Rising Sun Melodies won The 10th Annual Independent Music Awards in the Reissue category.

Her song "High on a Mountain" was sung by the character Mags Bennett on the TV series Justified. The same song was used in a dramatic scene in the penultimate episode of Fargo, season 4.

On August 21, 2015, Dust-to-Digital released the hardcover book / 2-CD set Ola Belle Reed and Southern Mountain Music on the Mason-Dixon Line by Henry Glassie, Clifford Murphy and Douglas Dowling Peach.

== Discography ==
- 1962: Sixteen Radio Requests Favorites (Starday Records)
- 1963: Bluegrass Spectacular (Starday Records)
- 1965: Travel On (Starday Records)
- 1972: Ola Belle Reed (Rounder Records)
- 1973: Country Bluegrass Jamboree (Madbag)
- 1976: My Epitaph (Folkways Records)
- 1978: Ola Belle & Bud Reed, All in One Evening (Folkways Records)
- 1978: The Old-Time Banjo in America (Kicking Mule)
- 1978: Ola Belle Reed & Family (Rounder Records)
