= Crumpler, North Carolina =

Unincorporated community in North Carolina, U.S.

Crumpler
- Unincorporated community
- Location within the state of North Carolina
- Coordinates: 36°30′14″N 81°23′39″W
- Country: United States
- State: North Carolina
- County: Ashe
- Named for: Thomas N. Crumpler

Population
  - Estimate (2023): 1,469
- Time zone: UTC-5 (EST)
  - Summer (DST): UTC-4 (EDT)
- ZIP Code: 28617
- Area codes: 336, 743

Crumpler is an unincorporated community in Ashe County, North Carolina, United States.

== Geography ==
Crumpler is located in northeastern Ashe County, south of Grassy Creek. The community lies at an elevation of 2,559 feet (780 m).

The North Fork of the New River flows through Crumpler.

The ZIP Code for Crumpler is 28617.

== Population ==
In 2023, the population estimate for ZIP Code 28617 was 1,469.

== Transportation ==
North Carolina Highway 16 is the primary route in the community, providing access to the eastern areas of Ashe County.

== History ==
Historical evidence shows that the area that comprises present-day Crumpler was inhabited by several Native Americans tribes, including the Cherokee, Muscogee, and Shawnee. Arrowheads and broken pottery have been found in the area, confirming their presence.

Crumpler is named for Thomas N. Crumpler (1831–1862), a lawyer and North Carolina state representative. Representative Crumpler was known for his controversial remarks regarding an amendment proposal to the North Carolina constitution to allow Jewish people to hold public office. He argued that Jews should not be trusted and would threaten the state if allowed to hold public office. Despite the commonness of slavery and overt systematic racism of the time period, Crumpler faced intense backlash across North Carolina for his comments. Initially one of the most prominent pro-Union voices of the state, Crumpler joined the Confederate Army in 1861, when North Carolina declared its secession from the Union. He was later shot and killed in the Battle of Glendale, reportedly while charging a Union soldier on horseback.

The following locations in Crumpler are listed on the National Register of Historic Places:

- John M. Pierce House
- Thompson's Bromine and Arsenic Springs
- Shubal V. Alexander Archeological District
- Brinegar District

== 2008 White House Christmas Tree ==
In 2008, an 18 ½-foot tall Fraser fir sourced from River Ridge Farms in Crumpler was selected as the White House Christmas tree. It was the third White House Christmas tree sourced from Ashe County during the presidency of George W. Bush.

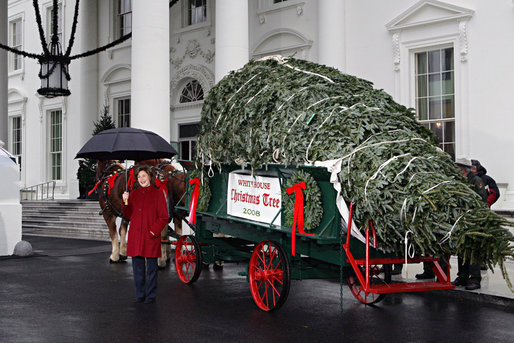
The 2008 White House Christmas tree, sourced from River Ridge Farms in Crumpler

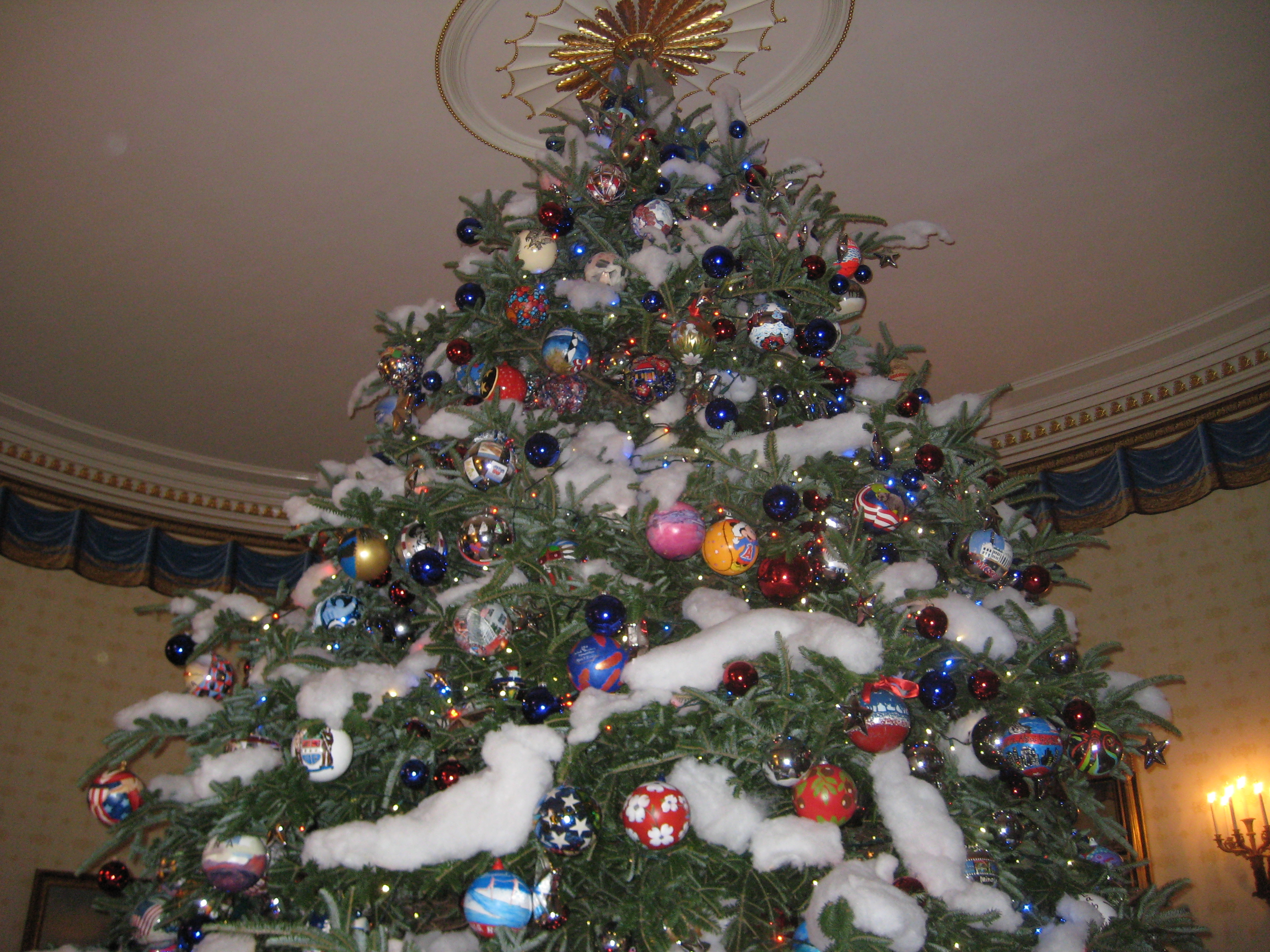
The 2008 White House Christmas tree in the Blue Room
