= Lansing, North Carolina =

- Town
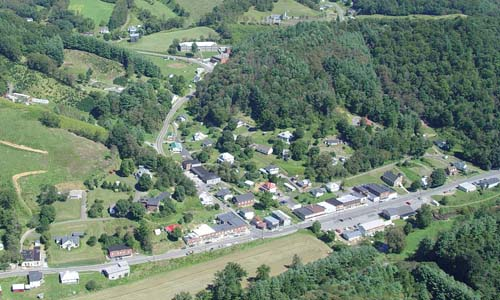
- Aerial Photo of Lansing

- Seal

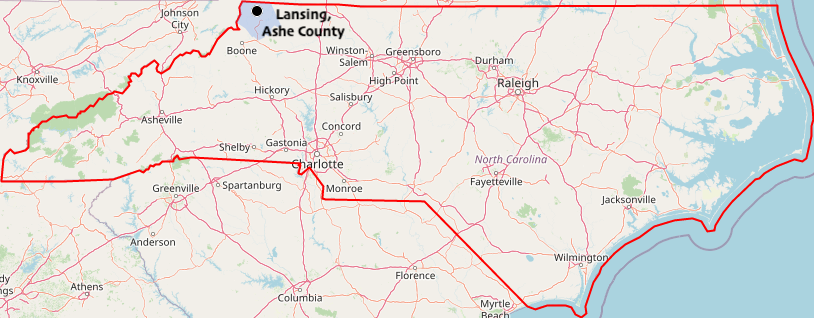
- Location of Lansing, North Carolina
- Coordinates: 36°29′57″N 81°30′38″W
- Country: United States
- State: North Carolina
- County: Ashe

Area
  - Total: 0.38 sq mi (0.98 km^{2})
  - Land: 0.37 sq mi (0.96 km^{2})
  - Water: 0.0077 sq mi (0.02 km^{2})
- Elevation: 2,654 ft (809 m)

Population (2020)
  - Total: 126
  - Estimate (2023): 222
  - Density: 340.9/sq mi (131.63/km^{2})
- Time zone: UTC-5 (Eastern (EST))
  - Summer (DST): UTC-4 (EDT)
- ZIP code: 28643
- Area codes: 336, 743
- FIPS code: 37-36960
- GNIS feature ID: 2405986
- Website: www.lansingnc.us

Lansing is a resort town in Ashe County, North Carolina, United States. The population was 126 at the 2020 census.

Lansing is a popular destination among retirees and tourists from Florida, as well as those from the lower elevations of the Carolinas and Georgia.

== History ==
The town of Lansing was incorporated May 16, 1928. Lansing has one stop sign, a single three-way intersection at NC 194 and Big Horse Creek Road.

In the early 20th century, Lansing was a prosperous community, primarily because of the Norfolk and Western Railroad Company, whose daily mixed train, nicknamed the "Virginia Creeper", stopped here. Todd, West Jefferson, White Oak, and other towns in North Carolina were also regular stopping places for the train. There were some productive iron mines around Lansing that used the railroad to move ore.

In the 1930s and 1940s, Lansing was home to one of two cheese factories in Ashe County. Lansing's cheese plant offered local farmers a place to bring their goods instead of traveling to the county's other cheese plant in West Jefferson.

Lansing High School was built in 1941 by the Works Progress Administration (WPA) using local granite stone.

The Clark-Miller Roller Mill, Lansing Historic District, Lansing School, Miller Homestead, and Perry-Shepherd Farm are listed on the National Register of Historic Places.

== Geography ==
According to the United States Census Bureau, the town has a total area of 0.35 square miles (0.9 km^{2}), of which 0.0077 square miles (0.02 km^{2}), or 2.18%, is water.

== Demographics ==
Historical population
| Census | Pop. | Note | %± |
|---|---|---|---|
| 1960 | 278 | | — |
| 1970 | 283 | | 1.8% |
| 1980 | 194 | | −31.4% |
| 1990 | 171 | | −11.9% |
| 2000 | 151 | | −11.7% |
| 2010 | 158 | | 4.6% |
| 2020 | 126 | | −20.3% |
| 2021 (est.) | 127 | ▲ | 0.8% |
U.S. Decennial Census

=== 2000 census ===
Downtown Lansing during a hailstorm in March 2007

As of the census of 2000, there were 151 people, 69 households, and 38 families residing in the town. The population density was 396.9 inhabitants per square mile (153.2/km^{2}). There were 83 housing units at an average density of 218.2 per square mile (84.2/km^{2}). The racial makeup of the town was 100.00% White.

There were 69 households, out of which 27.5% had children under the age of 18 living with them, 36.2% were married couples living together, 17.4% had a female householder with no husband present, and 43.5% were non-families. 42.0% of all households were made up of individuals, and 26.1% had someone living alone who was 65 years of age or older. The average household size was 2.19 and the average family size was 3.03.

In the town, the population was spread out, with 24.5% under the age of 18, 8.6% from 18 to 24, 27.8% from 25 to 44, 17.9% from 45 to 64, and 21.2% who were 65 years of age or older. The median age was 37 years. For every 100 females, there were 75.6 males. For every 100 females age 18 and over, there were 72.7 males.

The median income for a household in the town was $18,125, and the median income for a family was $26,563. Males had a median income of $21,250 versus $18,571 for females. The per capita income for the town was $11,560. There were 9.8% of families and 17.3% of the population living below the poverty line, including 31.0% of under eighteens and 23.9% of those over 64.

=== 2023 American Community Survey ===
In 2023, the American Community Survey released several demographic estimations for Lansing. The population estimate was 222. There were 99 households, with an estimated average of 2.2 persons per household. The community had 130 housing units. The estimated median age was 48.1. The estimated median household income was $49,083. An estimated 5.4% of the population was below the poverty line.
