= Betsy Rutherford =

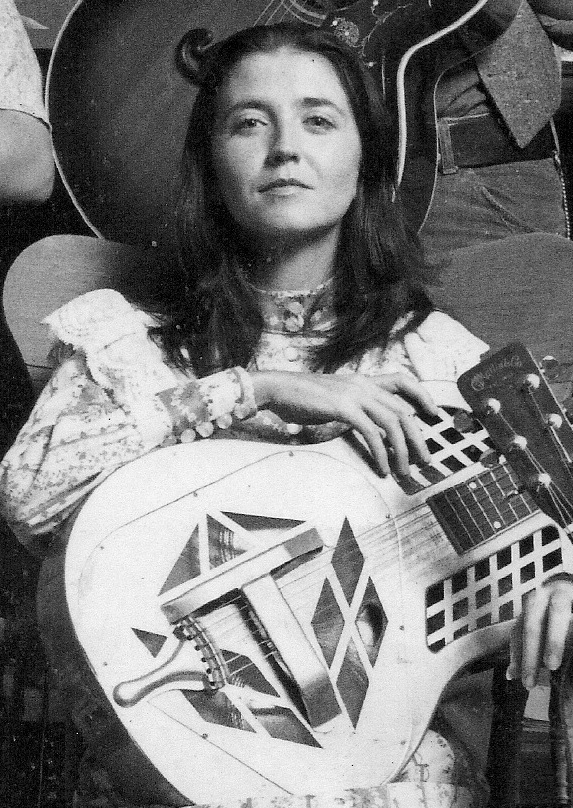
- Betsy Rutherford

Background information
- Born: Levera Elizabeth Wroten; February 11, 1944
- Origin: Galax, Virginia, United States
- Died: March 12, 1991 (aged 47) Galax, Virginia, United States
- Genres: Old-Time; Country
- Occupation: singer
- Instruments: Vocals, guitar, autoharp
- Years active: 1970s–1980s
- Label: Biograph
- Formerly of: New Ruby Tonic Entertainers

Betsy Rutherford (February 11, 1944 in Galax, Virginia – March 12, 1991 in Galax) was a performer of traditional music from the Appalachian Mountains who was known for her powerful, authentic singing style. In 1970, she recorded an album, "Traditional Country Music," which was released by Biograph Records in 1971. For the album, she selected songs that she had collected, mostly from friends and relatives.

== Biography ==
Betsy Rutherford was raised in a musical family. She was related to acclaimed Galax-area musicians and early recording artists Fields, Crockett and Wade Ward, and Henry Whitter.

Her father, Clarence Wroten, was a singer and string band musician who performed with the Ruby Tonic Entertainers and had radio shows in Charlotte, Winston-Salem and Greensboro, North Carolina, in the 1930s. Her mother, Lola Montgomery Wroten, was a shape-note singer. According to Betsy Rutherford, "Mom sang hymns; Daddy sang traditional string band music and played either his guitar, autoharp, or mouth-harp. Somebody was singing just about all the time."

Although she was born in Galax, Betsy Rutherford grew up in the Baltimore area. She recorded her album, "Traditional Country Music," with string band musicians who were associated with Old Joe Clark's, a music cooperative in Cambridge, Massachusetts. On December 17, 1971, she married John Coffey, a certified nurse anesthetist and string band musician, who accompanied her on the album and wrote the liner notes.

On November 20, 1971, the album received a favorable mention in Billboard Magazine, which said that the record "showed a definite non-Nashville approach and would appeal to folk enthusiasts as well."

She continued to perform during the next two decades, including a stint with the New Ruby Tonic Entertainers, named after her father's band. She performed frequently at colleges and music festivals, including the annual Smithsonian Folklife Festival in Washington, D.C. She concluded every performance with a rendition of "Amazing Grace," which she lined out in the Primitive Baptist tradition.

She can be heard singing harmony vocals on "Rising Sun Melodies," a compilation of Ola Belle Reed songs released in 2010 by Smithsonian Folkways Recordings.

Betsy Rutherford died at Galax Community Hospital on March 12, 1991. She was 47 years old. Survivors included her husband and three daughters. She is buried at Felts Memorial Cemetery in Galax.

== Discography ==
=== Solo album ===
- 1971, Traditional Country Music, Biograph RC-6004

Track Listing

1. Faded Coat of Blue
2. Rain and Snow
3. John Hardy
4. The West Virginia Mine Disaster
5. Tramp on The Street
6. Boys, Be Good to Dear Old Dad
7. Drunkard's Doom
8. Blue
9. Will the Circle Be Unbroken?
10. Amazing Grace

=== As a Guest Singer ===
- 2010, Ola Belle Reed, "Rising Sun Melodies," Smithsonian Folkways Recordings No. 40202
