= Bower-Cox House =

Historic house in North Carolina, United States

- U.S. National Register of Historic Places
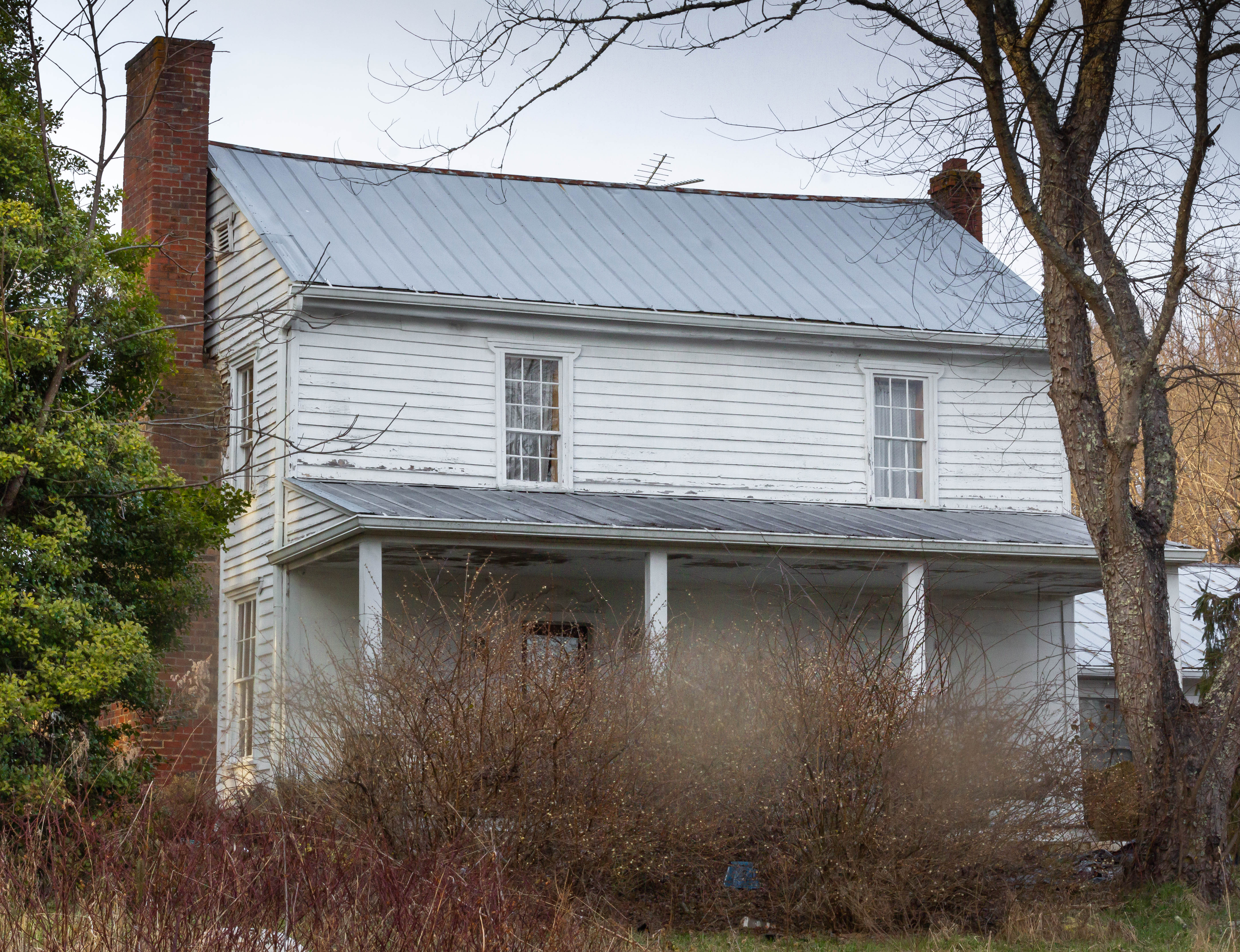

- Location within North Carolina Location within the United States
- Location: SW of Scottville on SR 1595, near Scottville, North Carolina
- Coordinates: 36°26′43″N 81°21′52″W
- Area: 8 acres (3.2 ha)
- Built: c. 1820
- Architect: George Bower
- Architectural style: Late Victorian, Federal, Late Federal
- NRHP reference No.: 76001303
- Added to NRHP: November 7, 1976

Bower-Cox House is a historic house located on SR 1595 southwest of Scottville, Ashe County, North Carolina. It is locally significant for its association with its builder and owners.

== Description and history ==
The original section was built about 1820, and is a two-story, Late Federal style block with a one-story shed-roof porch. A Late Victorian addition, now regarded as the "front" of the house, is a two-story frame block with a one-story shed-roof porch on one side and a two-story porch on the opposite.

It was listed on the National Register of Historic Places on November 7, 1976.
