= Clark-Miller Roller Mill =

- U.S. National Register of Historic Places
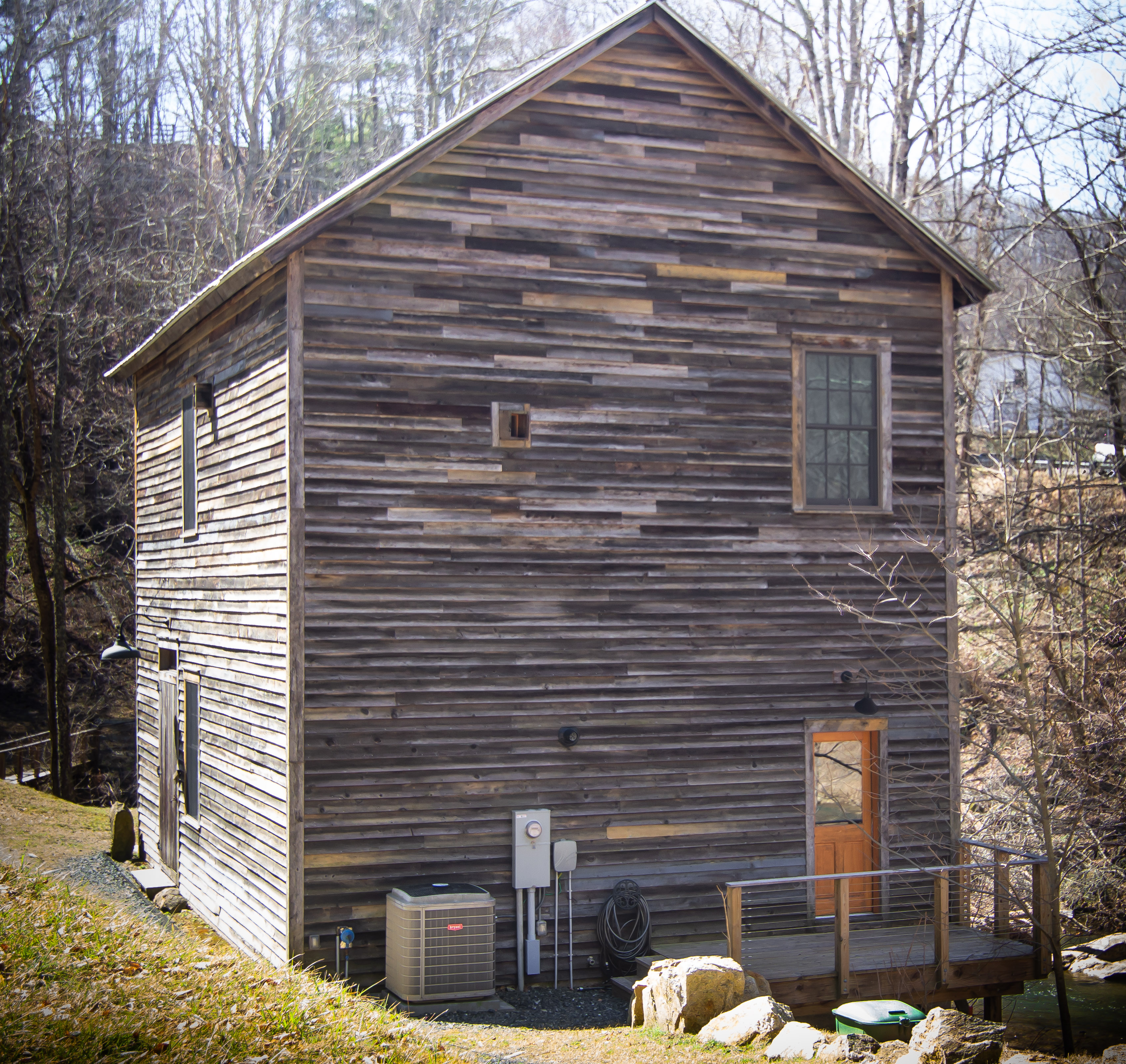

- Location within North Carolina Location within the United States
- Location: 180 Long Branch Rd., near Lansing, North Carolina
- Coordinates: 36°30′23″N 81°31′17″W
- Area: 1.868 acres (0.756 ha)
- Built: c. 1915
- NRHP reference No.: 14000491
- Added to NRHP: August 19, 2014

Clark-Miller Roller Mill, also known as the Davis-Clark Roller Mill and W.M. Miller Roller Mill, is a historic roller mill located near Lansing, Ashe County, North Carolina. It was built about 1915, and is a two- to three-story, banked frame with weatherboard siding and a metal roof. It rests on a poured concrete foundation and has a side-gabled roof. The building houses an Anglo-American (Midget) Marvel brand roller mill.

It was listed on the National Register of Historic Places in 2014.
