= Scottville, North Carolina =

Unincorporated community in North Carolina, US

Coordinates: 36°28′49″N 81°18′27″W

Scottville (formerly Flint Hill) is an unincorporated community in both Ashe and Alleghany counties, North Carolina, United States, on U.S. Route 221. It lies at an elevation of 2,854 feet (870 m). The ZIP Code for Scottville is 28672.

The Bower-Cox House and Samuel Cox House are listed on the National Register of Historic Places.
