= A.S. Cooper Farm =

Historic farm in North Carolina, United States

- U.S. National Register of Historic Places
- U.S. Historic district
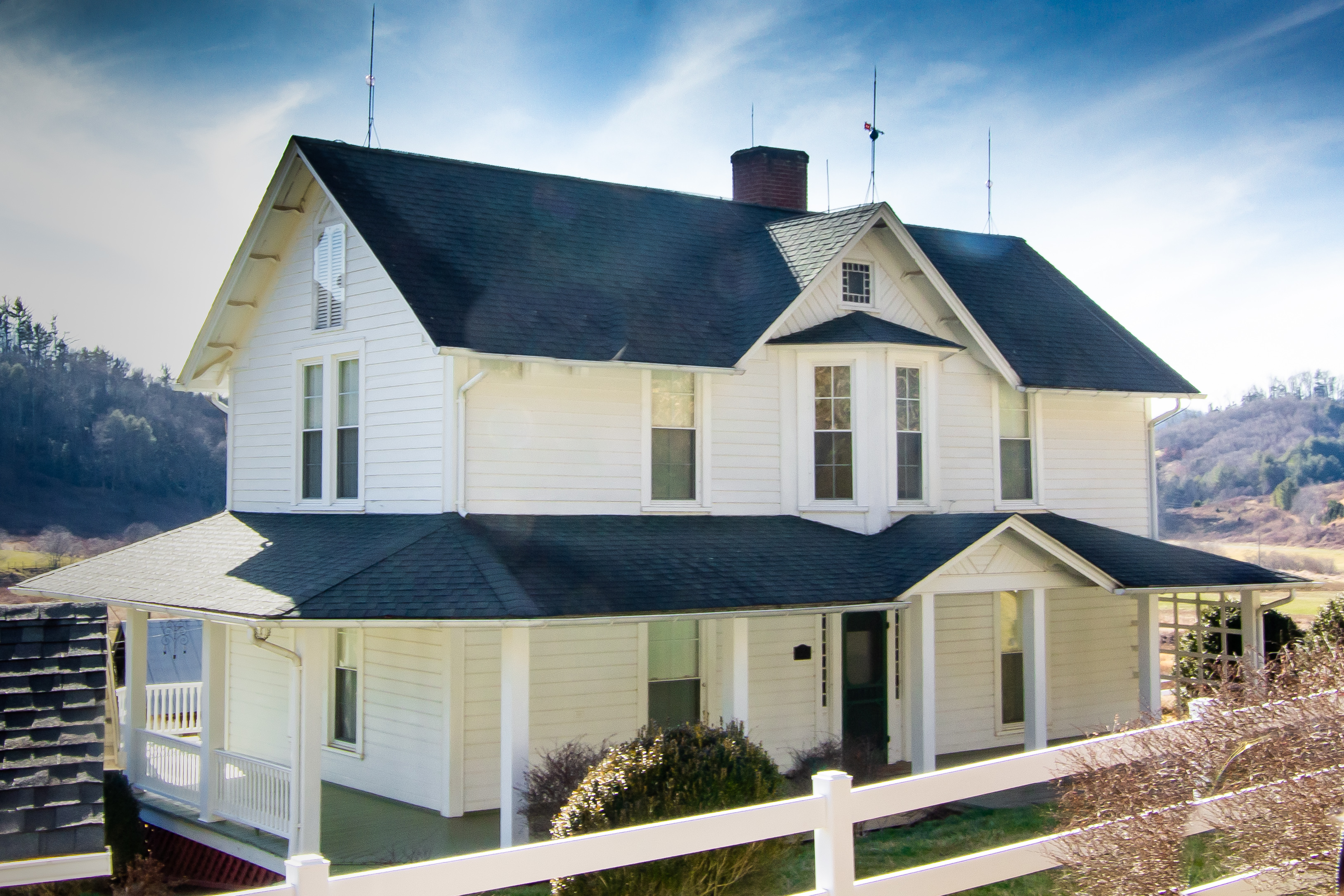

- Location within North Carolina Location within the United States
- Location: Cranberry Springs Rd., approx. 0.2 miles SE of jct. with Todd Railroad Grade Rd. (3124 Cranberry Springs Rd.), Brownwood, Ashe County, North Carolina
- Coordinates: 36°16′33″N 81°32′56″W
- Area: 180 acres (73 ha)
- Built: c. 1880
- Built by: Cooper, A.S.
- Architectural style: I-house
- NRHP reference No.: 01001028
- Added to NRHP: September 24, 2001

A.S. Cooper Farm is a historic farm complex and national historic district located near Brownwood, Ashe County, North Carolina. The district encompasses 13 contributing buildings, 2 contributing sites, and 1 contributing structure. They are located in three primary clusters on the farm. The A.S. Cooper, Sr. cluster includes the A.S. Cooper, Sr. House (c. 1890), spring house (c. 1890), tool shed / wood shed (c. 1890, c. 1925), chicken coop (c. 1939), granary (c. 1890), and garage (1934). The second cluster is the barn / milking parlor (1908, 1946, c. 1980), and silo (c. 1947) complex. The third cluster includes the Albert Sidney Cooper, Jr. House (1918), small shed (c. 1918), kitchen building, shed (c. 1940), spring house (c. 1880), and barn. Associated with the complex is the family cemetery and agricultural landscape.

It was listed on the National Register of Historic Places in 2001.
