= John M. Pierce House =

Historic house in North Carolina, United States

- U.S. National Register of Historic Places
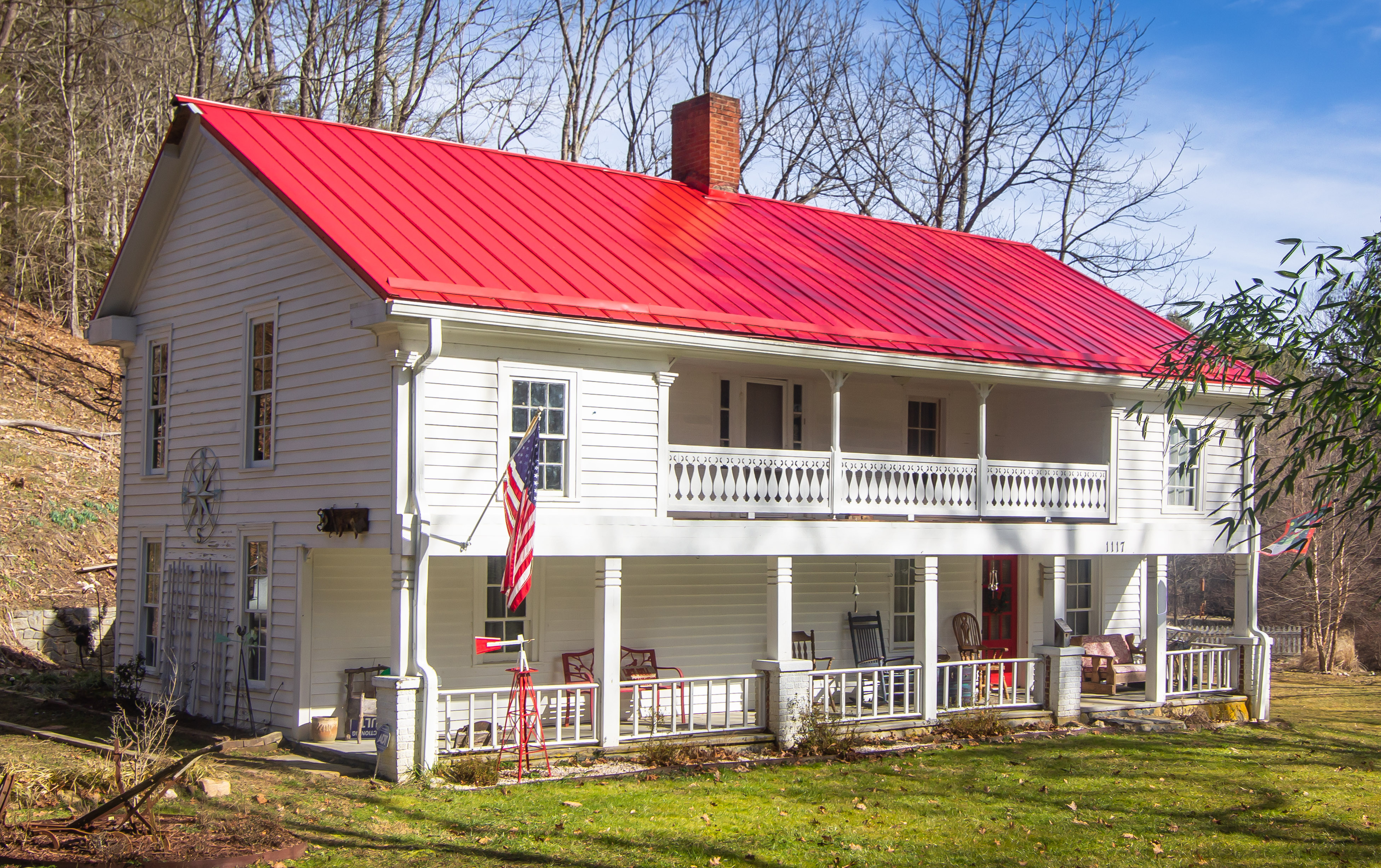

- Location within North Carolina Location within the United States
- Location: N of Crumpler on SR 1559, near Crumpler, North Carolina
- Coordinates: 36°31′52″N 81°20′58″W
- Area: 6 acres (2.4 ha)
- Built: c. 1871, c. 1881, 1892
- Architect: Multiple
- Architectural style: Log construction
- NRHP reference No.: 76001298
- Added to NRHP: November 7, 1976

John M. Pierce House is a historic home located near Crumpler, Ashe County, North Carolina. The original log section was built about 1871. A one-story frame ell was added to the rear about 1881, and in 1892, the log house was raised to a full two stories and a large two-story addition was built. The front facade features a two-story engaged porch. Also on the property is a contributing barn (c. 1883).

It was listed on the National Register of Historic Places in 1976.
