= Lansing School =

Historic school building in North Carolina, United States

- U.S. National Register of Historic Places
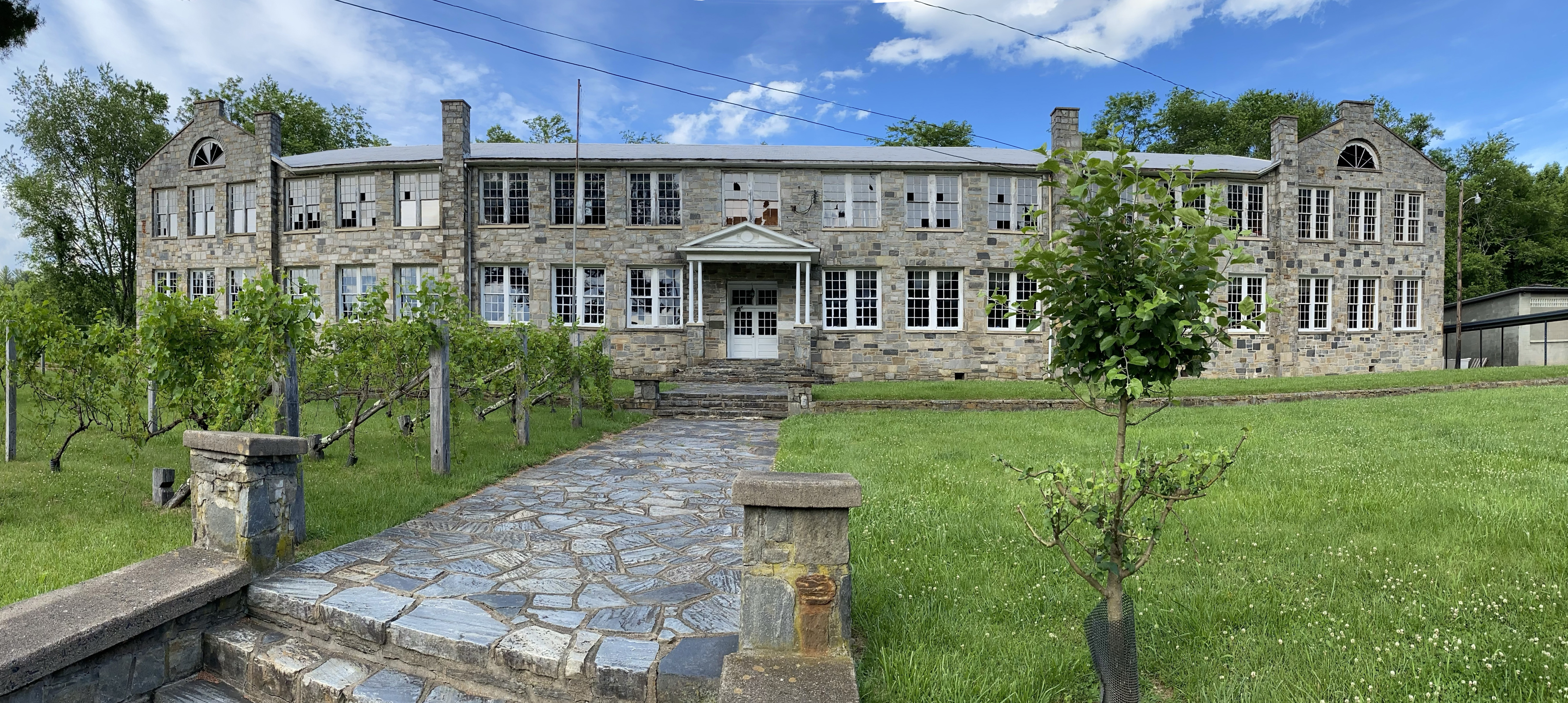

- Location within North Carolina Location within the United States
- Location: E. side of NC 194 at jct. with NC 1517, Lansing, North Carolina
- Coordinates: 36°30′2″N 81°30′20″W
- Area: 3.9 acres (1.6 ha)
- Built: 1938
- Built by: Baldwin, W.C.
- Architectural style: Colonial Revival
- NRHP reference No.: 08001288
- Added to NRHP: January 8, 2009

Lansing School is a historic school building located at Lansing, Ashe County, North Carolina. It was built in 1937-1938 by the Works Progress Administration, and is a two-story, 19 bay wide, building constructed of random coursed native granite blocks. The building features modest Colonial Revival style details. The building has a standing seam metal hipped roof with small gabled attic dormers. Also on the property is a two-story, four-bay, brick building built in 1952-53 to serve as high school classrooms.

In 2020, the Lansing School was purchased by Lost Province Center for Cultural Arts (LPCCA), a nonprofit organization whose mission is "to bridge the urban-rural divide, revitalize our community and promote the cultural arts and skills of the Southern Appalachian region." LPCCA will focus on preserving and teaching three aspects of Southern Appalachian culture: arts and crafts, culinary arts, and music. The organization plans to restore the historic property to provide a spacious venue for classes, special events, sustainable multi‐use housing, a signature farm-to‐table restaurant and a showcase gallery, along with boutique apartments that can be rented by students, teachers, and tourists alike.

It was listed on the National Register of Historic Places in 2009.
