= Samuel Cox House =

Historic house in North Carolina, United States

- U.S. National Register of Historic Places
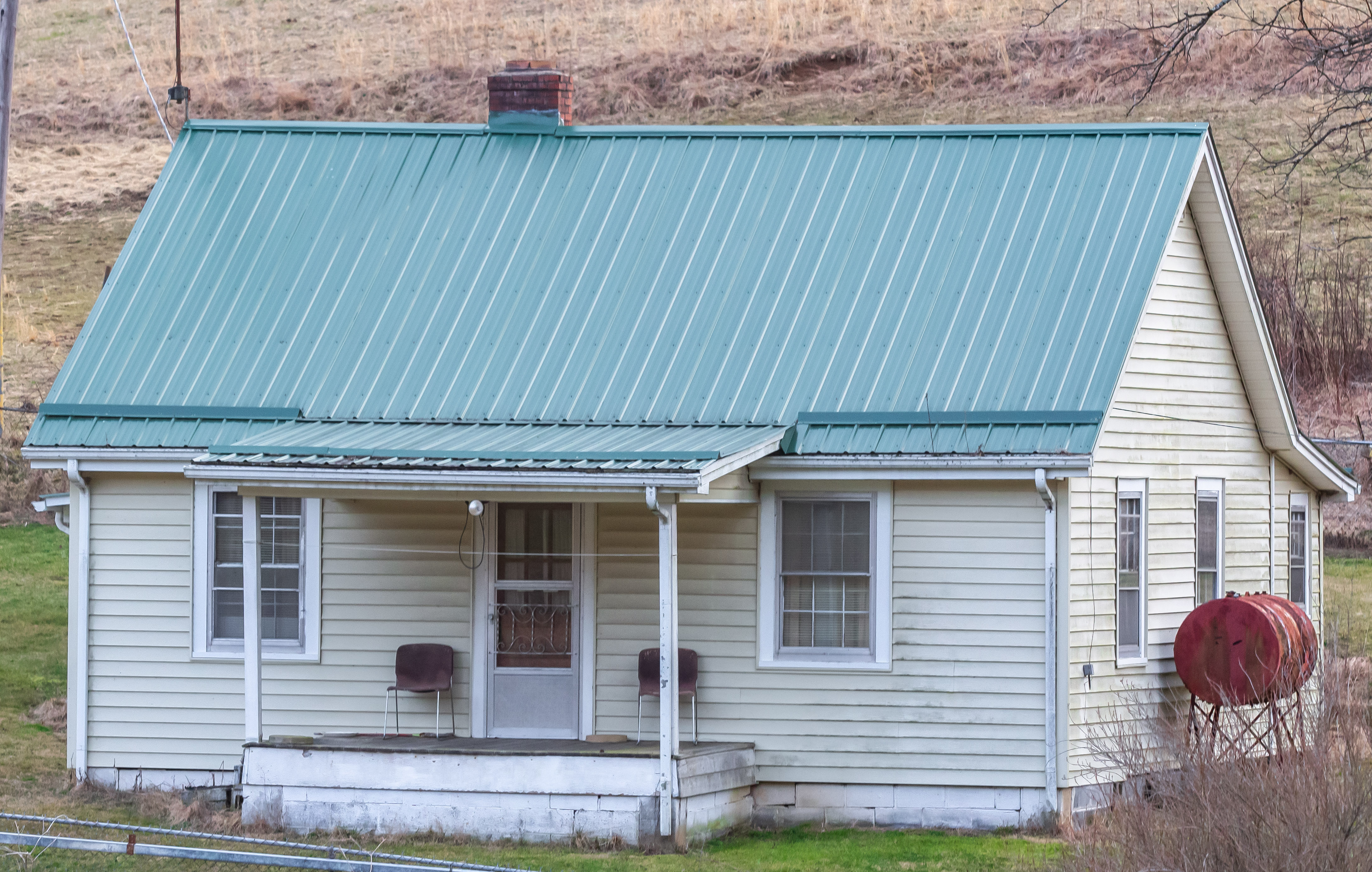

- Location within North Carolina Location within the United States
- Location: SW of Scottville off U.S. 221 on SR 1636, near Scottville, Ashe County, North Carolina
- Coordinates: 36°28′28″N 81°18′51″W
- Area: 5 acres (2.0 ha)
- Architectural style: Log construction
- NRHP reference No.: 76001304
- Added to NRHP: November 7, 1976

The Samuel Cox House is a historic house located near Scottville, Ashe County, North Carolina. It is a "T"-plan dwelling consisting of a two-story log, gable roof, main section built in the mid-19th century, with a later one-story frame ell and frame addition on the east side of the ell. The log section was covered with weatherboards about 1880. The front facade features a one-story, full-width shed-roof porch.

It was listed on the National Register of Historic Places on November 7, 1976.
