= Todd Historic District =

Historic district in North Carolina, United States

- U.S. National Register of Historic Places
- U.S. Historic district
- Location within North Carolina Location within the United States
- Location: Along Todd Railroad Grade Rd., Big Hill Rd., and Carter Miller Rd., Todd, North Carolina
- Coordinates: 36°18′32″N 81°35′51″W
- Area: 19 acres (7.7 ha)
- Built: 1915
- Architectural style: Bungalow/Craftsman, Late Victorian
- NRHP reference No.: 00000017
- Added to NRHP: January 28, 2000

The Todd Historic District is a 19-acre (7.7 ha) national historic district located at Todd, Ashe County, North Carolina. It encompasses 24 contributing buildings and one other contributing site in the rural community of Todd. It includes commercial and residential structures, a church, and a hotel. Located in the district is the Todd General Store.

It was listed on the National Register of Historic Places in 2000.
