= West Jefferson Historic District =

Historic district in North Carolina, United States

- U.S. National Register of Historic Places
- U.S. Historic district
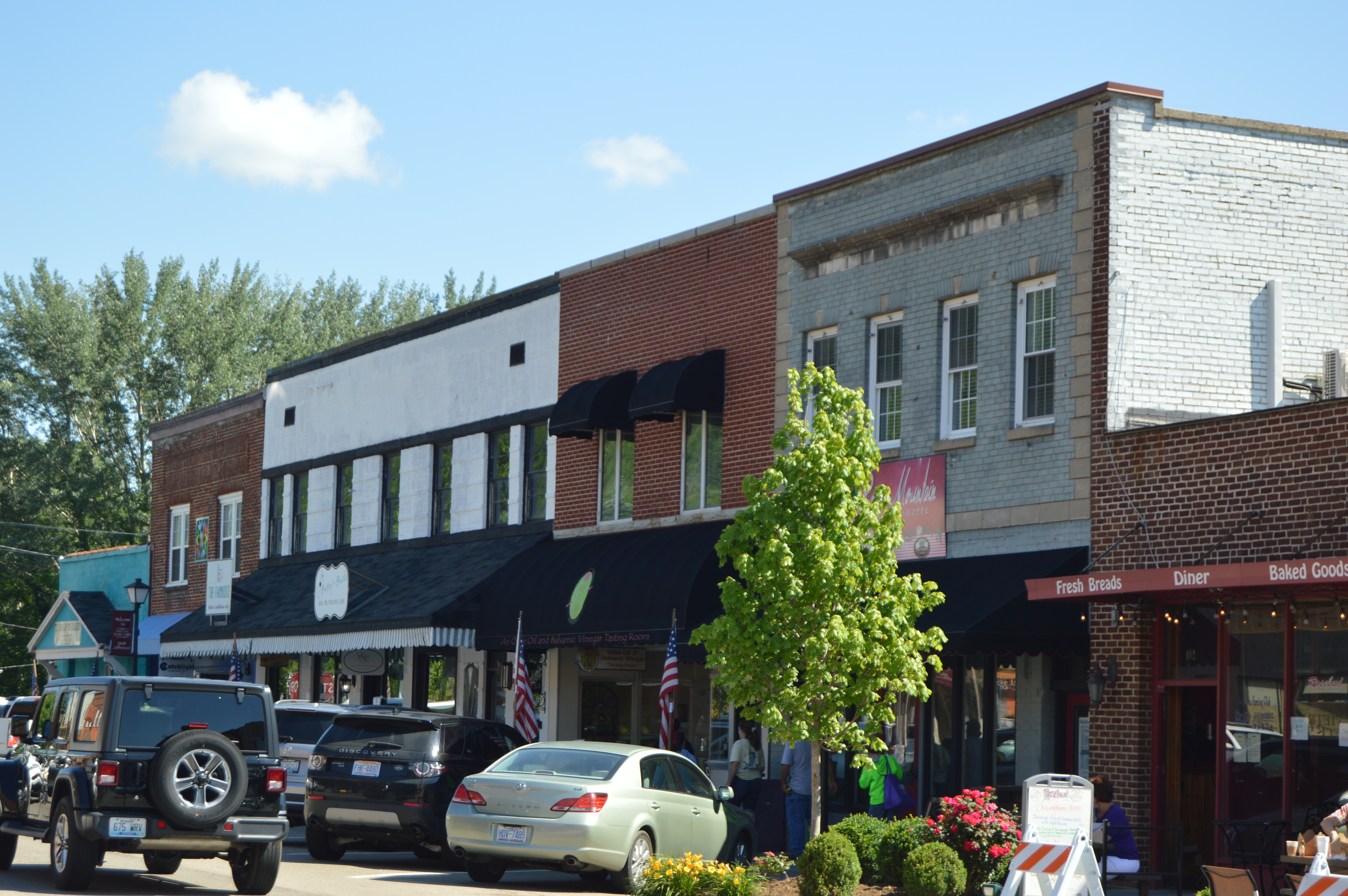
- Jefferson Avenue north of First Street

- Location within North Carolina Location within the United States
- Location: Roughly bounded by State St., 3rd Ave., 2nd St.& Wilton Ave., West Jefferson, North Carolina
- Coordinates: 36°24′7″N 81°29′32″W
- Area: 40 acres (16 ha)
- Architectural style: Colonial Revival, Classical Revival, et al.
- NRHP reference No.: 07001076
- Added to NRHP: October 5, 2007

West Jefferson Historic District is a national historic district located at West Jefferson, Ashe County, North Carolina. The district encompasses 50 contributing buildings in the central business district of West Jefferson. The district primarily includes one-story and two-story commercial buildings dating to the early- to mid-20th century. Notable buildings include the West Jefferson Hotel (1917), Graybeal's Rexall Drugstore Building (c. 1950), Parkway Theater (1939), Dr. Pepper Bottling Company building (c. 1940), First Baptist Church (1929), Benjamin Cornett House, and West Jefferson Depot.

It was listed on the National Register of Historic Places in 2007.
