= Perry–Shepherd Farm =

Historic house in North Carolina, United States

- U.S. National Register of Historic Places
- Location within North Carolina Location within the United States
- Location: 410 Swansie Shepherd Rd., near Lansing, North Carolina
- Coordinates: 36°30′34″N 81°33′55″W
- Area: 62 acres (25 ha)
- Built: c. 1890
- Architectural style: Late Victorian
- NRHP reference No.: 06000289
- Added to NRHP: April 19, 2006

Perry–Shepherd Farm, also known as the Swansie Shepherd Farm, is a historic home and farm complex located near Lansing, Ashe County, North Carolina. The complex includes the main dwelling, a caretaker's cottage, a barn, a warehouse, a granary, and three sheds surrounded by woodland, open pasture, and blueberry and apple orchards. The main house was built about 1890, and is a two-story, single-pile I-house with an original rear wing. It has a double-porch and Queen Anne style decorative elements.

It was listed on the National Register of Historic Places in 2006.
