= Grassy Creek Historic District =

Historic farm in North Carolina, United States

- U.S. National Register of Historic Places
- U.S. Historic district
- Location within North Carolina Location within the United States
- Location: SR 1535 and SR 1573, Grassy Creek, North Carolina
- Coordinates: 36°33′53″N 81°23′08″W
- Area: 725 acres (293 ha)
- Built: 1915
- Architect: Multiple
- Architectural style: Mixed (more Than 2 Styles From Different Periods)
- NRHP reference No.: 76001300
- Added to NRHP: December 12, 1976

Grassy Creek Historic District is a national historic district located near Grassy Creek, Ashe County, North Carolina. The district encompasses 38 contributing buildings and 27 contributing structures in the small agricultural community of Grassy Creek. They include farmhouses and related agricultural outbuildings related to the Greer family, early settlers of Grassy Creek. The oldest building is the Aquilla Greer House (c. 1812 – 1817). Located in the district is the Grassy Creek Methodist Church (1904).

It was listed on the National Register of Historic Places in 1976.
