= Lansing Historic District =

Historic district in North Carolina, United States

- U.S. National Register of Historic Places
- U.S. Historic district
- Location within North Carolina Location within the United States
- Location: Roughly bounded by NC 194, G & A Sts., Lansing, North Carolina
- Coordinates: 36°29′59″N 81°30′39″W
- Area: 32 acres (13 ha)
- Built by: Greer, Drew; Ham, Troy; and Mullis, Dan
- Architectural style: Colonial Revival,
- NRHP reference No.: 11000544
- Added to NRHP: August 18, 2011

Lansing Historic District is a national historic district located at Lansing, Ashe County, North Carolina. The district encompasses 62 contributing buildings in the town of Lansing. The district includes commercial, residential, and institutional buildings dating to the early- to mid-20th century. Notable buildings include the Bank of Lansing (c. 1916), French Young Barber Shop Building (c. 1920), Sapp Department Store (c. 1955), Lansing Mill Company mill (c. 1940), Coble Dairy Plant (c. 1942), Lansing Presbyterian Church (1928), Lansing United Methodist Church (1944), French Young House (c. 1930), and Sapp House (c. 1950).

It was listed on the National Register of Historic Places in 2011.
