= Elkland School Gymnasium =

Historic school building in North Carolina, United States

- U.S. National Register of Historic Places
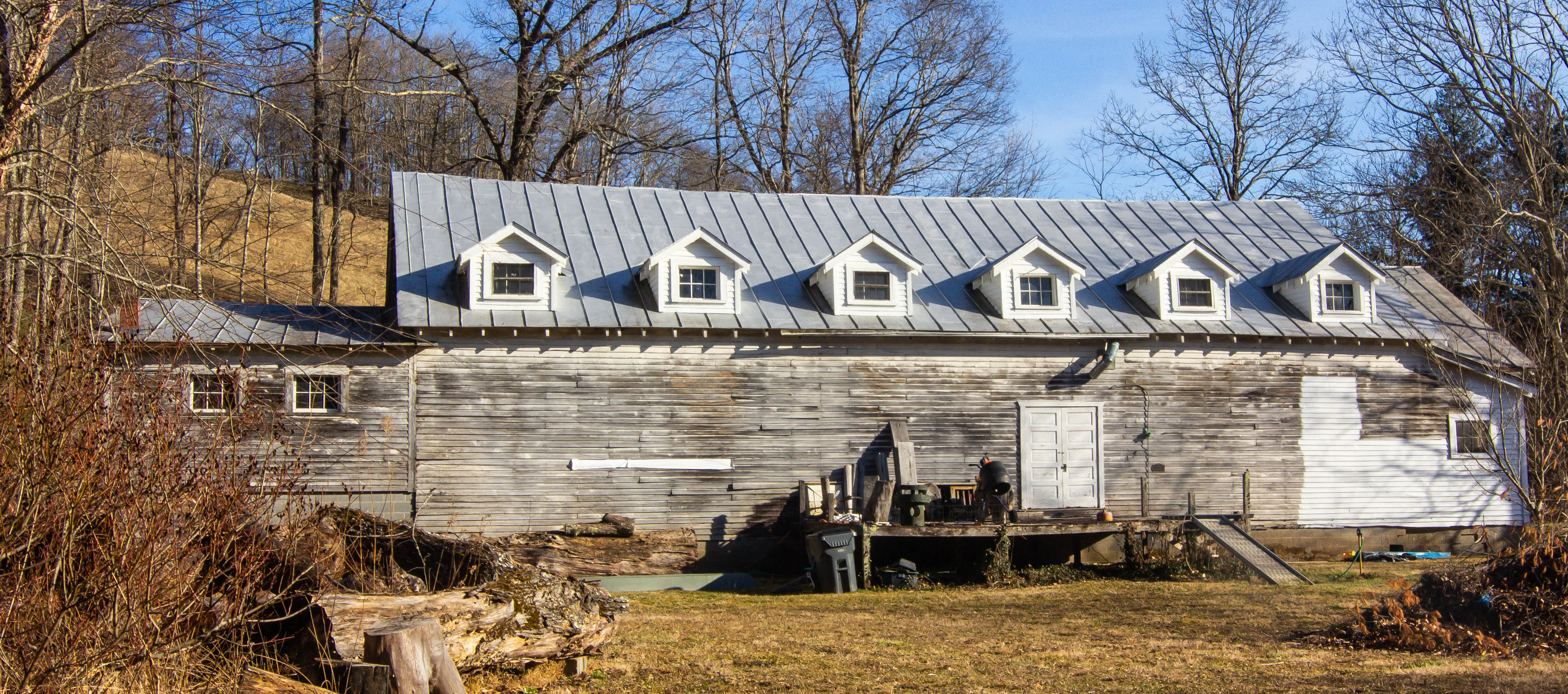

- Location within North Carolina Location within the United States
- Location: 10279 Three Top Rd., NC 1100 at jct. of NC 194, Todd, Ashe County, North Carolina
- Coordinates: 36°18′55″N 81°36′0″W
- Area: 2.7 acres (1.1 ha)
- Built: 1934
- Architect: N.C. Emergency Relief Administration
- NRHP reference No.: 04000646
- Added to NRHP: June 22, 2004

Elkland School Gymnasium is a historic gym located at Todd, Ashe County, North Carolina. It was built in 1934 by the N.C. Emergency Relief Administration, and consists of a 1 1/2-story, gable-roof center section with a one-story, gable-roofed entrance pavilion. The interior features exposed system of elegant scissor trusses that support the roof structure.

It was listed on the National Register of Historic Places in 2004.
