= William Waddell House =

Historic house in North Carolina, United States

- U.S. National Register of Historic Places
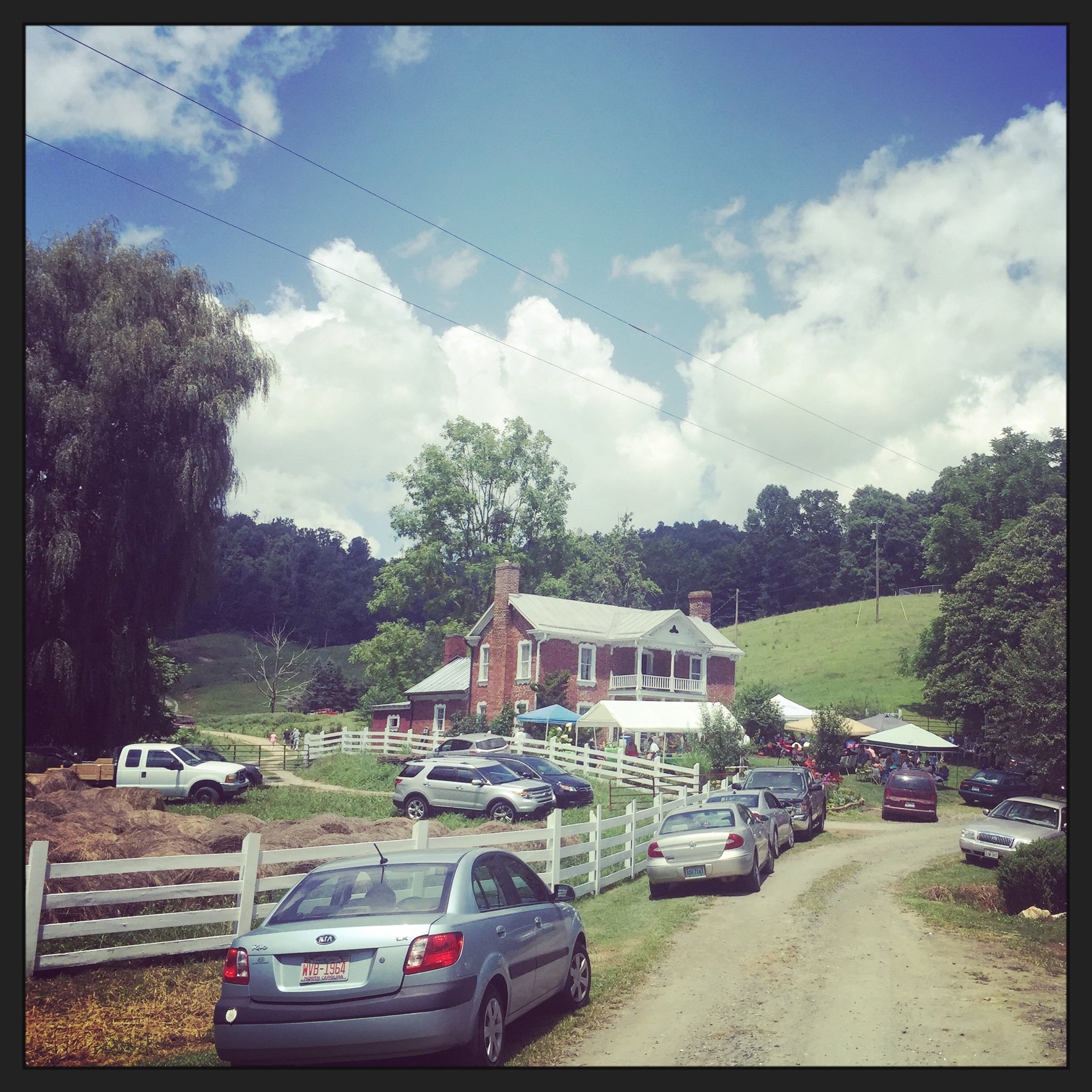

- Location within North Carolina Location within the United States
- Location: West of Grassy Creek off NC 16 on State Route 1532, near Grassy Creek, North Carolina
- Coordinates: 36°34′9″N 81°26′17″W
- Area: 6 acres (2.4 ha)
- Built: c. 1820-1830
- NRHP reference No.: 76001301
- Added to NRHP: November 7, 1976

William Waddell House is a historic home located near Grassy Creek, Ashe County, North Carolina. It was built between 1820 and 1830, and is a two-story, three-bay, "L" plan brick dwelling with a one-story ell. The interior was restored after a fire about 1868–1871. Also on the property is a contributing log granary (c. 1875) and family cemetery.

It was listed on the National Register of Historic Places in 1976.
