= John W. Tucker House =

Historic house in North Carolina, United States

- U.S. National Register of Historic Places
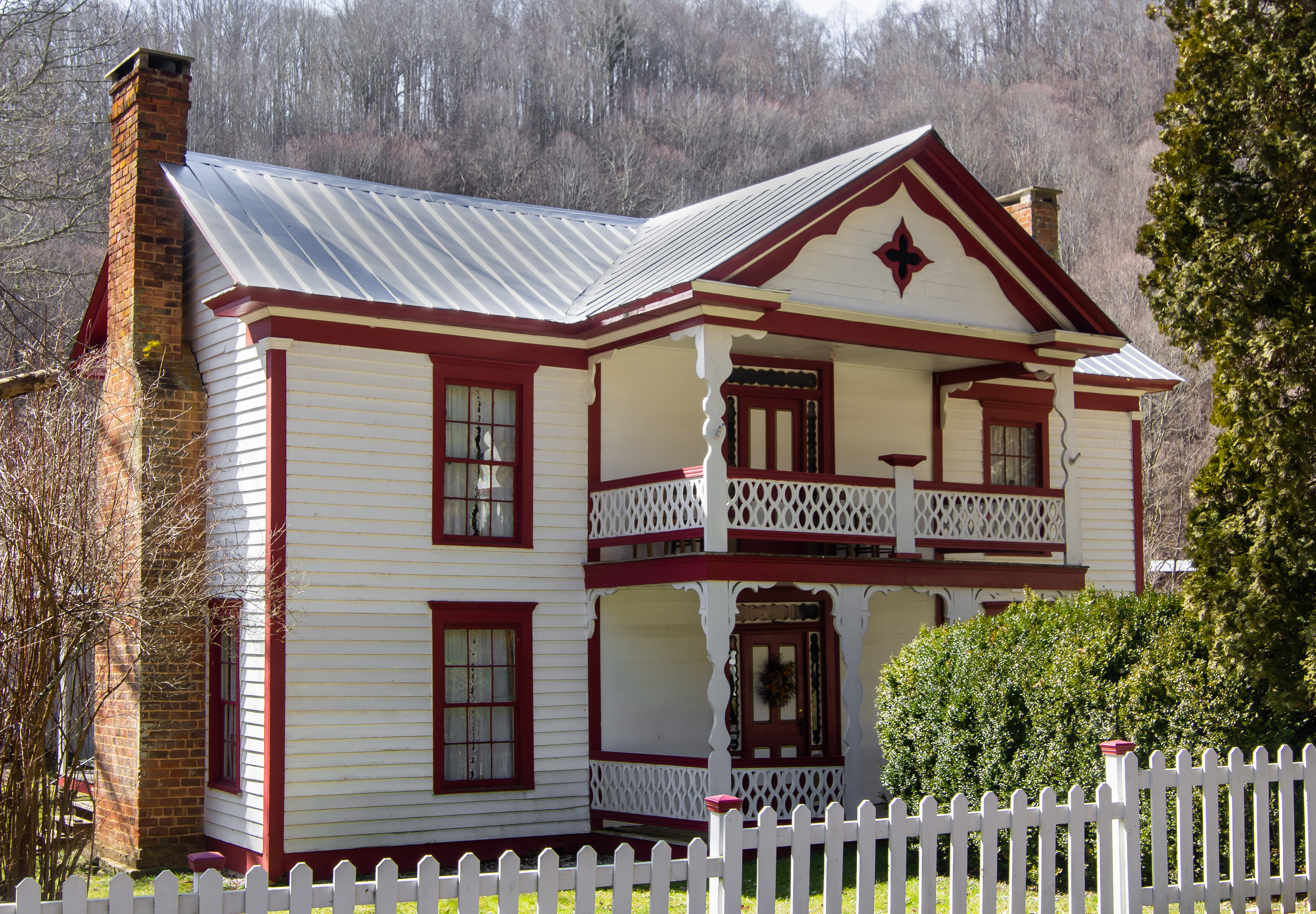

- Location within North Carolina Location within the United States
- Location: State Route 1353, near Tuckerdale, North Carolina
- Coordinates: 36°31′16″N 81°33′09″W
- Area: 50 acres (20 ha)
- Built: c. 1883
- Architectural style: Greek Revival, Italianate
- NRHP reference No.: 85001685
- Added to NRHP: July 29, 1985

John W. Tucker House is a historic home located near Tuckerdale, Ashe County, North Carolina. It was built about 1883, and is a two-story, "T"-plan frame farmhouse with Greek Revival and Italianate style influences. The front facade features a two-tier porch. The house was restored in 1984.

It was listed on the National Register of Historic Places in 1985.
