= Thompson's Bromine and Arsenic Springs =

Historic district in North Carolina, United States

- U.S. National Register of Historic Places
- U.S. Historic district
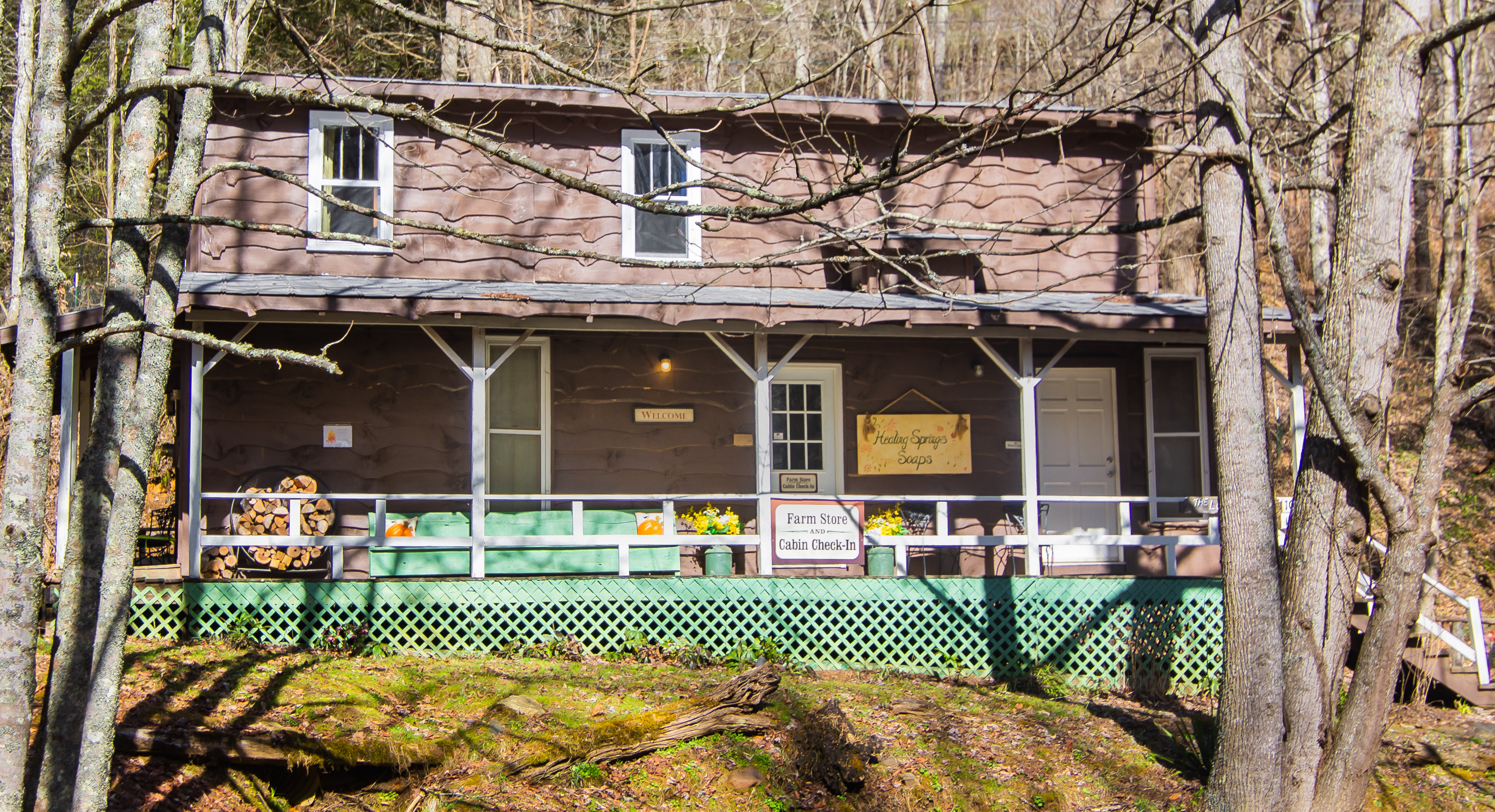

- Location within North Carolina Location within the United States
- Location: W of Crumpler on SR 1542, near Crumpler, North Carolina
- Coordinates: 36°30′8″N 81°23′45″W
- Area: 8 acres (3.2 ha)
- Built: c. 1887, c. 1900, c. 1920
- Architect: Multiple
- NRHP reference No.: 76001299
- Added to NRHP: October 22, 1976

Thompson's Bromine and Arsenic Springs, also known as Healing Springs, is a historic mineral spring resort and national historic district located near Crumpler, Ashe County, North Carolina. The district encompasses 10 contributing buildings and 1 contributing site. They include the octagonal plan spring house and frame double cabin (c. 1900), frame bath house, a long frame cabin structure, 5 cabins (c. 1920), and a double cabin (c. 1930). The Bromine-Arsenic Springs Hotel was constructed in 1887 and burned to the ground in 1962; its former location is considered an archaeological site.

It was listed on the National Register of Historic Places in 1976.
