= R. T. Greer and Company Root and Herb Warehouse =

- R.T. Greer and Company Root and Herb Warehouse
- U.S. National Register of Historic Places
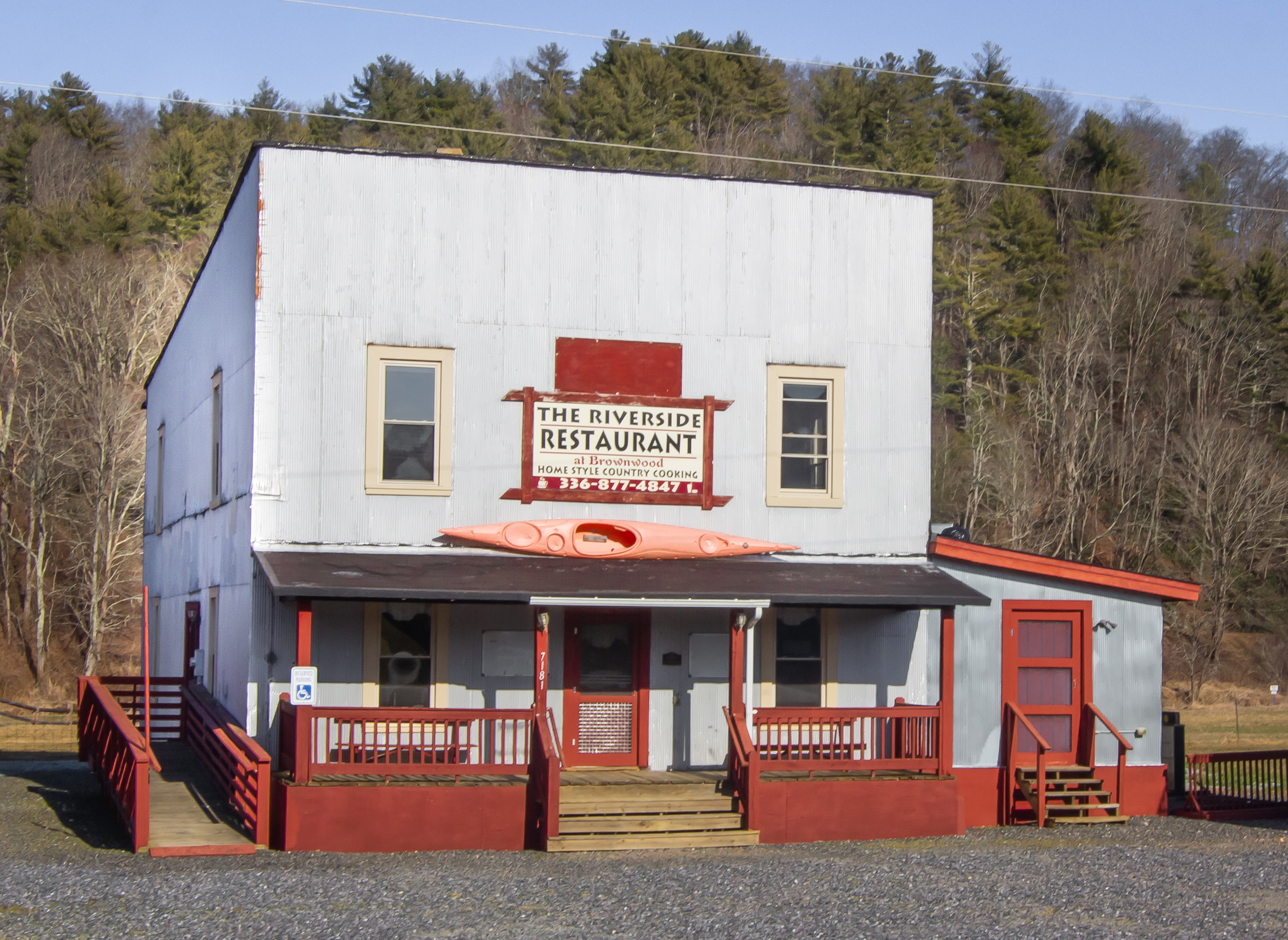

- Location within North Carolina Location within the United States
- Location: 7181 Railroad Grade Rd., jct. of Todd Railroad Grad Rd. at Cranberry Springs Rd., near Todd, North Carolina
- Coordinates: 36°16′43″N 81°33′14″W
- Area: less than one acre
- Built: c. 1918
- NRHP reference No.: 03000269
- Added to NRHP: April 18, 2003

R. T. Greer and Company Root and Herb Warehouse was a historic warehouse located near Todd, Ashe County, North Carolina. It was built about 1918, and was a two-story, rectangular, timber framed commercial building. It was sheathed in corrugated metal sheet siding and rested on a brick pier foundation.

It was listed on the National Register of Historic Places in 2003.

The building was left destroyed by Hurricane Helene in September 2024. Floodwaters from heavy rainfall and the nearby New River lifted the building and moved it approximately 50 feet from the original foundation.
