= Miller Homestead (Lansing, North Carolina) =

Historic house in North Carolina, United States

- U.S. National Register of Historic Places
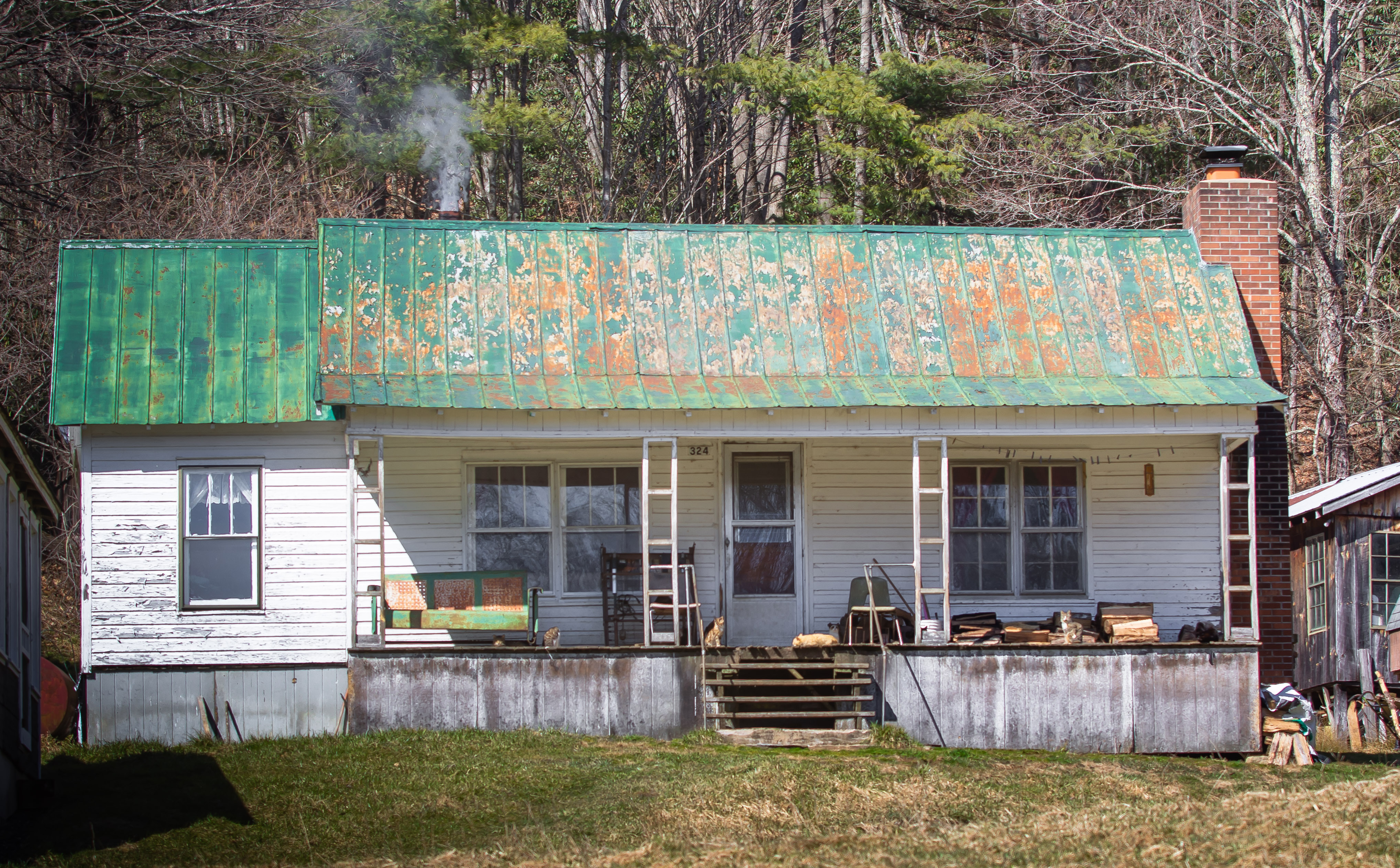

- Location within North Carolina Location within the United States
- Location: 324 Miller Dr., near Lansing, North Carolina
- Coordinates: 36°29′32″N 81°33′25″W
- Area: 12 acres (4.9 ha)
- Built: 1905
- Architect: Charles Miller
- Architectural style: Hall and parlor
- NRHP reference No.: 01001029
- Added to NRHP: September 24, 2001

Miller Homestead is a historic home located near Lansing, Ashe County, North Carolina. The house was built about 1905, and is a one-story-plus-attic frame dwelling sheathed in German siding. Also on the property is a contributing garage (c. 1930, c. 1950) and mill house / woodshed (c. 1920, c. 1935). The property is associated with local folk musicians Charles Miller and his son Howard.

It was listed on the National Register of Historic Places in 2001.
