= Glendale Springs, North Carolina =

Glendale Springs
- Unincorporated community
- Location within North Carolina Location within the United States
- Coordinates: 36°20′42″N 81°22′49″W
- Country: United States
- State: North Carolina
- County: Ashe
- Elevation: 3,074 ft (937 m)
- Time zone: UTC-5 (Eastern (EST))
  - Summer (DST): UTC-4 (EDT)
- ZIP code: 28629
- Area code: 336
- GNIS feature ID: 1020447

Glendale Springs is an unincorporated community in Ashe County, North Carolina, United States. Glendale Springs is located on North Carolina Highway 16, 7.3 miles (11.7 km) southeast of Jefferson. Glendale Springs has a post office with ZIP code 28629.

The Glendale Springs Inn was listed on the National Register of Historic Places in 1979.

== Media reference ==
In the 1990 movie hit, Days of Thunder, Cole Trickle (Tom Cruise) is first mistaken as being from Glendale Springs when Tim Daland (Randy Quaid) corrects the mistake and clarifies he is instead from Glendale, California.
