= Glendale Springs Inn =

- U.S. National Register of Historic Places
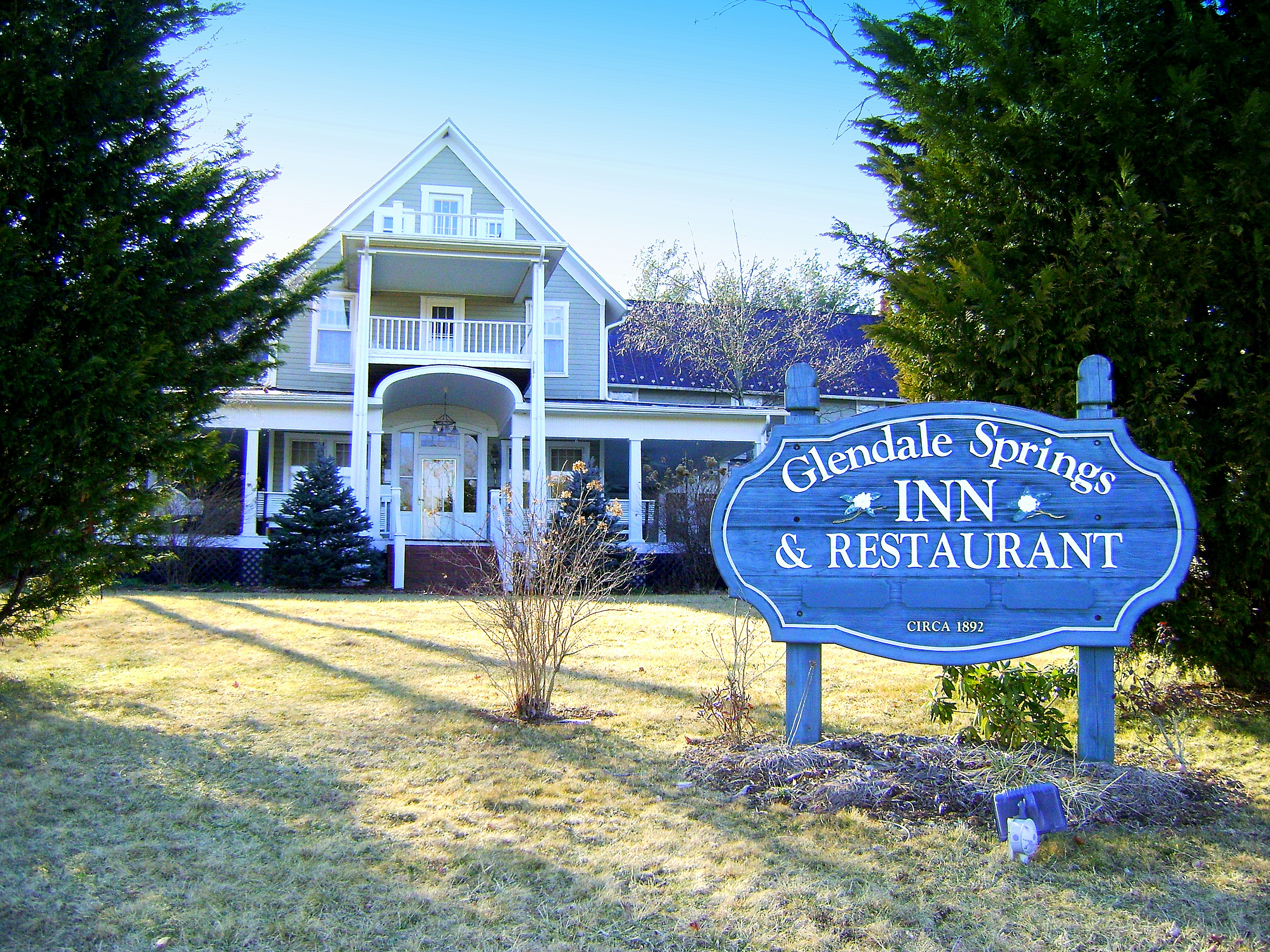
- Glendale Springs Inn, February 2009

- Location within North Carolina Location within the United States
- Location: NC 16 and SR 1632, Glendale Springs, North Carolina
- Coordinates: 36°20′42″N 81°22′52″W
- Area: 2.6 acres (1.1 ha)
- Built: 1895, 1902, 1905
- NRHP reference No.: 79003326
- Added to NRHP: October 10, 1979

Glendale Springs Inn is a historic hotel building located at Glendale Springs, Ashe County, North Carolina. It was built in 1895, and expanded in 1902. A wing was added in 1905. It is a two-story, "T"-plan, frame structure with a steeply pitched intersecting gable roofs and sheathed in plain white weatherboard. It features a wraparound porch and second story balconies. It housed a vacation resort and inn for guests visiting the mineral waters at Glendale Springs. From 1935 to 1938, the inn housed the Works Progress Administration headquarters during construction of the nearby Blue Ridge Parkway. The building was renovated in 1975 with a Family Style Restaurant, underwent subsequent renovations in 1995, and now houses a bed and breakfast inn.

It was listed on the National Register of Historic Places in 1979.
