= Grassy Creek, Ashe County, North Carolina =

Unincorporated community in Ashe County, North Carolina, U.S.

Coordinates: 36°34′25″N 81°23′19″W

Grassy Creek is an unincorporated community in the Grassy Creek Township of Ashe County, North Carolina, United States, near the border with the state of Virginia.

== History ==
Grassy Creek was established around 1788 (Powell 1968, p. 199).

The Grassy Creek Historic District and William Waddell House were listed on the National Register of Historic Places in 2007.

== Demographics ==
Grassy Creek's Zip Code Tabulation Area (Zip Code 28631) has a population of 511 as of the 2000 census. The population is 53.4% male and 46.6% female. About 92.2% of the population is white, 1.2% African-American, 0.6% American Indian, 7.8% Hispanic, 5.3% some other race and 0.8% of people are two or more races.

The median household income is $28,654 with 21.8% of the population living below the poverty line.

== See also ==
- Grassy Creek
