= Todd, North Carolina =

Todd
- Unincorporated community
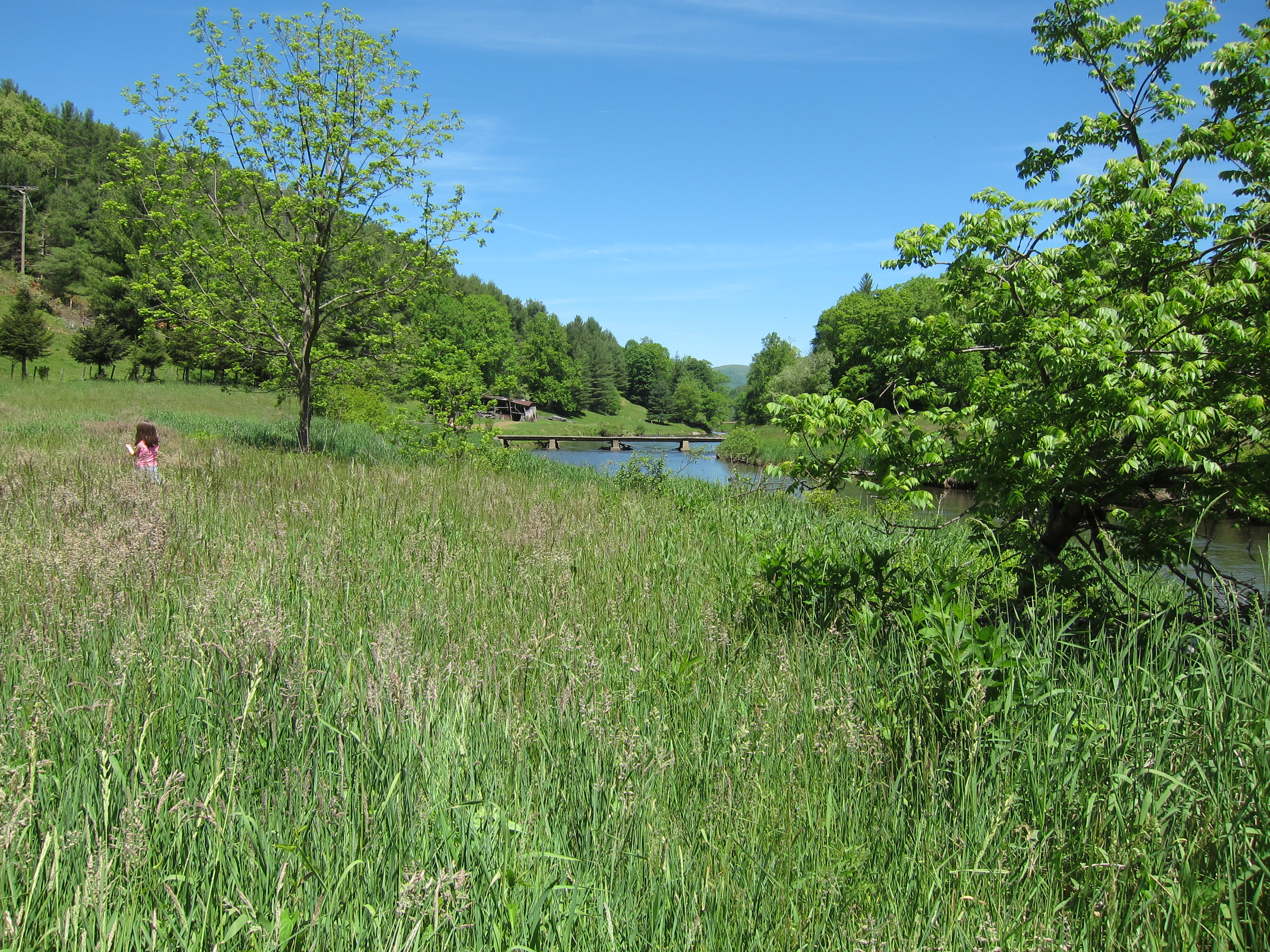
- The south fork of the New River in Todd, NC

- Location within North Carolina
- Country: United States
- State: North Carolina
- Counties: Wautauga, Ashe
- Elevation: 2,992 ft (912 m)

Population (2010)
  - Total: 2,141
- Postal code: 28684

Todd is an unincorporated community straddling the county lines of Watauga and Ashe counties in northwestern North Carolina, United States on the South Fork of the New River. It lies at an elevation of 2,992 feet (912 m). The population was 2,141 at the 2010 United States census. The ZIP Code for Todd is 28684.

The community, originally called Elk Cross Roads, was settled in the late 18th and early 19th centuries. The community was a rural outpost in the backcountry of the Blue Ridge Mountains populated by farmers. The first church, South Fork Baptist Church, was established in 1833, and a Post Office was established in 1837. Blackburn's Chapel, a Methodist church, was founded at Elk Cross Roads in 1850. The community was large enough to be noted on North Carolina maps by the 1850s. Several dry goods stores operated at Elk Cross Roads before the Civil War.

During the latter half of the 19th century, the community grew with large scale timber harvesting and the mining of mica and copper. By the 1890s, Todd was larger than the nearby town of Boone in Watauga County.

In 1894, the Post Office was formally renamed Todd in honor of Joseph Warren Todd, a native son, a Civil War veteran credited with restoring order and thwarting bushwhackers in Watauga and Ashe counties immediately after the war. His brother, James, was shot in the back and killed by bushwhackers near Todd. Col. Todd practiced law in nearby Jefferson following the war until his death in 1909. He also served several terms in the North Carolina General Assembly.

Todd's heyday came in the early 20th century with the timber boom. In 1910, the Virginia–Carolina Railway announced the company would extend tracks from West Jefferson to Elk Cross Roads. The train was known as the "Virginia Creeper" because of its slow but steady ascent of the steep grades.

At the peak of the boom, Todd boasted two doctors, a dentist, one bank, seven stores, three mills and two hotels. The community was incorporated in 1915 and had a mayor, council and a town marshal. Walter Cook, co-founder and operator of the general store for more than 40 years, was the only elected mayor.

The Virginia-Carolina railroad came to Todd because of the tracts of standing timber. But by 1934, the timber was played out, and the Great Depression forced the railroads to discontinue service to Todd. The Bank of Todd was liquidated, and the town's commerce all but vanished in a few years. In 1940, a devastating flood washed away buildings, furthering Todd's decline.

By World War II, only a handful of businesses remained. The North Carolina General Assembly formally revoked the town's charter in the 1970s.

During the middle and latter parts of the 20th century, Todd was just a crossroads with a post office, a store and home to hard-working mountain farming families. By the 21st century, Todd enjoyed a resurgence driven by cultural tourism and second-home communities.

The Elkland School Gymnasium, R. T. Greer and Company Root and Herb Warehouse, and Todd Historic District are listed on the National Register of Historic Places.

== Notable people ==
- Jeff Caldwell (born 1996) – professional soccer player
