= West Jefferson, North Carolina =

- Town
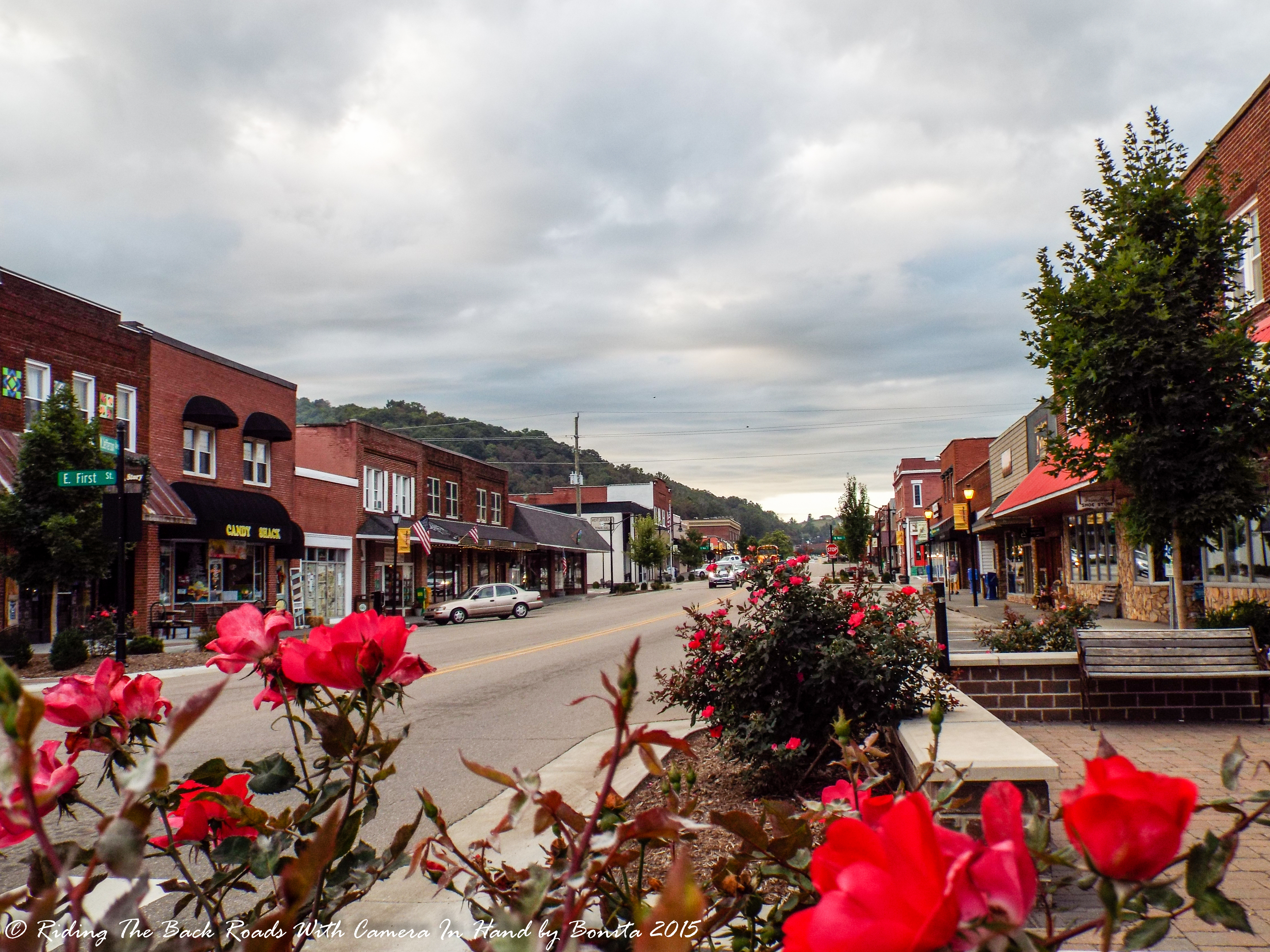
- North Jefferson Avenue in West Jefferson

- Seal

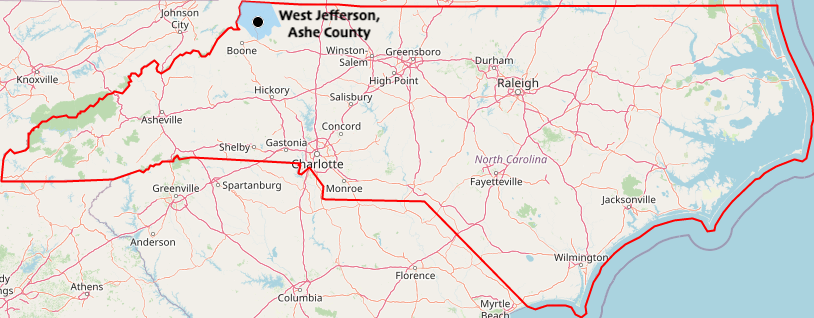
- Location within the U.S. state of North Carolina
- Coordinates: 36°23′46″N 81°30′02″W
- Country: United States
- State: North Carolina
- County: Ashe

Government
  - Mayor: Rusty Barr (interim)

Area
  - Total: 2.15 sq mi (5.58 km^{2})
- Elevation: 2,986 ft (910 m)

Population (2020)
  - Total: 1,279
  - Density: 594.2/sq mi (229.44/km^{2})
- Time zone: UTC-5 (EST)
  - Summer (DST): UTC-4 (EDT)
- ZIP code: 28694
- Area codes: 336, 743
- FIPS code: 37-72540
- GNIS feature ID: 2406863
- Website: www.townofwj.com

West Jefferson is a resort town in Ashe County, North Carolina, United States. The population was 1,279 at the 2020 census.

West Jefferson is a popular destination among tourists and retirees from Florida, as well as those from the lower elevations of the Carolinas and Georgia.

== History ==
West Jefferson was incorporated in 1909. At one time, West Jefferson had the distinction of having the only cheese factory in the southeastern United States. For many decades, West Jefferson was served by the Norfolk and Western Railroad, better known as the "Virginia Creeper." The railroad was the primary reason for the creation of West Jefferson, as the town became a major stop on the railway. With the decline of the railroad and the loss of textile factory jobs to foreign markets, West Jefferson's economy is increasingly devoted to the tourism industry. The town's location in the Appalachian Mountains has led to many tourists visiting the area each year, and many out-of-state tourists have begun to build cabins and housing developments around the town. Attractions include a walkable main street with food, breweries, local art, a cheese factory, a vintage theater, an annual festival, a caboose from a train, and a children's playground.

== Geography ==
West Jefferson is situated in the Appalachian Mountain chain, in a valley between Mount Jefferson (to the east) and Paddy Mountain (to the west).

According to the United States Census Bureau, the town has a total area of 2.1 square miles (5.4 km^{2}), all land.

== Demographics ==
Historical population
Census	Pop.	Note	%±
1920	462		—
1930	704		52.4%
1940	883		25.4%
1950	871		−1.4%
1960	1,000		14.8%
1970	889		−11.1%
1980	822		−7.5%
1990	1,002		21.9%
2000	1,081		7.9%
2010	1,299		20.2%
2020	1,279		−1.5%
U.S. Decennial Census

=== 2020 census ===
West Jefferson racial composition
Race	Number	Percentage
White (non-Hispanic)	1,079	84.36%
Black or African American (non-Hispanic)	18	1.41%
Native American	4	0.31%
Asian	10	0.78%
Other/Mixed	29	2.27%
Hispanic or Latino	139	10.87%

As of the 2020 United States census, there were 1,279 people, 663 households, and 333 families residing in the town.

=== 2000 census ===
As of the census of 2000, there were 1,081 people, 527 households, and 290 families residing in the town. The population density was 619.2 inhabitants per square mile (239.1/km^{2}). There were 601 housing units at an average density of 344.3 per square mile (132.9/km^{2}). The racial makeup of the town was 94.73% White, 0.37% African American, 1.57% Native American, 0.28% Asian, 0.19% Pacific Islander, 2.04% from other races, and 0.83% from two or more races. Hispanic or Latino of any race were 5.27% of the population.

There were 527 households, out of which 22.2% had children under the age of 18 living with them, 40.4% were married couples living together, 11.0% had a female householder with no husband present, and 44.8% were non-families. 41.4% of all households were made up of individuals, and 19.7% had someone living alone who was 65 years of age or older. The average household size was 2.02 and the average family size was 2.69.

In the town, the population was spread out, with 19.3% under the age of 18, 8.8% from 18 to 24, 25.2% from 25 to 44, 23.5% from 45 to 64, and 23.2% who were 65 years of age or older. The median age was 43 years. For every 100 females, there were 87.7 males. For every 100 females age 18 and over, there were 84.0 males.

The median income for a household in the town was $24,479, and the median income for a family was $35,000. Males had a median income of $22,800 versus $18,819 for females. The per capita income for the town was $19,799. About 11.2% of families and 18.9% of the population were below the poverty line, including 25.0% of those under age 18 and 16.9% of those age 65 or over.

== Government ==
The town of West Jefferson operates at the direction of a five-member board of aldermen. The mayor and aldermen are elected to a term of four years, which are staggered.

Tom Hartman served as the mayor of West Jefferson from 2019 to October 2025, when he abruptly resigned. Mayor Pro Tempore Rusty Barr assumed the duties of mayor on October 21, 2025.

== Economy ==
=== GE Aviation ===
The town of West Jefferson operates GE Aviation plant with approximately 270 people.

=== West Jefferson Dr Pepper ===
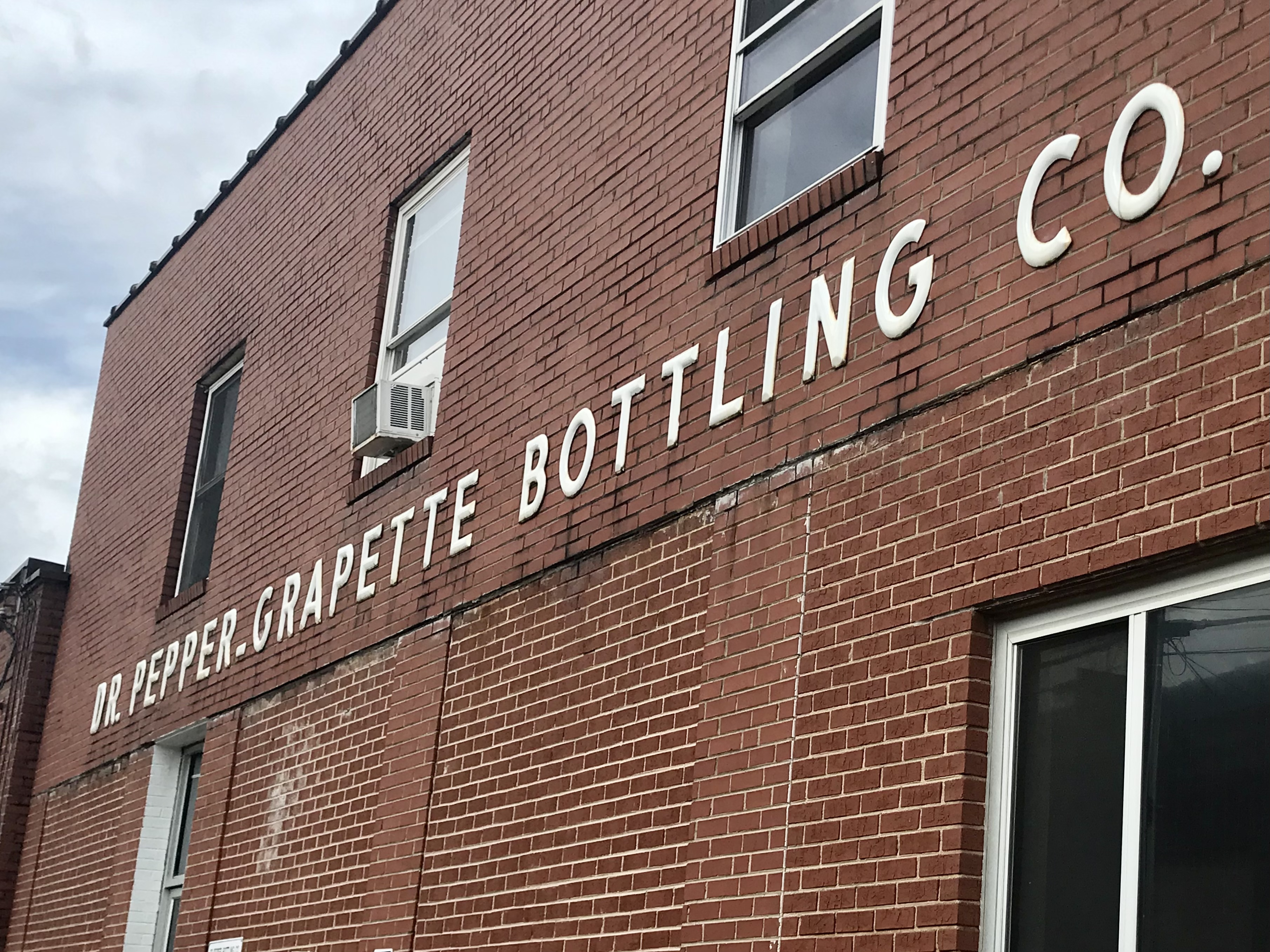
Dr. Pepper bottling plant in West Jefferson

West Jefferson is the home of soda manufacturers West Jefferson Dr Pepper (WJDP). The company is known for producing all their non-diet products with cane sugar, most of which are Dr Pepper Snapple Group (formerly Dr Pepper/Seven Up) products but also include Mountain Dew. WJDP is one of only two non-Pepsi franchises existing in the United States permitted to produce Mountain Dew.

The company does not ship outside its contracted territory, but several websites sell the product at a premium price. The premium price has been justified by the fact that WJDP is one of the last bottlers in the U.S. to use cane sugar instead of high fructose corn syrup.

== Newspapers ==
Ashe County has two newspapers. The oldest covering West Jefferson and Ashe County is the Jefferson Post, which publishes twice weekly and is distributed throughout the county via subscription and newsstand sales. It is owned by Civitas Media, which operates a large chain of small-town newspapers.

The second newspaper is the "Ashe Mountain Times," published once a week and distributed through subscription and newsstand sales. It is owned by Jones Media publishing company and is a sister publication of the Watauga Democrat in Boone.
