= List of unincorporated communities in North Carolina =

The following is a partial list of named, but unincorporated, communities in the state of North Carolina.

== Alamance County ==
- Bellemont, North Carolina
- Carolina, North Carolina
- Eli Whitney, North Carolina
- Glencoe, North Carolina
- Hawfields, North Carolina
- Kimesville, North Carolina
- Lakeview, North Carolina
- Mandale, North Carolina
- Mount Herman, North Carolina
- Pleasant Grove, North Carolina
- Snow Camp, North Carolina

== Alexander County ==
- Drumstand, North Carolina
- Ellendale, North Carolina
- Little River, North Carolina
- Millersville, North Carolina
- Sugar Loaf, North Carolina
- Vashti, North Carolina
- Wittenburg, North Carolina

== Alleghany County ==
- Barrett, North Carolina
- Cherry Lane, North Carolina
- Ennice, North Carolina
- Glade Valley, North Carolina
- Laurel Springs, North Carolina
- Piney Creek, North Carolina
- Roaring Gap, North Carolina
- Scottville, North Carolina
- Twin Oaks, North Carolina

== Anson County ==
- Burnsville, North Carolina
- Pee Dee, North Carolina

== Ashe County ==
- Apple Grove, North Carolina
- Ashland, North Carolina
- Baldwin, North Carolina
- Beaver Creek, North Carolina
- Bina, North Carolina
- Brandon, North Carolina
- Brownwood, North Carolina
- Chestnut Hill, North Carolina
- Clifton, North Carolina
- Comet, North Carolina
- Creston, North Carolina
- Crumpler, North Carolina
- Fig, North Carolina
- Fleetwood, North Carolina
- Glendale Springs, North Carolina
- Grassy Creek, North Carolina
- Grayson, North Carolina
- Helton, North Carolina
- Husk, North Carolina
- Idlewild, North Carolina
- Nathans Creek, North Carolina
- Obids, North Carolina
- Orion, North Carolina
- Oval, North Carolina
- Parker, North Carolina
- Scottville, North Carolina
- Shatley Springs, North Carolina
- Smethport, North Carolina
- Sturgills, North Carolina
- Sutherland, North Carolina
- Todd, North Carolina
- Toliver, North Carolina
- Tuckerdale, North Carolina
- Wagoner, North Carolina
- Warrensville, North Carolina
- Weavers Ford, North Carolina
- Woodford, North Carolina
- Yates, North Carolina

== Avery County ==
- Altamont, North Carolina
- Cranberry, North Carolina
- Frank, North Carolina
- Gragg, North Carolina
- Heaton, North Carolina
- Linville Falls, North Carolina
- Minneapolis, North Carolina
- Montezuma, North Carolina
- Pineola, North Carolina
- Plumtree, North Carolina
- Roaring Creek, North Carolina
- Three Mile, North Carolina
- Vale, North Carolina

== Beaufort County ==
- Blounts Creek, North Carolina
- Edward, North Carolina
- Royal, North Carolina
- Wilmar, North Carolina

== Bertie County ==
- Grabtown, North Carolina
- Merry Hill, North Carolina
- Quitsna, North Carolina
- Republican, North Carolina

== Bladen County ==
- Abbottsburg, North Carolina
- Ammon, North Carolina
- Ammon Ford, North Carolina
- Carvers, North Carolina
- Colly, North Carolina
- Council, North Carolina
- Emerson, North Carolina
- Rosindale, North Carolina
- Sparkleberry Landing, North Carolina
- Zara, North Carolina

== Brunswick County ==
- Ash, North Carolina
- Half Hell, North Carolina
- Longwood, North Carolina
- Old Town, North Carolina
- Red Bug, North Carolina
- Sunset Harbor, North Carolina
- Supply, North Carolina

== Buncombe County ==
- Alexander, North Carolina
- Arden, North Carolina
- Candler, North Carolina
- Coburn, North Carolina
- Enka, North Carolina
- Flat Creek, North Carolina
- Forks of Ivy, North Carolina
- Jupiter, North Carolina (incorporated until 1970)
- Leicester, North Carolina
- Oteen, North Carolina
- Reems Creek, North Carolina
- Ridgecrest, North Carolina
- Riceville, North Carolina
- Royal Pines, North Carolina
- Skyland, North Carolina
- Stocksville, North Carolina
- Swannanoa, North Carolina

== Burke County ==
- Jonas Ridge, North Carolina
- Linville Falls, North Carolina
- Petersburg, North Carolina
- Worry, North Carolina

== Cabarrus County ==
- Cabarrus, North Carolina
- Fisher Town, North Carolina
- Georgeville, North Carolina
- Pioneer Mills, North Carolina
- Odell School, North Carolina
- Rimertown, North Carolina
- Rocky River, North Carolina

== Caldwell County ==
- Collettsville, North Carolina
- Dudley Shoals, North Carolina
- Grandin, North Carolina
- Legerwood, North Carolina
- Patterson, North Carolina
- Yadkin Valley, North Carolina

== Camden County ==
- Bartlett, North Carolina
- Belcross, North Carolina
- Black Swamp, North Carolina
- Old Trap, North Carolina
- Riddle, North Carolina
- Shiloh, North Carolina

== Carteret County ==
- Bettie, North Carolina
- Cape Lookout, North Carolina
- Carolina City, North Carolina
- Cedar Island, North Carolina
- Core Creek, North Carolina
- Gales Creek, North Carolina
- Harlowe, North Carolina
- Horse Marsh, North Carolina
- Lola, North Carolina
- Merrimon, North Carolina
- Mill Creek, North Carolina
- North River, North Carolina
- Ocean, North Carolina
- Otway, North Carolina
- Salter Path, North Carolina
- Sea Gate, North Carolina
- Sea Level, North Carolina
- Smyrna, North Carolina
- South River, North Carolina
- Stacy, North Carolina
- Stella, North Carolina
- Straits, North Carolina
- Wildwood, North Carolina
- Williston, North Carolina
- Wiregrass, North Carolina

== Caswell County ==
- Blanch, North Carolina
- Camp Springs, North Carolina
- Casville, North Carolina
- Cherry Grove, North Carolina
- Estelle, North Carolina
- Fitch, North Carolina
- Hightowers, North Carolina
- Jericho, North Carolina
- Leasburg, North Carolina
- Milesville, North Carolina
- Pelham, North Carolina
- Prospect Hill, North Carolina
- Providence, North Carolina
- Purley, North Carolina
- Quick, North Carolina
- Semora, North Carolina

== Catawba County ==
- Banoak, North Carolina
- Chronicle, North Carolina
- Long Island, North Carolina
- Sherrills Ford, North Carolina
- Terrell, North Carolina

== Chatham County ==
- Asbury, North Carolina
- Bear Creek, North Carolina
- Bells, North Carolina
- Bonlee, North Carolina
- Brickhaven, North Carolina
- Bynum, North Carolina
- Moncure, North Carolina
- Carbonton, North Carolina
- Corinth, North Carolina
- Crutchfield Crossroads, North Carolina
- Farmville, North Carolina
- Farrington, North Carolina
- Harpers Crossroads, North Carolina
- Haywood, North Carolina
- Lockville, North Carolina
- Seaforth, North Carolina
- Silk Hope, North Carolina
- Wilsonville, North Carolina

== Cherokee County ==
- Bellview, North Carolina
- Brasstown, North Carolina
- Culberson, North Carolina
- Friendship, North Carolina
- Grape Creek, North Carolina
- Hothouse, North Carolina
- Martins Creek, North Carolina
- Ogreeta, North Carolina
- Owl Creek, North Carolina
- Rhodo, North Carolina
- Texana, North Carolina
- Tomotla, North Carolina
- Topton, North Carolina
- Unaka, North Carolina

== Chowan County ==
- Rockyhock, North Carolina
- Selwin, North Carolina
- Sign Pine, North Carolina
- Tyner, North Carolina

== Clay County ==
- Brasstown, North Carolina
- Elf, North Carolina
- Shooting Creek, North Carolina
- Tusquittee, North Carolina
- Warne, North Carolina

== Cleveland County ==
- Delight, North Carolina
- Double Shoals, North Carolina
- Hillsdale, North Carolina
- Toluca, North Carolina
- Woodbridge, North Carolina
- Zion, North Carolina

== Columbus County ==
- Acme, North Carolina
- Cherry Grove, North Carolina
- Clarendon, North Carolina
- Evergreen, Ransom Township, North Carolina
- Nakina, North Carolina
- Olyphic, North Carolina
- Pireway, North Carolina
- Riverview, North Carolina
- Sellerstown, North Carolina

== Craven County ==
- Adams Creek, North Carolina
- Askin, North Carolina
- Ernul, North Carolina
- Fort Barnwell, North Carolina
- Harlowe, North Carolina
- Riverdale, North Carolina
- Wilmar, North Carolina

== Cumberland County ==
- Chestnut Hills, North Carolina
- Cumberland, North Carolina
- Dogwood Acres, North Carolina
- Judson, North Carolina
- Montclair, North Carolina

== Currituck County ==
- Aydlett, North Carolina
- Barco, North Carolina
- Carova Beach, North Carolina
- Corolla, North Carolina
- Currituck, North Carolina
- Gibbs Woods, North Carolina
- Gregory, North Carolina
- Harbinger, North Carolina
- Knotts Island, North Carolina
- Jarvisburg, North Carolina
- Mamie, North Carolina
- Maple, North Carolina
- North Swan Beach, North Carolina
- Point Harbor, North Carolina
- Poplar Branch, North Carolina
- Powells Point, North Carolina
- Swan Beach, North Carolina
- Shawboro, North Carolina
- Sligo, North Carolina
- Spot, North Carolina
- Waterlily, North Carolina

== Dare County ==
- Colington Island, North Carolina
- East Lake, North Carolina
- Little Kinnakeet, North Carolina
- Martins Point, North Carolina
- Stumpy Point, North Carolina

== Davidson County ==
- Arcadia, North Carolina
- Bethesda, North Carolina
- Churchland, North Carolina
- Cid, North Carolina
- Gordontown, North Carolina
- Handy, North Carolina
- Holly Grove, North Carolina
- Lakeview, North Carolina
- Linwood, North Carolina
- Montclair, North Carolina
- Pilot, North Carolina
- Reeds, North Carolina
- Silver Hill, North Carolina
- Silver Valley, North Carolina

== Davie County ==
- Calahaln, North Caroilina
- Cornatzer, North Carolina
- Hillsdale, North Carolina
- Jerusalem, North Carolina
- Maine, North Carolina
- Sheffield, North Carolina
- Smith Grove, North Carolina
- Turkeyfoot, North Carolina

== Duplin County ==
- Fountaintown, North Carolina
- Hallsville, North Carolina
- Kornegay, North Carolina
- Murphey, North Carolina
- Safe, North Carolina
- Sarecta, North Carolina

== Durham County ==
- Bahama, North Carolina
- Bethesda, North Carolina
- Blands, North Carolina
- Braggtown, North Carolina
- Genlee, North Carolina
- Joyland, North Carolina
- Nelson, North Carolina
- Oak Grove, North Carolina
- Red Mountain, North Carolina

== Edgecombe County ==
- Battleboro, North Carolina
- Crisp, North Carolina
- Farrar, North Carolina
- Mercer, North Carolina

== Forsyth County ==
- Belews Creek, North Carolina
- Bethabara, North Carolina
- Dennis, North Carolina
- Donnaha, North Carolina
- Dozier, North Carolina
- Horneytown, North Carolina
- Pfafftown, North Carolina
- Seward, North Carolina
- Stanleyville, North Carolina
- Union Cross, North Carolina
- Vienna, North Carolina
- Yorktown, North Carolina

== Franklin County ==
- Alert, North Carolina
- Daddysville, North Carolina
- Epsom, North Carolina
- Five Points, North Carolina
- Gold Sand, North Carolina
- Gupton, North Carolina
- Halls Crossroads, North Carolina
- Harris Crossroads, North Carolina
- Hickory Rock, North Carolina
- Ingleside, North Carolina
- Justice, North Carolina
- Katesville, North Carolina
- Kearney, North Carolina
- Laurel Mill, North Carolina
- Mapleville, North Carolina
- Margaret, North Carolina
- Mitchiners Crossroads, North Carolina
- Moulton, North Carolina
- Needmore, North Carolina
- New Hope, North Carolina
- Oswego, North Carolina
- Pearces, North Carolina
- Pilot, North Carolina
- Pine Ridge, North Carolina
- Pocomoke, North Carolina
- Raynor, North Carolina
- Riley, North Carolina
- Rocky Ford, North Carolina
- Royal, North Carolina
- Schloss, North Carolina
- Seven Paths, North Carolina
- Stallings Crossroads, North Carolina
- Sutton, North Carolina
- White Level, North Carolina
- Wilders Corner, North Carolina
- Wood, North Carolina

== Gaston County ==
- Ashebrook Park, North Carolina
- Boogertown, North Carolina
- Brown Town, North Carolina
- Crowders, North Carolina
- Hardins, North Carolina
- Lucia, North Carolina
- Mountain Island, North Carolina
- South Gastonia, North Carolina
- Tryon, North Carolina

== Gates County ==
- Buckland, North Carolina
- Corapeake, North Carolina
- Eason Crossroads, North Carolina
- Eure, North Carolina
- Gates, North Carolina
- Hoflers Fork, North Carolina
- Holly Grove, North Carolina
- Hobbsville, North Carolina
- Mintonsville, North Carolina
- Roduco, North Carolina
- Sandy Cross, North Carolina
- Selwin, North Carolina
- Tarheel, North Carolina
- White Oak, North Carolina

== Graham County ==
- Atoah, North Carolina
- Bear Creek Junction, North Carolina
- Cheoah, North Carolina
- Dentons, North Carolina
- Dry Creek, North Carolina
- Hidetown, North Carolina
- Jenkins Meadow, North Carolina
- Junction, North Carolina
- McGuires, North Carolina
- Meadow Branch, North Carolina
- Milltown, North Carolina
- Rymers Ferry, North Carolina
- Sawyers Creek, North Carolina
- Stecoah, North Carolina
- Sweetgum, North Carolina
- Tapoco, North Carolina
- Tulula, North Carolina
- Tuskeegee, North Carolina
- Yellow Creek, North Carolina

== Granville County ==
- Belltown, North Carolina
- Berea, North Carolina
- Brassfield, North Carolina
- Bullock, North Carolina
- Clay, North Carolina
- Cornwall, North Carolina
- Cozart, North Carolina
- Culbreth, North Carolina
- Dexter, North Carolina
- Dickerson, North Carolina
- Fairport, North Carolina
- Gela, North Carolina
- Goshen, North Carolina
- Grassy Creek, North Carolina
- Grissom, North Carolina
- Hebron, North Carolina
- Hester, North Carolina
- Horner, North Carolina
- Huntsboro, North Carolina
- Jonathan Crossroads, North Carolina
- Kinton Fork, North Carolina
- Knap of Reeds, North Carolina
- Lewis, North Carolina
- Lyons, North Carolina
- Mount Energy, North Carolina
- Oak Hill, North Carolina
- Northside, North Carolina
- Providence, North Carolina
- Satterwhite, North Carolina
- Shoofly, North Carolina
- Tabbs Creek, North Carolina
- Tally Ho, North Carolina
- Tar River, North Carolina
- Wilbourns, North Carolina
- Wilton, North Carolina

== Greene County ==
- Appie, North Carolina
- Arba, North Carolina
- Browntown Crossroads, North Carolina
- Castoria, North Carolina
- Contentnea, North Carolina
- Daisy Siding, North Carolina
- Fieldsboro, North Carolina
- Fourway, North Carolina
- Glenfield, North Carolina
- Glenfield Crossroads, North Carolina
- Herrings Crossroads, North Carolina
- Hill View, North Carolina
- Jason, North Carolina
- Lindell, North Carolina
- Lizzie, North Carolina
- Oakdale, North Carolina
- Ormondsville, North Carolina
- Scuffleton, North Carolina
- Shine, North Carolina
- Shines Crossroads, North Carolina
- Speights Bridge, North Carolina
- Willow Creek, North Carolina
- Wootens Crossroads, North Carolina

== Guilford County ==
- Browns Summit, North Carolina
- Climax, North Carolina
- Colfax, North Carolina
- Ellisboro, North Carolina
- Guilford, North Carolina
- Julian, North Carolina
- Kimesville, North Carolina
- Monticello, North Carolina
- Revolution, North Carolina

== Halifax County ==
- Aurelian Springs, North Carolina
- Brinkleyville, North Carolina
- Charleston, North Carolina
- Essex, North Carolina
- Heathsville, North Carolina
- Tillery, North Carolina

== Harnett County ==
- Anderson Creek, North Carolina
- Barbecue, North Carolina
- Barclaysville, North Carolina
- Buies Creek, North Carolina
- Bunnlevel, North Carolina
- Cape Fear, North Carolina
- Chalybeate Springs, North Carolina
- Christian Light, North Carolina
- Cokesbury, North Carolina
- Duncan, North Carolina
- Flat Branch, North Carolina
- Flatwoods, North Carolina
- Fonville, North Carolina
- Johnsonville, North Carolina
- Harnett, North Carolina
- Kipling, North Carolina
- Luart, North Carolina
- Mamers, North Carolina
- Olivia, North Carolina
- Overhills, North Carolina
- Pineview, North Carolina
- Rawls, North Carolina
- Ryes, North Carolina
- Seminole, North Carolina
- Shawtown, North Carolina
- Spout Springs, North Carolina
- Turlington, North Carolina

== Haywood County ==
- Bethel, North Carolina
- Crabtree, North Carolina
- Cruso, North Carolina
- Dellwood, North Carolina
- Fines Creek, North Carolina
- Iron Duff, North Carolina
- Saunook, North Carolina

== Henderson County ==
- Bat Cave, North Carolina
- Bearwallow, North Carolina
- Bowman Bluff, North Carolina
- Chestnut Hill, North Carolina
- Mountain Page, North Carolina
- Naples, North Carolina
- Tuxedo, North Carolina
- Zirconia, North Carolina

== Hertford County ==
- Menola, North Carolina
- Millennium, North Carolina
- Tuscarora Beach, North Carolina

== Hoke County ==
- Ashmont, North Carolina
- Antioch, North Carolina
- Arabia, North Carolina
- Inverness, North Carolina
- McCain, North Carolina
- Timberland, North Carolina

== Hyde County ==
- Germantown, North Carolina
- Gulrock, North Carolina
- Hyde, North Carolina
- Last Chance, North Carolina
- Makleyville, North Carolina
- Nebraska, North Carolina
- Ponzer, North Carolina
- Scranton, North Carolina
- Sladesville, North Carolina

== Iredell County ==
- Amity Hill, North Carolina
- Barium Springs, North Carolina
- Cool Springs, North Carolina
- Doolie, North Carolina
- Elmwood, North Carolina
- Hickory Hills, North Carolina
- Houstonville, North Carolina
- Mazeppa, North Carolina
- Mount Mourne, North Carolina
- Olin, North Carolina
- Scotts, North Carolina
- Turkeyfoot, North Carolina
- Turnersburg, North Carolina
- Union Grove, North Carolina

== Jackson County ==
- Addie, North Carolina
- Argura, North Carolina
- Balsam, North Carolina
- Beta, North Carolina
- Gay, North Carolina
- Norton, North Carolina
- Savannah, North Carolina
- Tuckasegee, North Carolina
- Willets, North Carolina
- Wilmot, North Carolina

== Johnston County ==
- Allens Crossroads, North Carolina
- Bagley, North Carolina
- Blackmans Crossroads, North Carolina
- Cleveland, North Carolina
- Emit, North Carolina
- Flowers, North Carolina
- Grabtown, North Carolina
- Hocutts Crossroads, North Carolina
- Jordan, North Carolina
- McGee's Crossroads, North Carolina
- Peacocks Crossroads, North Carolina
- Powhatan, North Carolina
- Spilona, North Carolina
- Stancils Chapel, North Carolina
- West Smithfield, North Carolina
- Willow Springs, North Carolina

== Jones County ==
- Comfort, North Carolina
- Oak Grove, North Carolina
- Olivers, North Carolina
- Pollocks, North Carolina
- Ravenswood, North Carolina
- Wise Forks, North Carolina

== Lee County ==
- Blacknel, North Carolina
- Colon, North Carolina
- Cumnock, North Carolina
- Jonesboro, North Carolina
- Lemon Springs, North Carolina
- Murchisontown, North Carolina
- Osgood, North Carolina
- Pocket, North Carolina
- Swann Station, North Carolina
- Tramway

== Lenoir County ==
- Tick Bite, North Carolina

== Lincoln County ==
- Boger City, North Carolina
- Catawba Springs, North Carolina
- Flay, North Carolina
- Governors Island, North Carolina
- Laboratory, North Carolina
- Laurel Hill, Lincoln County, North Carolina
- Polkadot, North Carolina
- Reepsville, North Carolina
- Toluca, North Carolina
- Vale, Lincoln County, North Carolina

== Macon County ==
- Aquone, North Carolina
- Cullasaja, North Carolina
- Etna, North Carolina
- Gneiss, North Carolina
- Holly Springs, North Carolina
- Iotla, North Carolina
- Kyle, North Carolina
- Leatherman, North Carolina
- Oak Grove, North Carolina
- Otto, North Carolina
- Peek's Creek, North Carolina
- Prentiss, North Carolina
- Rainbow Springs, North Carolina
- Scaly Mountain, North Carolina
- West's Mill, North Carolina

== Madison County ==
- Barnard, North Carolina
- Barnes Branch, North Carolina
- Belva, North Carolina
- Faust, North Carolina
- Foster Creek, North Carolina
- Guntertown, North Carolina
- Hurricane, North Carolina
- Joe, North Carolina
- Luck, North Carolina
- Paint Rock, North Carolina
- Petersburg, North Carolina
- Revere, North Carolina
- Spring Creek, North Carolina
- Spillcorn, North Carolina
- Trust, North Carolina
- Walnut, North Carolina
- White Rock, North Carolina
- Wolf Laurel, North Carolina

== Martin County ==
- Ballard, North Carolina
- Church Crossroads, North Carolina
- Conoho, North Carolina
- Coreys Crossroads, North Carolina
- Dardens, North Carolina
- Farmlife, North Carolina
- Gold Point, North Carolina
- Mount Pilgrim, North Carolina
- Smithwick, North Carolina
- Woodlans Acres, North Carolina

== McDowell County ==
- Ashford, North Carolina
- Davistown, North Carolina
- Dysartsville, North Carolina
- Garden City, North Carolina
- Graphite, North Carolina
- Hankins, North Carolina
- Linville Falls, North Carolina
- Little Switzerland, North Carolina
- Nebo, North Carolina
- North Cove, North Carolina
- Patten, North Carolina
- Providence, North Carolina
- Sunnyvale, North Carolina

== Mecklenburg County ==
- Biddleville, North Carolina
- Caldwell, North Carolina
- Clear Creek, North Carolina
- Cowans Ford, North Carolina
- Derita, North Carolina
- Dixie, North Carolina
- Hicks Crossroads, North Carolina
- Hopewell, North Carolina
- Mallard Creek, North Carolina
- Mountain Island, North Carolina
- Nevin, North Carolina
- Newell, North Carolina
- Old North Charlotte, North Carolina
- Paw Creek, North Carolina
- Providence, North Carolina
- Sardis, North Carolina
- Shamrock, North Carolina
- Steele Creek, North Carolina
- Sugar Creek, North Carolina

== Mitchell County ==
- Altapass, North Carolina
- Bailey, North Carolina
- Bandana, North Carolina
- Buladean, North Carolina
- Clarrissa, North Carolina
- Estatoe, North Carolina
- Hawk, North Carolina
- Kalmia, North Carolina
- Kona, North Carolina
- Ledger, North Carolina
- Little Switzerland, North Carolina
- Loafers Glory, North Carolina
- Penland, North Carolina
- Pigeonroost, North Carolina
- Poplar, North Carolina
- Red Hill, North Carolina
- Relief, North Carolina
- Tipton Hill, North Carolina
- Toecane, North Carolina

== Montgomery County ==
- Abner, North Carolina
- Black Ankle, North Carolina
- Blaine, North Carolina
- Chip, North Carolina
- Dry Creek, North Carolina
- Eldorado, North Carolina
- Emery, North Carolina
- Ether, North Carolina
- Harrisville, North Carolina
- Immer, North Carolina
- Lovejoy, North Carolina
- Okeewemee, North Carolina
- Ophir, North Carolina
- Pee Dee, North Carolina
- Pekin, North Carolina
- Steeds, North Carolina
- Uwharrie, North Carolina
- Wadeville, North Carolina
- Wind Blow, North Carolina

== Moore County ==
- Bensalem, North Carolina
- Eagle Springs, North Carolina
- Glendon, North Carolina
- Highfalls, North Carolina
- Lakeview, North Carolina
- Manly, North Carolina
- McConnell, North Carolina
- Putnam, North Carolina
- Spies, North Carolina
- West End, North Carolina
- Westmoore, North Carolina
- West Philadelphia, North Carolina

== Nash County ==
- Ashburk, North Carolina
- Aventon, North Carolina
- Bass Crossroads, North Carolina
- Battleboro, North Carolina
- Corinth, North Carolina
- Hilliardston, North Carolina
- Drake, North Carolina
- Dukes, North Carolina
- Gold Rock, North Carolina
- Hunts, North Carolina
- Langley Crossroads, North Carolina
- Oakland, North Carolina
- Samaria, North Carolina
- Stanhope, North Carolina
- Union Hope, North Carolina
- Westry, North Carolina
- White Oak, North Carolina
- Winstead Crossroads, North Carolina

== New Hanover County ==
- Cape Fear, North Carolina
- Masonboro, North Carolina
- Monkey Junction, North Carolina
- Seagate, North Carolina
- Smith Creek, North Carolina
- Wilmington Beach, North Carolina
- Windemere, North Carolina

== Northampton County ==
- Henrico, North Carolina
- Margarettsville, North Carolina
- Pendleton, North Carolina
- Pleasant Hill, North Carolina
- Potecasi, North Carolina
- Rehoboth, North Carolina
- Turners Crossroads, North Carolina
- Vultare, North Carolina

== Onslow County ==
- Bear Creek, North Carolina
- Haws Run, North Carolina
- Hubert, North Carolina
- Maple Hill, North Carolina
- Montclair, North Carolina
- Petersburg, North Carolina
- Verona, North Carolina

== Orange County ==
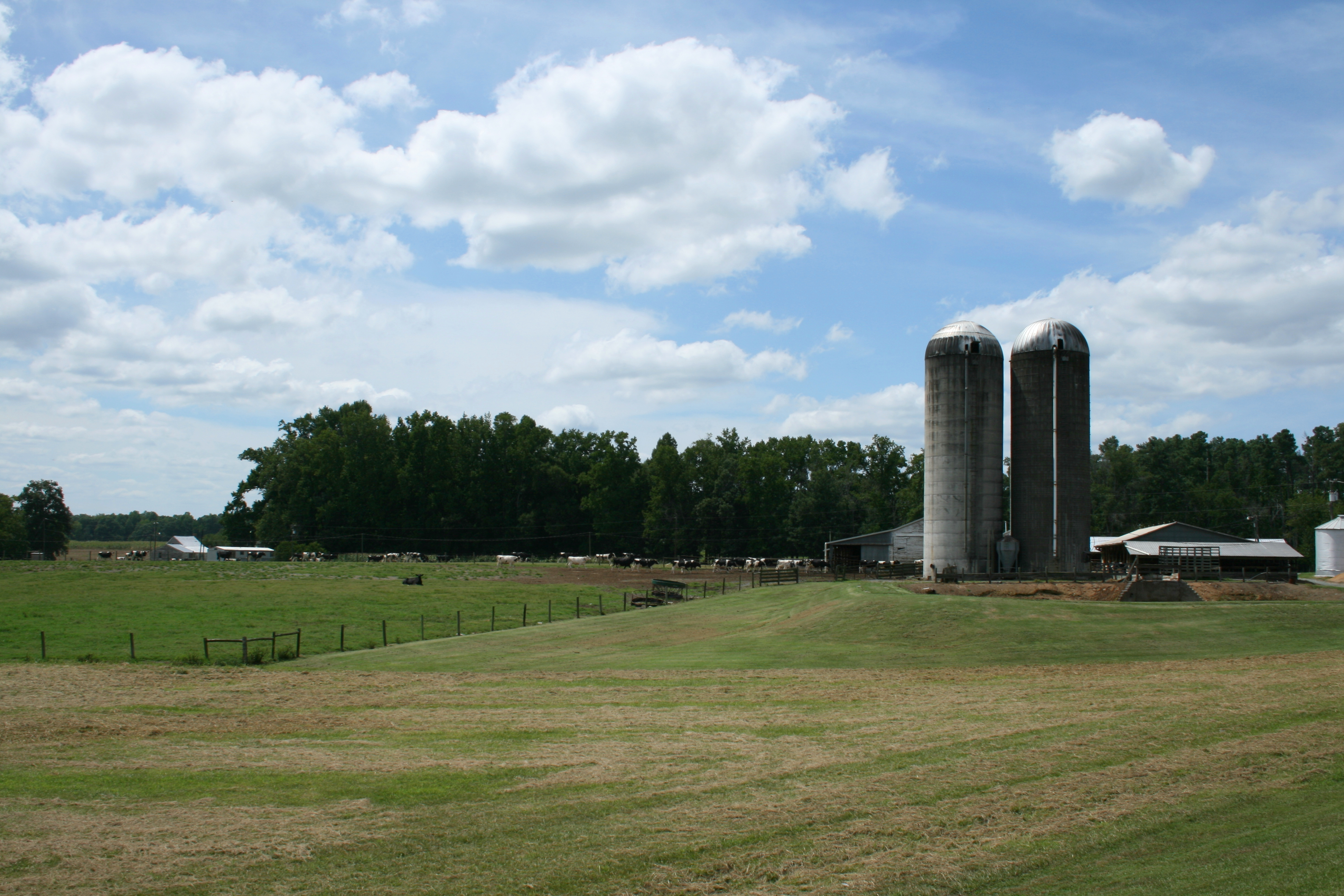
A farm in White Cross, North Carolina

- Blackwood, North Carolina
- Buckhorn, North Carolina
- Caldwell, North Carolina
- Calvander, North Carolina
- Carr, North Carolina
- Cedar Grove, North Carolina
- Dodsons Crossroads, North Carolina
- Dogwood Acres, North Carolina
- Eno, North Carolina
- Eubanks, North Carolina
- Fairview, Hillsborough, North Carolina
- Hurdle Mills, North Carolina
- Laws, North Carolina
- McDade, North Carolina
- Miles, North Carolina
- Oaks, North Carolina
- Orange Grove, North Carolina
- Piney Grove, North Carolina
- Schley, North Carolina
- Teer, North Carolina
- University, North Carolina
- White Cross, North Carolina

== Pamlico County ==
- Cash Corner, North Carolina
- Florence, North Carolina
- Janeiro, North Carolina
- Lowland, North Carolina
- Maribel, North Carolina
- Merritt, North Carolina
- Olympia, North Carolina
- Pamlico, North Carolina
- Reelsboro, North Carolina
- Whortonsville, North Carolina

== Pasquotank County ==
- Nixonton, North Carolina
- Pasquotank, North Carolina
- Weeksville, North Carolina

== Pender County ==
- Canetuck, North Carolina
- Currie, North Carolina
- Montague, North Carolina
- Register, North Carolina
- Scotts Hill, North Carolina
- Sloop Point, North Carolina
- Topsail, North Carolina
- Willard, North Carolina
- Yamacraw, North Carolina

== Perquimans County ==
- Belvidere, North Carolina
- New Hope, North Carolina
- Woodville, North Carolina

== Person County ==
- Ai, North Carolina
- Allens Level, North Carolina
- Allensville, North Carolina
- Bethel Hill, North Carolina
- Brooksdale, North Carolina
- Bushy Fork, North Carolina
- Ca-Vel, North Carolina
- Ceffo, North Carolina
- Concord, North Carolina
- Cunningham, North Carolina
- Denny Store, North Carolina
- Five Forks, North Carolina
- Gentry Store, North Carolina
- Gordonton, North Carolina
- Hesters Store, North Carolina
- Hurdle Mills, North Carolina
- Leasburg, North Carolina
- Longhurst, North Carolina
- Longs Store, North Carolina
- Moriah, North Carolina
- Mount Tirzah, North Carolina
- Olive Hill, North Carolina
- Paynes Tavern, North Carolina
- Peeds Store, North Carolina
- Roseville, North Carolina
- Semora, North Carolina
- Somerset, North Carolina
- Surl, North Carolina
- Timberlake, North Carolina
- Triple Springs, North Carolina
- Whitt Town, North Carolina
- Woodsdale, North Carolina

== Pitt County ==
- Bell Fork, North Carolina
- Black Jack, North Carolina
- Calico, North Carolina
- Chicod, North Carolina
- Congleton, North Carolina
- House, North Carolina
- Oakley, Pitt County, North Carolina
- Pactolus, North Carolina

== Polk County ==
- Burnt Chimney Corner, North Carolina
- Collinsville, North Carolina
- Lynn, North Carolina
- Mill Spring, North Carolina
- Valhalla, North Carolina

== Randolph County ==
- Cedar Falls, North Carolina
- Cedar Grove, North Carolina
- Climax, North Carolina
- Coleridge, North Carolina
- Complex, North Carolina
- Erect, North Carolina
- Farmer, North Carolina
- Level Cross, North Carolina
- Pisgah, North Carolina
- Sophia, North Carolina
- Ulah, North Carolina
- Whynot, North Carolina

== Richmond County ==
- Cognac, North Carolina
- Cordova, North Carolina
- Fruitland, Richmond County, North Carolina
- Marston, North Carolina
- Osborne, North Carolina
- West Rockingham, North Carolina
- Wind Blow, North Carolina

== Robeson County ==
- Alfordsville, North Carolina
- Barnesville, North Carolina
- East Lumberton, North Carolina
- Echo, North Carolina
- Floral College, North Carolina
- Five Forks, North Carolina
- Howellsville, North Carolina
- Moss Neck, North Carolina
- Pates, North Carolina
- Red Banks, North Carolina
- Tolarsville, North Carolina

== Rockingham County ==
- Bethany, North Carolina
- Monroeton, North Carolina
- Oregon Hill, North Carolina
- Price, North Carolina
- Providence, North Carolina
- Ruffin, North Carolina

== Rowan County ==
- Barber, North Carolina
- Bear Poplar, North Carolina
- Bellemeade, North Carolina
- Bostian Heights, North Carolina
- Correll Park, North Carolina
- Craven, North Carolina
- Crescent, North Carolina
- Dogwood Acres, North Carolina
- Dukeville, North Carolina
- Five Forks, North Carolina
- Five Points, North Carolina
- Franklin, North Carolina
- Liberty, North Carolina
- Mill Bridge, North Carolina
- Morgan Ford, North Carolina
- Mount Ulla, North Carolina
- Mount Vernon, North Carolina
- Needmore, North Carolina
- Orchard Hills, North Carolina
- Pittsburg, North Carolina
- Pooletown, North Carolina
- Shupings Mill, North Carolina
- Timbercreek, North Carolina
- Trading Ford, North Carolina
- Watson Village, North Carolina
- Westcliff, North Carolina
- Woodbine, North Carolina
- Woodleaf, North Carolina
- Yadkin, North Carolina

== Rutherford County ==
- Corinth, North Carolina
- Danieltown, North Carolina
- Harris, North Carolina
- Hollis, North Carolina
- Hopewell, North Carolina
- Mount Vernon, North Carolina
- Sandy Mush, North Carolina
- Union Mills, North Carolina

== Sampson County ==
- Clear Run, North Carolina
- Moltonville, North Carolina
- Rebel City, North Carolina
- Suttontown, North Carolina
- Tomahawk, North Carolina

== Scotland County ==
- East Laurinburg, North Carolina
- Montclair, North Carolina

== Stanly County ==
- Beetsville, North Carolina
- Big Lick, North Carolina
- Bloomington, North Carolina
- Cottonville, North Carolina
- Endy, North Carolina
- Finger, North Carolina
- Frog Pond, North Carolina
- Kingville, North Carolina
- Lambert, North Carolina
- Palestine, North Carolina
- Palmerville, North Carolina
- Plyler, North Carolina
- Porter, North Carolina
- Ridgecrest, North Carolina
- River Haven, North Carolina
- Whitney, North Carolina

== Stokes County ==
- Aarons Corner, North Carolina
- Amostown, North Carolina
- Asbury, North Carolina
- Boyles Chapel, North Carolina
- Brook Cove, North Carolina
- Brown Mountain, North Carolina
- Campbell, North Carolina
- Capella, North Carolina
- Ceramic, North Carolina
- Chestnut Grove, North Carolina
- Collinstown, North Carolina
- Dalton, North Carolina
- Dillard, North Carolina
- Dodgetown, North Carolina
- Flat Rock, North Carolina
- Flat Shoals, North Carolina
- Francisco, North Carolina
- Gap, North Carolina
- Hartman, North Carolina
- Lawsonville, North Carolina
- Meadows, North Carolina
- Moores Springs, North Carolina
- Mountain View, North Carolina
- Mount Olive, North Carolina
- Neatman, North Carolina
- Oak Ridge, North Carolina
- Pine Hall, North Carolina
- Poplar Springs, North Carolina
- Prestonville, North Carolina
- Quaker Gap, North Carolina
- Rosebud, North Carolina
- Sandy Ridge, North Carolina
- Volunteer, North Carolina
- Westfield, North Carolina

== Surry County ==
- Albion, North Carolina
- Ararat, North Carolina
- Ash Hill, North Carolina
- Bannertown, North Carolina
- Blackwater, North Carolina
- Blevins Store, North Carolina
- Boones Hill, North Carolina
- Bottom, North Carolina
- Burch, North Carolina
- Cedar Hill, North Carolina
- Combstown, North Carolina
- Copeland, North Carolina
- Crooked Oak, North Carolina
- Crutchfield, North Carolina
- Devotion, North Carolina
- Fairview Crossroads, North Carolina
- Franklin, North Carolina
- Hills Grove, North Carolina
- Holly Springs, North Carolina
- Indian Grove, North Carolina
- Jenkinstown, North Carolina
- Ladonia, North Carolina
- Level Cross, North Carolina
- Little Richmond, North Carolina
- Long Hill, North Carolina
- Mount Herman, North Carolina
- Mountain Park, North Carolina
- Mulberry, North Carolina
- New Hope, North Carolina
- Oak Grove, North Carolina
- Pine Hill, North Carolina
- Pine Ridge, North Carolina
- Poplar Springs, North Carolina
- Red Brush, North Carolina
- Rockford, North Carolina
- Round Peak, North Carolina
- Salem, North Carolina
- Salem Fork, North Carolina
- Sheltontown, North Carolina
- Shoals, North Carolina
- Siloam, North Carolina
- Slate Mountain, North Carolina
- State Road, North Carolina
- Stony Knoll, North Carolina
- Thurmond, North Carolina
- Turkey Ford, North Carolina
- Union Cross, North Carolina
- Union Hill, North Carolina
- Westfield, North Carolina
- White Sulphur Springs, North Carolina
- Woodville, North Carolina
- Zephyr, North Carolina

== Swain County ==
- Alarka, North Carolina
- Almond, North Carolina
- Big Laurel, North Carolina
- Birdtown, North Carolina
- Deals Gap, North Carolina
- De Hart Mill, North Carolina
- Ela, North Carolina
- Fairfax, North Carolina
- Halls Ford, North Carolina
- Hewitt, North Carolina
- Lauada, North Carolina
- Maple Springs, North Carolina
- Nantahala, North Carolina
- Needmore, North Carolina
- Oconaluftee, North Carolina
- Proctor, North Carolina
- Ravensford, North Carolina
- Roundhill, North Carolina
- Solola Valley, North Carolina
- Talc Mountain, North Carolina
- Three Forks, North Carolina
- Unahala, North Carolina
- Wesser, North Carolina

== Transylvania County ==
- Balsam Grove, North Carolina
- Cathey's Creek, North Carolina
- Cedar Mountain, North Carolina
- Connestee Falls, North Carolina
- Dunn's Rock, North Carolina
- Lake Toxaway, North Carolina
- Little River, North Carolina
- Penrose, North Carolina
- Pisgah Forest, North Carolina
- Quebec, North Carolina
- Sapphire, North Carolina

== Tyrrell County ==
- Alligator, North Carolina
- Fort Landing, North Carolina
- Frying Pan, North Carolina
- Jerry, North Carolina
- Kilkenny, North Carolina
- Pleasant View, North Carolina

== Union County ==
- Altan, North Carolina
- Brief, North Carolina
- Houston, North Carolina
- Jackson, North Carolina
- New Salem, North Carolina
- Olive Branch, North Carolina
- Rock Rest, North Carolina
- Roughedge, North Carolina
- Stouts, North Carolina

== Vance County ==
- Adcock Crossroads, North Carolina
- Bear Pond, North Carolina
- Bobbitt, North Carolina
- Brookston, North Carolina
- Cokesbury, North Carolina
- Dabney, North Carolina
- Drewry, North Carolina
- Epsom, North Carolina
- Gillburg, North Carolina
- Greystone, North Carolina
- Steedville, North Carolina
- Townsville, North Carolina
- Tungsten, North Carolina
- Watkins, North Carolina
- Weldons Mill, North Carolina
- Westwood Hills, North Carolina
- Williamsboro, North Carolina
- Willow Oaks, North Carolina
- Woodworth, North Carolina

== Wake County ==
- Asbury, North Carolina
- Auburn, North Carolina
- Banks, North Carolina
- Barham, North Carolina
- Bayleaf, North Carolina
- Bonsal, North Carolina
- Carpenter, North Carolina
- Chestnut Hills, North Carolina
- Clegg, North Carolina
- Eagle Rock, North Carolina
- Falls, North Carolina
- Feltonville, North Carolina
- Five Points, North Carolina
- Forestville, North Carolina
- Fowlers Crossroads, North Carolina
- Friendship, North Carolina
- Green Level, North Carolina
- Holland, North Carolina
- Hollemans Crossroads, North Carolina
- Hopkins, North Carolina
- Horseburg, North Carolina
- Kennebec, North Carolina
- Lassiter, North Carolina
- Leesville, North Carolina
- Lizard Lick, North Carolina
- Macks Village, North Carolina
- Marks Creek, North Carolina
- McCullers, North Carolina
- Medfield, North Carolina
- Method, North Carolina
- Milburnie, North Carolina
- Millbrook, North Carolina
- Mount Pleasant, North Carolina
- Neuse, North Carolina
- New Hill, North Carolina
- New Hope, North Carolina
- New Light, North Carolina
- Purnell, North Carolina
- Riley Hill, North Carolina
- Rogers Store, North Carolina
- Sandy Plain, North Carolina
- Shotwell, North Carolina
- Six Forks, North Carolina
- Stony Hill, North Carolina
- Wake Crossroads, North Carolina
- Wakefield, North Carolina
- Walkers Crossroads, North Carolina
- Westover, North Carolina
- West Raleigh, North Carolina
- Wilbon, North Carolina
- Williams Crossroads, North Carolina
- Willow Spring, North Carolina
- Wyatt, North Carolina

== Warren County ==
- Afton, North Carolina
- Arcola, North Carolina
- Axtell, North Carolina
- Church Hill, North Carolina
- Creek, North Carolina
- Drewry, North Carolina
- Elams, North Carolina
- Elberon, North Carolina
- Embro, North Carolina
- Enterprise, North Carolina
- Five Forks, North Carolina
- Grove Hill, North Carolina
- Inez, North Carolina
- Liberia, North Carolina
- Lickskillet, North Carolina
- Manson, North Carolina
- Marmaduke, North Carolina
- Oakville, North Carolina
- Odell, North Carolina
- Oine, North Carolina
- Old Bethlehem, North Carolina
- Parktown, North Carolina
- Paschall, North Carolina
- Ridgeway, North Carolina
- Rose Hill, North Carolina
- Snow Hill, North Carolina
- Soul City, North Carolina
- Vaughan, North Carolina
- Vicksboro, North Carolina
- Warren Plains, North Carolina
- Wise, North Carolina

== Washington County ==
- Mackeys, North Carolina
- Pea Ridge, North Carolina
- Scuppernong, North Carolina
- Skinnersville, North Carolina
- Wenona, North Carolina

== Watauga County ==
- Aho, North Carolina
- Bamboo, North Carolina
- Deep Gap, North Carolina
- Laxon, North Carolina
- Leander, North Carolina
- Lovill, North Carolina
- Mabel, North Carolina
- Matney, North Carolina
- Meat Camp, North Carolina
- Peoria, North Carolina
- Reese, North Carolina
- Rominger, North Carolina
- Rutherwood, North Carolina
- Sherwood, North Carolina
- Shulls Mill, North Carolina
- Silverstone, North Carolina
- Stony Fork, North Carolina
- Sugar Grove, North Carolina
- Todd, North Carolina
- Triplett, North Carolina
- Vilas, North Carolina
- Zionville, North Carolina

== Wayne County ==
- Faro, North Carolina
- Genoa, North Carolina
- Grantham, North Carolina
- Greenleaf, North Carolina
- Hopewell, North Carolina
- Nahunta, North Carolina
- Rosewood, North Carolina
- Saulston, North Carolina

== Wilkes County ==
- Abshers, North Carolina
- Boomer, North Carolina
- Buck, North Carolina
- Call, North Carolina
- Clingman, North Carolina
- Darby, North Carolina
- Dehart, North Carolina
- Dellaplane, North Carolina
- Dockery, North Carolina
- Doughton, North Carolina
- Elkville, North Carolina
- Ferguson, North Carolina
- Gilreath, North Carolina
- Halls Mills, North Carolina
- Harley, North Carolina
- Joynes, North Carolina
- Knottville, North Carolina
- Lomax, North Carolina
- Maple Springs, North Carolina
- McGrady, North Carolina
- Mount Zion, North Carolina
- Moxley, North Carolina
- New Castle, North Carolina
- Oakwoods, North Carolina
- Osbornville, North Carolina
- Parsonsville, North Carolina
- Purlear, North Carolina
- Radical, North Carolina
- Ready Branch, North Carolina
- Roaring River, North Carolina
- Thurmond, North Carolina
- Traphill, North Carolina
- Vannoy, North Carolina
- Wilbar, North Carolina
- Windy Gap, North Carolina

== Wilson County ==
- Bridgersville, North Carolina
- Cliftonville, North Carolina
- Connor, North Carolina
- Evansdale, North Carolina
- Fillmore, North Carolina
- Hawra, North Carolina
- Lamms Crossroads, North Carolina
- Montclair, North Carolina
- New Hope, North Carolina
- Rock Ridge, North Carolina
- Sun, North Carolina
- Wilbanks, North Carolina

== Yadkin County ==
- Barney Hill, North Carolina
- Branon, North Carolina
- Brooks Crossroads, North Carolina
- Buck Shoals, North Carolina
- Center, North Carolina
- Courtney, North Carolina
- Cycle, North Carolina
- Enon, North Carolina
- Flint Hill, Yadkin County, North Carolina
- Footville, North Carolina
- Forbush, North Carolina
- Hamptonville, North Carolina
- Harmony Heights, North Carolina
- Huntsville, North Carolina
- Lone Hickory, North Carolina
- Longtown, North Carolina
- Marler, North Carolina
- Nebo, North Carolina
- Poindexter, North Carolina
- Richmond Hill, North Carolina
- Swan Creek, North Carolina
- Union Hill, North Carolina
- Windsor's Crossroads, North Carolina
- Wyo, North Carolina

== Yancey County ==
- Bald Creek, North Carolina
- Bee Log, North Carolina
- Bent Creek, North Carolina
- Busick, North Carolina
- Cane River, North Carolina
- Celo, North Carolina
- Day Book, North Carolina
- Eskota, North Carolina
- Green Mountain, North Carolina
- Hamrick, North Carolina
- Higgins, North Carolina
- Micaville, North Carolina
- Murchison, North Carolina
- Newdale, North Carolina
- Paint Gap, North Carolina
- Pensacola, North Carolina
- Price Creek, North Carolina
- Ramseytown, North Carolina
- Sioux, North Carolina
- Swiss, North Carolina
- Toledo, North Carolina
- Windom, North Carolina
- Wolf Laurel, North Carolina

== See also ==
- List of townships in North Carolina
- List of municipalities in North Carolina
- List of counties in North Carolina
- List of North Carolina county seats
