= Lakeview, North Carolina =

Lakeview may refer to the following places in the U.S. state of North Carolina:

- Lakeview, Alamance County, North Carolina
- Lakeview, Davidson County, North Carolina
- Lakeview, Moore County, North Carolina
