= Chestnut Hills, North Carolina =

Chestnut Hills, North Carolina may refer to:

- Chestnut Hills, Cumberland County, North Carolina
- Chestnut Hills, Wake County, North Carolina

== See also ==
- Chestnut Hill, North Carolina (disambiguation)
