= Fonville =

Fonville may refer to:

- Fonville, North Carolina
- Fonville (surname)
