= Grabtown =

Grabtown may refer to:

- Grabtown, Bertie County, North Carolina, an unincorporated community in Bertie County, North Carolina
- Grabtown, Johnston County, North Carolina, an unincorporated community in Johnston County, North Carolina
