= Worry (disambiguation) =

Worry is anxiety or concern about a real or imagined issue.

Worry may also refer to:

- Worry, North Carolina, an unincorporated community in Burke County, North Carolina, United States
- Worry (album), a 2016 album by Jeff Rosenstock
- "Worry", a 2023 song by the Lottery Winners from Anxiety Replacement Therapy
- Worry (short film), a nominee for the AACTA Award for Best Short Animation in 1987

== See also ==
- Don't Worry (disambiguation)
- No worries (disambiguation)
