= Relief, North Carolina =

- Unincorporated community
- Location within North Carolina Location within the United States
- Coordinates: 36°02′03″N 82°17′36″W
- Country: United States
- State: North Carolina
- County: Mitchell
- Named for: Hart's Relief
- Elevation: 2,103 ft (641 m)
- Time zone: UTC-5 (Eastern (EST))
  - Summer (DST): UTC-4 (EDT)
- ZIP Code: 28740 (Green Mountain)
- Area code: 828
- GNIS feature ID: 1014824

Relief is an unincorporated community in Mitchell County, North Carolina, United States. The community is located along the banks of the North Toe River, connected to North Carolina Highway 197 (NC 197) via Relief Road (SR 1314).

== History ==
In 1870, the Squire Peterson’s Store sold a patent medicine called Hart's Relief, in which the principal ingredient was alcohol; patrons enjoyed the “relief” it provided. In 1888, the Relief Post Office was established; during its tenure it assumed mail service from nearby Poplar (1949), Street (1917), and Tipton Hill (1951). In 1974 the post office was closed and replaced with rural letter carrier service from Green Mountain.
