= Tornado outbreak of March 28–29, 2010 =

Weather affecting the Southeast U.S. and The Bahamas

Meteorological history
- Duration: March 28–29, 2010

Tornado outbreak
- Tornadoes: 13
- Max. rating: EF3 tornado
- Duration: ~19 hours

Overall effects
- Fatalities: 3 fatalities, 13 injuries
- Damage: >$15.5 million (2010 USD)

The tornado outbreak of March 28–29, 2010 affected the Southeast United States and The Bahamas on March 28–29, 2010.

A low pressure system pushed northward through the Ohio Valley on March 28. Several tornadoes were reported in the warm sector stretching from Virginia south to Florida. The Piedmont Triad was hardest hit. Damage was also reported near Charlotte. An EF3 tornado struck High Point, NC. An EF2 tornado hit Linwood in Davidson County, NC, and two more EF2 tornadoes struck south-central South Carolina. An unrated tornado also struck Freeport in the Bahamas on March 29.

== Confirmed tornadoes ==
Confirmed tornadoes by Enhanced Fujita rating
EFU	EF0	EF1	EF2	EF3	EF4	EF5	Total
1	4	4	3	1	0	0	13

=== March 28 event ===
List of confirmed tornadoes –Sunday, March 28, 2010 (Note: All dates are based on the local time zone where the tornado touched down; however, all times are in Coordinated Universal Time for consistency.)
EF#	Location	County / Parish	State	Start Coord.	Time (UTC)	Path length	Max width	Summary
EF1	ENE of Woodlawn to SW of Edgefield	McCormick, Edgefield	SC	33.633°N 82.119°W	21:06–21:25	13.35 mi (21.48 km)	110 yd (100 m)	A tornado took down numerous trees along its path, including in the Sumter National Forest.
EF1	Belmont	Gaston	NC	35.2346°N 81.0166°W	21:37–21:38	0.13 mi (0.21 km)	100 yd (91 m)	A brief tornado touched down and damaged a mill before moving into a mobile home park, damaging several homes and downing numerous trees.
EF0	West Eau Gallie	Brevard	FL	28.119°N 80.7135°W	22:00–22:04	2.31 mi (3.72 km)	200 yd (180 m)	A weak tornado crossed I-95 into West Eau Gallie, snapping tree branches and palm fronds. Minor damage also occurred to two structures.
EF2	Spencer to ENE of Lakeview	Rowan, Davidson	NC	35.691°N 80.431°W	22:46–22:55	5 mi (8.0 km)	200 yd (180 m)	A tornado touched down in Spencer, just east of the town center. When it touched down, the facade and roof of a shopping center was damaged. The tornado moved northeast through town, causing minor roof damage to several homes and blowing the awning off a business. A brick chimney was blown off a home as well. A shed and boat awning were destroyed as well. The tornado exited Spencer and crossed I-85 and then crossed the Yadkin River into Davidson County. As soon as it made landfall again, the tornado sheared off or uprooted numerous trees. A carport was ripped from a home and two outbuildings were destroyed. Continuing northeast, the tornado damaged a vacant flea market building, twisting the debris around several trees and high tension power lines. The tornado then reached peak intensity and completely destroyed three mobile homes before severely damaging an additional three more. The tornado then dissipated in a wooded area shortly after reaching peak intensity. Five injuries occurred.
EF1	W of High Point	Davidson	NC	35.9616°N 80.0875°W	23:15–23:20	0.83 mi (1.34 km)	50 yd (46 m)	A tornado touched down in a wooded area causing extensive tree damage. It then moved northeast and ripped a carport off of a home. The tornado struck Valley Mobile Home Park, completely destroying or damaging approximately twenty mobile homes. One of the mobile homes and an SUV were thrown into a nearby lake.
EF3	High Point	Guilford	NC	36.0049°N 80.0396°W	23:30–23:40	3.46 mi (5.57 km)	250 yd (230 m)	See section on this tornado
EF0	NNW of Alton	Halifax	VA	36.578°N 79.003°W	02:02–02:03	0.23 mi (0.37 km)	100 yd (91 m)	Several old farm buildings and outbuildings had minor roof and siding damage. One large trees was snapped.
EF2	NNE of Morgana to SSW of Ropers Crossroads	Edgefield	SC	33.629°N 82.042°W	02:24–02:39	2.39 mi (3.85 km)	440 yd (400 m)	A strong tornado occurred in the southern area of the Sumter National Forest near Stevens Creek. Numerous trees and powerlines were downed, two homes suffered moderate damage and a mobile home had half of its roof torn off. A RV was crushed from a tree falling on it.
EF2	WSW of Ridge Road Crossroads to Lake Murray	Lexington	SC	33.9932°N 81.5013°W	03:25–03:37	5.01 mi (8.06 km)	440 yd (400 m)	Approximately forty homes were damaged along with several trees and power lines downed. Several vehicles were also damaged, with one injury occurring from that. A horse was also killed when a portion of a barn collapsed.
EF1	S of Mount Tirzah to SW of Peeds Store	Person	NC	36.2677°N 78.9007°W	03:55–04:05	4.05 mi (6.52 km)	75 yd (69 m)	A tornado touched down, initially snapping multiple trees before striking a subdivision. Several trees were uprooted in the subdivision, along with two modular homes having trees fall onto them. The tornado reached peak intensity exiting the subdivision, snapping numerous pine and hardwood trees and moving a modular home off its foundation. The tornado then moved into a wooded area, producing minor damage to an old barn before dissipating.
EF0	SW of Rion	Fairfield	SC	34.26°N 81.18°W	04:03–04:07	2 mi (3.2 km)	60 yd (55 m)	The SCDOT reported trees downed by a tornado.

=== March 29 event ===
List of confirmed tornadoes – Monday, March 29, 2010
EF#	Location	County / Parish	State	Start Coord.	Time (UTC)	Path length	Max width	Summary
EF0	Oakland Park	Broward	FL	26.1716°N 80.1662°W	12:26–12:37	2.43 mi (3.91 km)	100 yd (91 m)	A tornado touched down in the Royal Palm Isles neighborhood of Oakland Park and quickly crossed I-95 and moving through town, damaging trailers, cars, trees and some roofs. The tornado lifted in the Coral Heights neighborhood.
EF?	Freeport	Grand Bahama	Bahamas	26.3140°N 78.4603°W	~19:30	unknown	unknown	3 deaths – See section on this tornado – A rare tornado occurred in the Bahamas. 4 people were injured.

=== High Point, North Carolina ===
High Point, North Carolina
Meteorological history
- Date: March 28, 2010
- Formed: March 28, 2010, 6:30 PM CDT (UTC−05:00)
- Dissipated: March 28, 2010, 6:40 PM CDT (UTC−05:00)
- Duration: 10 minutes

EF3 tornado
- on the Enhanced Fujita scale
- Highest winds: 136–165 mph (219–266 km/h)

Overall effects
- Casualties: 3 injuries

An EF3 tornado struck High Point, North Carolina, causing 3 injuries and destroying or damaging many structures. The tornado touched down as a 100-mph EF1 in southwest Guilford County, severely damaging a daycare center and flipping an unoccupied school bus. The tornado moved north across US 311 and gained intensity, becoming an EF2 that caused significant damage to structures in the area, including blowing a bedroom off of a single-story home.

It briefly reached EF3 in intensity when it entered a residential area, removing the second story off of a 2-story home and damaging or destroying 50-60 homes in the neighborhood. During this time, a tornado emergency was issued. The tornado weakened to an EF2 and moved into a highly urbanized area, causing minor to moderate damage, and again removing the 2nd story off of a 2-story home.

The storm finally weakened to an EF1 and finally lifted just north of Oak Hollow Lake.

This was the first EF3 tornado to strike the Piedmont Triad region since May 8, 2008, when an EF3 tornado struck Clemmons, just outside Winston-Salem. The tornado caused $9.95 million in property damage, destroying 40 homes and businesses and damaging another 609 structures. The mayor of High Point declared a state of emergency.

=== Freeport, Bahamas ===
Freeport, Bahamas
Meteorological history
- Date: March 29, 2010

EF? tornado
- on the Enhanced Fujita scale

Overall effects
- Fatalities: 3 fatalities, 4 injuries

A tornado struck the Freeport port, toppling a crane and killing 3 workers and injuring 4 more. Roofs were torn off of multiple buildings as well.

Concerns have been raised within the Bahamian government that there was no tornado warning issued by the Bahamas Department of Meteorology.

== See also ==
- List of North American tornadoes and tornado outbreaks
- Tornadoes of 2010
