= Hugh G. Tilley =

American legislator

Hugh G. Tilley was a state legislator in North Carolina. He represented Granville County in the North Carolina House of Representatives in 1887 and 1889, and was a Republican.

Tilley lived in Tally Ho in Granville County, as well as in Oxford.

== See also ==
- African American officeholders from the end of the Civil War until before 1900
