= Be Happy =

Be Happy may refer to:

- Be Happy (TV series), a 2011 Singaporean TV series
- Be Happy (Rina Aiuchi album), 2001
- Be Happy, a 1999 album by Yurisangja
- "Be Happy" (Mary J. Blige song), 1993
- "Be Happy" (Dixie D'Amelio song), 2020
- "Be Happy", a song by Personz
- Be Happy (film), an Indian film directed by Remo D'Souza

== See also ==
- Don't Worry, Be Happy (disambiguation)
- "Sameach" ("Be Happy"), the Israeli entry in the Eurovision Song Contest 2000
