= Caldwell, North Carolina =

Caldwell, North Carolina can refer to:

- Caldwell, Mecklenburg County, North Carolina, an unincorporated community
- Caldwell, Orange County, North Carolina, an unincorporated community
