= Mandale =

Mandale may refer to:

- Mandale, North Carolina, in the United States
- Mandale, Ohio, in the United States
- Mandale, Thornaby in North Yorkshire, England
