= Edmund Harris =

Edmund Harris may refer to:

- Dud Harris (1903–1989), American football player, lawyer and businessman
- Edmund Robert Harris (1804–1877), British lawyer

== See also ==
- Edmund Harriss (born 1976), British mathematician, writer and artist
