= Leonidas Berry =

American physician (1902–1995)

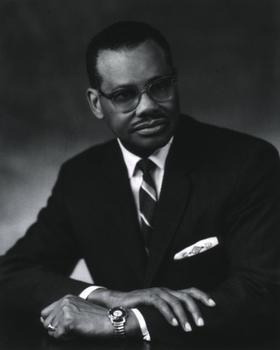
- Born: Leonidas Harris Berry; 20 July 1902; Woodsdale, North Carolina, U.S.
- Died: 4 December 1995 (aged 93); Chicago, Illinois, U.S.
- Education: Wilberforce University; University of Chicago; Rush Medical College; University of Illinois Medical School
- Scientific career
- Fields: Gastroscopy, Endoscopy
- Workplaces: National Medical Association

Leonidas Harris Berry (20 July 1902 – 4 December 1995) was an American and pioneer in gastroscopy and endoscopy. He served as the president of the National Medical Association from 1965 to 1966.

== Biography ==
Berry, a descendant of a self-liberated African who fought in the Civil War on the side of the Union army, was born in Woodsdale, Person County, North Carolina. After graduating from Wilberforce University in 1924, Berry moved to Chicago where he received a second B.S. degree from the University of Chicago, followed by a M.D. degree from the Rush Medical College of the university. In 1933, he also received a M.S. degree in Pathology from the University of Illinois Medical School.

After receiving his medical degree, Berry worked briefly at the Freedman's Hospital in Washington, D.C. And then at Cook County Hospital in Chicago, Illinois where he specialized in gastroenterology and retired in 1975 as chief of endoscopy and senior attending physician. Berry lived in Chicago since his return in 1931, working at the Michael Reese Hospital, Provident Hospital, and the University of Illinois Medical School.

In addition to his long and distinguished medical career, Berry was active in teaching, writing, and community public service. The latter included work in civil rights, on the racial problems of public health, and with the African Methodist Episcopal Church. He was also the author of a genealogical history of his family I Wouldn't Take Nothin' For My Journey: Two Centuries of an Afro-American Minister's Family published in 1981.

In the early 1950s Berry started during his presidency of Cook County Hospital's Physician Association the "Berry Plan", a citywide movement which provided medical counseling clinics for the prevention and follow-up care of young drug users. It was implemented and operated by the Illinois State Department of Health.

Berry's papers, which were given by him to the National Library of Medicine in 1986, centered on Berry's active professional and civic life. While the earliest copies of family material date from the 1890s, the bulk of the collection dates from the 1950s. Included are correspondence, photographs, newspaper clippings, publications, and lectures.

== Social Activism ==
Berry combined his pioneering medical career with social activism. In 1958, when the American College of Gastroenterology scheduled its annual meeting in New Orleans, Louisiana, Berry decided that he could not attend in good faith knowing that there was continued racial segregation in the city even after several key civil rights rulings. Berry wrote a letter to the society's chairman informing him that he would not be able to attend. He also made it a point to ask that the organization take a formal stance against segregation.

Several years later, in 1965, Berry became the president of the National Medical Association (NMA). Established in 1895, the NMA strived to fight discrimination in medical societies, medical schools, and hospitals. Similar to the way black physicians were excluded from the American Medical Association, white physicians were excluded from the National Medical Association. The segregation found within the organization is one thing Berry tried to address during his presidency. He launched a program aimed at integrating the NMA. Through this initiative, he appointed a special committee specifically tasked with seeking the membership of white doctors, and by 1966, one hundred white doctors had joined the organization. As a result of Berry's efforts, the American Medical Association (AMA) eventually agreed to end its racial exclusion practices in 1968. This, however, is not the only impact that Berry had on the American Medical Association. After the passing of the Civil Rights Act of 1964 and the congressional approval of Medicare, Berry revived a joint NMA-AMA Liaison Committee tasked with ending racial discrimination in hospitals and medicine. This committee headed by Berry put pressure chiefly on the AMA to deliver health care equality in the United States.

Committed to community service, Berry helped found the Chicago Council for Biomedical Careers in 1950. With a purpose of preparing Black American youth for careers in medicine, the Chicago Council for Biomedical Careers helped to encourage those interested in becoming physicians by providing them with the education and resources they would need to achieve that goal. In particular, the council funded health care conferences and career counseling sessions. That same year he led a citywide movement with a focus on rehabilitating young drug users. His work on this issue caught the attention of the Illinois state government, and he was allocated $90,000 to set up the "Berry Plan," which was operational from 1951 to 1958. Through this plan, he was able to establish medical counseling clinics in the Cook County jail as well as several Provident, Cook County, and Northwestern hospitals. These clinics were unique because rather than focusing on criminalization they paid particular attention to addressing both the psychological and physical needs of their patient population.

In addition, Berry dedicated himself to providing care to African Americans who previously did not have access to medical services. This dedication is what inspired him to organize the Flying Black Medics project alongside more than two dozen Chicago medical professionals. On Sunday, February 15, 1970, Berry and a team of nurses, pharmacists, and social workers among other healthcare specialists flew to Cairo, Illinois to see to the medical needs of the community. At the time, Cairo was in the midst of a race riot. However, that did not deter the Flying Black Medics from delivering needed care to the city's impoverished residents. Upon arriving in Cairo, they set up a medical clinic in the basement of Ward Chapel A.M.E. Church, where they distributed supplies and doctors examined each patient that walked through the church's doors. Another key element of the clinic involved lectures on health as well as panel discussions throughout the day. Some of the topics covered included "Established and Innovated Proposals for Improvement of Health Care in Cairo and Vicinity" and "Health Facilities for the Poor and Disadvantaged in Cairo and Alexander County."

Berry deeply believed that doctors had a duty to participate in civic affairs, so he fought fiercely against institutionalized racism during his lifetime. Thus, his willingness to speak out against and address the social injustices plaguing health care and the medical profession became not only a hallmark of his career but also of his life.

== Awards ==
- Rudolph Schindler Award 1977 from the American Society for Gastrointestinal Endoscopy
- Distinguished Service Award from the National Medical Association
- First Annual Clinical Achievement Award from the American College of Gastroenterology
- Freedom Award for Public Service from the Chicago Chapter of the NAACP
- Distinguished Alumni Award of Rush Medical College
