= Marty Ravellette =

American congenital amputee

- Born: December 18, 1939; Goodland, Indiana, U.S.
- Died: November 12, 2007 (aged 67); Eli Whitney, North Carolina, U.S.
- Resting place: Maplewood Cemetery
- Other name: Martin Lawrence Ravellette
- Known for: Armless and heroism

Marty Ravellette (December 18, 1939 – November 12, 2007) was born in Goodland, Indiana without arms. He attended Good Shepherd Rehabilitation in Allentown, Pennsylvania as an infant. The family then moved to Oceanside, California, where he was stopped for speeding in February 1963. The notoriety that resulted introduced him to JoBeth Johnson, who soon became his wife, and they moved to Klamath Falls, Oregon. After initially belonging to various denominations of Christianity, Ravellette and several of the family converted to the Baháʼí Faith between 1967 and 1970.

Later divorced, Ravellette moved to Teaneck, New Jersey and then Chapel Hill, North Carolina, where he rescued an elderly woman in a burning car and again won national recognition. His life is featured in a 2004 documentary, No Arms Needed: A Hero Among Us. Ravellette died in an auto accident in Eli Whitney, North Carolina three years later, in 2007.

== Early life and education ==
Marty Ravellette was the fourth child of the farm family of Ernest D. Ravellette and Laurene Ravellette (née Frohreich). He was born without arms. Faced with the challenge of this disability, his family was convinced to place him at the age of two months in the Good Shepherd Home, known today as Good Shepherd Home-Raker Center, in Allentown, Pennsylvania. The main practice at Good Shepherd was mainstreaming, and they trained Ravellette to use his legs and feet as arms and hands and to use an early prosthetic arm that he later stopped using. Ravellette was not the first armless person at the Good Shepherd Home – that was the musician Ray Meyers, who was an inspiration to Ravellette. Ravellette favored his left foot similar to left handed people. Ravellete was known to entertain people with his use of feet and body to do tricks.

While there, Ravellette attended Allentown public schools, starting with Jefferson Elementary School and then South Mountain Junior High. At age 11, Ravellette suffered burns from a fire accident. At age 16, Ravellette rejoined his family partly because he was a discipline problem, but he had in fact been initially barred from attending the public high school by the contemporary public school principle equating physical handicaps with mental handicaps. Ravellette's mother sued the school and produced transcripts from his public school years while living at Good Shepherd in Allentown.

While attending an Allentown public high school, Ravellete's rebellious and confrontational attitude built him a reputation. He "didn't back down," as the 2003 documentary on him cited when fellow students picked on him. However, he said, "For the first time, I felt like I was a cripple.". He credited his rebelliousness with not being afraid of work, an attribute he said he developed from working on a farm, where his family did not have running water. At one point, Ravellette's job was to fill water troughs from a hand pump. Ravellette recalled that he was turned down for a date to the high school prom and was told "Marty, when I want to get married I want to marry a man, not half a one."

After graduating circa 1957, Ravallette and his family moved to Oceanside, California and Ravellette ran away from home. In San Diego, Ravellette began to work in a variety of jobs. While he was unemployed in 1962, he drove from Los Angeles to his home in San Diego, where he was pulled over in a line of cars for speeding. After taking his driver's license, the officer noticed that Ravellette's foot had handed him the license. After Ravellette proved that he had a valid driver's license, the officer let Ravellette go with a citation. The incident was covered nationally by Associated Press and was read by JoBeth Johnson in Florida, who struck up a long-distance relationship with Ravellette that grew to a marriage after Ravellette moved to Klamath Falls, Oregon in 1963. They lived there a number of years; he, a member of the Church of Christ and she a Baptist. Together they had a daughter, Nancy (who was born with arms.) and a son who died as a child in a car accident.

In 1967, after attending community college, Ravellette moved to San Diego, where he lived in a boarding house, and performed parlor tricks. There, he met Ray Estes, who pointed out he was being used for amusement by those who were not his friends. In the same period, Estes noticed he was much more agile with his feet and remarked, "If God has seen fit to put you on earth without arms, it's up to the rest of us to accept you - not you to accept us." which Ravellette took as a turning point in his life. Estes and Ravellette would be long time friends. Estes had joined the Baháʼí Faith in 1966 and Ravellette also converted to the religion in 1967. Soon his mother and wife were visible serving in the religion and the Ravellettes had a second child May 21, 1970, after they moved to Eugene, Oregon. Marcus Husayn Ravellette - "Husayn" is a name recognized in Baháʼí circles as the birth-name of the founder, Baháʼu'lláh. However, on June 11, 1975, Marcus was killed in an automobile accident and buried as a Baháʼí. Marty and JoBeth divorced some time afterwards. Ravellete moved to Teaneck, New Jersey, where he became a grounds keeper at the Baháʼí property there. It was near there in Paramus, New Jersey that he met the woman who would be his next wife - Maree.

== North Carolina incidents ==
In 1991, Ravellette moved to Chapel Hill, North Carolina, where he won North Carolina's Disabled Citizen of the Year in 1994 while running a landscaping business, Hands on Landscaping. He again gained national fame when he rescued an elderly lady from a burning vehicle. He appeared on several national television shows, including Discovery Channel, which won an Award of Merit by Carolina Silver Reels and other shows though initially he had sought no publicity. Following this he had the opportunity to go back to Good Shepherd in Allentown, Pennsylvania for a reunion and began a period of reconnecting with his family while at the same time he met his future wife. He also began to speak publicly, including as a frequent guest at a journalism class of Chuck Stone at the University of North Carolina at Chapel Hill, and elsewhere, using stories of his life and physical challenges to underpin larger lessons on the benefits of diversity, justice, equality, and the unity of humankind. Inspired by his beliefs as a long-time member of the Baháʼí Faith, he often quoted one of his favorite lines from Baháʼí literature, "Noble have I created thee; why hast thou abased thyself" and observed that he was in a special position to serve humanity because of his differences, saying "Why was I born? Why was I born with no arms? Now serve mankind with no arms and not yourself!" he met Tony Melendez, a performer who similarly armless.

On November 12, 2007, Ravellette was in a car accident in southern Alamance County, North Carolina at Highway 87, where Eli Whitney, North Carolina is located. He failed to yield to an oncoming lumber truck and was ejected from the vehicle. He was not wearing a seatbelt because of his disability and died later that day at UNC Hospital just a few days after another Baháʼí was similarly killed in an accident at the same intersection. He is buried at Maplewood Cemetery.

== Awards and special appearances ==
- In 1988, he won the Governor's Trophy for an outstanding handicapped person in Oregon.
- In 1990, he appeared on the Sally Jessy Raphael show.
- He won the North Carolina's Disabled Citizen of the Year in 1994.
- In 1998, he appeared on The Today Show twice (October and another date) and The Rosie O'Donnell Show. and won the Robert P. Connelly Medal for Heroism from Kiwanis.
- On June 26, 1999, he was named the 28th honoree on the Wall of Honor at the Good Shepherd Home in Allentown, Pennsylvania and led the Fête del la Musique parade in Carrboro, North Carolina.
- In 2004, his life was featured in a documentary film, No Arms Needed: A Hero Among Us, produced and directed by Bill Hayes and written by Kirk Streb, and shown on the Discovery Channel on May 8, 2004 and elsewhere.
