= Comfort, North Carolina =

- Unincorporated community
- Location of Comfort in North Carolina Comfort, North Carolina (the United States)
- Coordinates: 35°00′21″N 77°30′32″W
- Country: United States
- State: North Carolina
- County: Jones
- Elevation: 52 ft (16 m)
- Time zone: UTC-5 (Eastern (EST))
  - Summer (DST): UTC-4 (EDT)
- ZIP code: 28522
- Area codes: 910, 472, 252
- FIPS code: ?
- GNIS feature ID: 982411

Comfort is an unincorporated community in Jones County, in eastern North Carolina, United States.

According to Christina Moon’s The Architectural History of Jones County, North Carolina, four early settlements developed in Jones County, North Carolina: Pollocksville, Trenton, Comfort, and Maysville. All but Comfort have incorporated.

“A third settlement, which may have been little more than a crossroads, was established in the eastern part of the county near present-day Comfort. Local still remember “Old Comfort,” the original community that developed around the Shine plantations. Several local stories offer explanations for the name Comfort; one account is linked to George Washington’s 1791 tour of the South. After spending the night at the Shine Inn, Washington was asked how he had slept. When he replied, “I slept in comfort,” the name became permanently linked to the community. Despite its small size. Comfort had a post office as early as 1826 and was recognized as a landmark in civil War officers’ reports."
