= Bent Creek, Yancey County, North Carolina =

Bent Creek, North Carolina
- Unincorporated community
- Location of Bent Creek in North Carolina Bent Creek, North Carolina (the United States)
- Coordinates: 36°00′45″N 82°23′09″W
- Country: United States
- State: North Carolina
- County: Yancey
- Elevation: 2,277 ft (694 m)
- Time zone: UTC-5 (Eastern (EST))
  - Summer (DST): UTC-4 (EDT)
- Area code: 828
- GNIS feature ID: 1019094

Bent Creek is an unincorporated community in the Ramseytown Township of Yancey County, North Carolina, United States.

== Geography ==
Bent Creek is located at 36°00′45″N 82°23′09″W (36.012611, -82.385967), about 16 miles (26 km) north-northeast of Mars Hill, about 23 miles (37 km) north-northeast of Weaverville, about 30 miles (48 km) north-northeast of Asheville, and about 355 miles (571 km) southwest of Washington, D.C. It lies 2277 feet (694 m) above sea level.
