= Dud Harris =

American football player (1903–1989)

- E. Dudley Harris, c. 19333

Profile
- Position: Tackle

Personal information
- Born: October 24, 1903; Quitsna, North Carolina, U.S.
- Died: February 13, 1989 (aged 85); Palm Springs, California, U.S.
- Listed height: 6 ft 2 in (1.88 m)
- Listed weight: 240 lb (109 kg)

Career information
- High school: East (OH)
- College: Ohio State

Career history
- Portsmouth Spartans (1930)
- Stats at Pro Football Reference

Edmund Dudley "Dud" Harris (October 24, 1903 – February 13, 1989) was an American football player, lawyer, and businessman.

Dudley was born in 1903 in Quitsna, North Carolina. He moved as a child to Columbus, Ohio, and attended East High School in that city. He enrolled at Marietta College where he competed in football, baseball, basketball, and track, and received 14 varsity letters. He was selected as captain of Marietta's football team as a junior in 1925. He received a law degree from Ohio State University, and also played college football there.

He played professional football in the National Football League (NFL) as a tackle for the Portsmouth Spartans during the 1930 and 1931 seasons. He appeared in 13 NFL games, nine as a starter.

He later became an attorney. He served for many years as assistant prosecuting attorney for Pike County, Ohio. In 1943, he attended the North Carolina Pre-Flight School in Chapel Hill, North Carolina. After the war, he moved to Oregon and eventually to California. He served as president of the Nutra-Vita Food Supplement Company from 1948 to 1955 and also served as chairman of the board.

In 1985, Harris was inducted into the Marietta College Hall of Fame. He died in 1989 at age 85 in Palm Springs, California.
