= Don't Worry =

Don't Worry may refer to:

- Don't Worry (album), a 1995 album by MC Magic
- Don't Worry, a 2009 album by Math the Band
- "Don't Worry" (Marty Robbins song), 1961
- "Don't Worry" (Modern Talking song), 1987
- "Don't Worry" (Kim Appleby song), 1990
- "Don't Worry" (Appleton song), 2003
- "Don't Worry" (Chingy song), featuring Janet Jackson, 2005
- "Don't Worry" (Madcon song), featuring Ray Dalton, 2015
- "Don't Worry" (Ace Wilder song), 2016
- "Don't Worry" (Drake song), 2026
- "Don't Worry", a song by Rebecca St. James from the album Transform, 2000
- "Don't Worry", a song by Aaliyah from the album I Care 4 U, 2002
- "Don't Worry", a song by the Game featuring Mary J. Blige from the album The Documentary, 2005
- "Don't Worry", a song by Moka Only from the album Magickal Weirdness, 2015

== See also ==
- Don't Worry Club, founded by Theodore Frelinghuysen Seward
- Don't Worry, Be Happy (disambiguation)
- "Don't Worry 'bout Me Baby", a country song by Janie Fricke
- "Three Little Birds", a song by Bob Marley & The Wailers often wrongly assumed to have “don't worry” in the title
