= Pigeonroost, North Carolina =

- Unincorporated community
- Location within North Carolina Location within the United States
- Coordinates: 36°04′09″N 82°17′47″W
- Country: United States
- State: North Carolina
- County: Mitchell
- Named for: The passenger pigeon
- Elevation: 2,234 ft (681 m)
- Time zone: UTC-5 (Eastern (EST))
  - Summer (DST): UTC-4 (EDT)
- ZIP Code: 28740 (Green Mountain)
- Area code: 828
- GNIS feature ID: 1021891

Pigeonroost is an unincorporated community in Mitchell County, North Carolina, United States.

== History ==
Pigeonroost takes its name from the extinct passenger pigeon which was once abundant throughout the region.
