= Durham and Southern Railway =

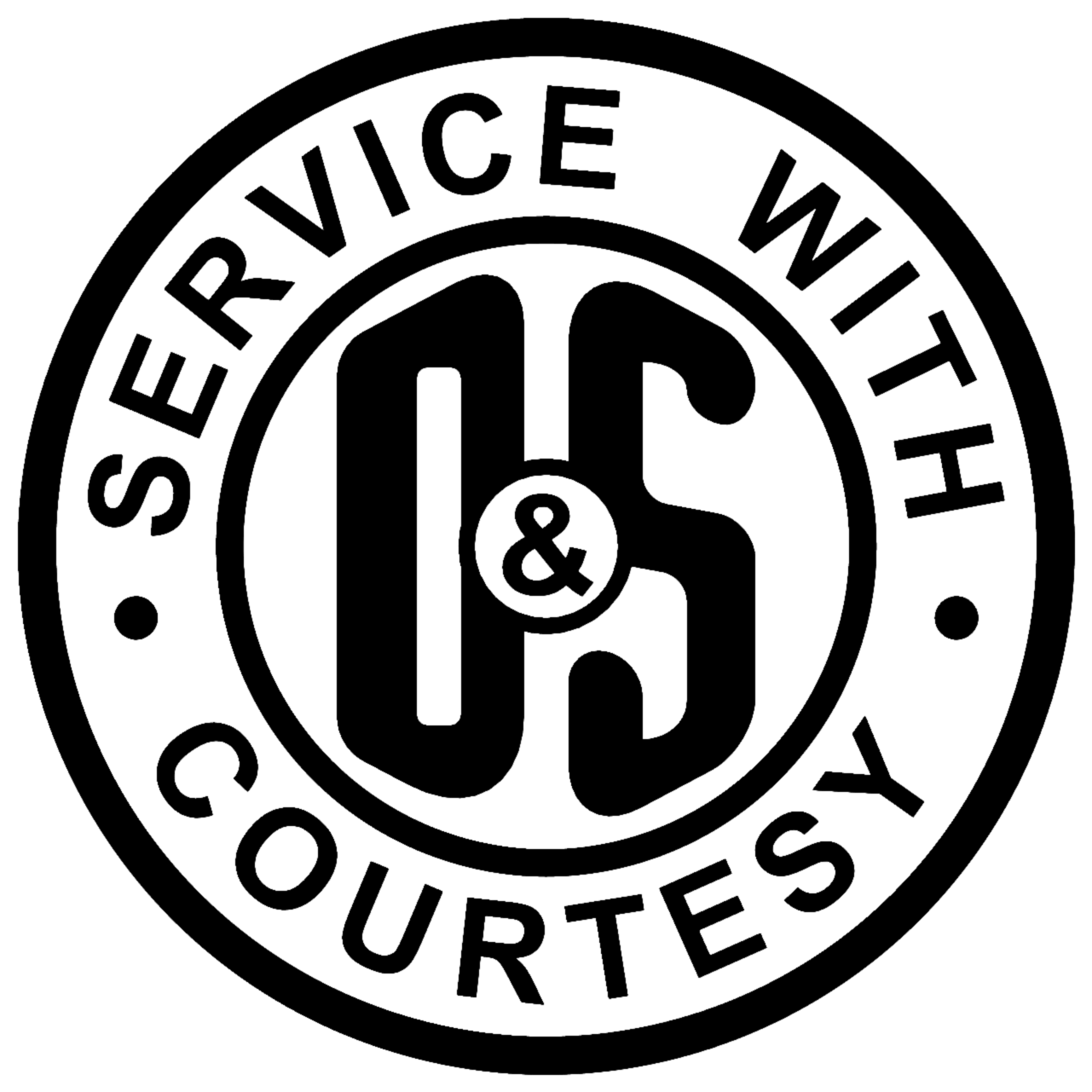
Logo

The Durham and Southern Railway operated 56.8 miles (91.4 km) of railroad from Dunn to Durham, North Carolina, USA. It was originally chartered as the Cape Fear and Northern Railway by Holly Springs resident George Benton Alford in 1892 and construction began in 1898. The name was changed to Durham and Southern in 1906. In 1979 it became part of the Seaboard Coast Line Railroad a predecessor to the CSX system. The tracks between Apex and Erwin Junction were removed in 1981 and the Dunn to Erwin segment (via Erwin Junction) was sold to the Aberdeen and Rockfish Railroad who operated it as a separate entity, the Dunn-Erwin Railway, until merging it into their operations in 1990. The closure of the cotton and denim mill in Erwin in 2000 led to the abandonment of these tracks and the conversion of the right-of-way to a rail trail. The Durham to Apex segment remains in use by CSX.

== Stations ==
Timetable #20, dated September 20, 1959 listed the following stations:

- Durham at Mile Post 0 (The D&S shared Durham's Union Station with several other railroads)
- "East Durham" at Mile Post 2.3 (Interchanging with and crossing the Southern Railway)
- "D.& S.C. Junction" at Mile Post 3.8 (Interchanging with and crossing Norfolk Southern Railway's leased Durham & South Carolina Railroad)
- "Few" at Mile Post 5.7
- Genlee at Mile Post 10.4
- Carpenter at Mile Post 14.2
- Upchurch at Mile Post 16.7
- Apex at Mile Post 20.7 (Interchanging with and crossing the Seaboard Air Line Railroad)
- Holly Springs at Mile Post 26.9
- "Wilbon" at Mile Post 30.5
- Fuquay-Varina at Mile Post 33.4 (Interchanging with and crossing the Norfolk Southern Railway)
- Kennebec at Mile Post 38.2
- Angier at Mile Post 40.4 (At one time the southern terminus of the Durham & Southern)
- Barclaysville at Mile Post 44.5
- Coats at Mile Post 48.8
- Turlington at Mile Post 51.8
- "Erwin Junction" at Mile Post 53.4, where a short branchline to Erwin began on the third leg of a wye track
- Erwin (site of Erwin Mills #2 from 1903 - 2000) was on a branchline 2.0 miles from Erwin Junction
- Dunn at Mile Post 56.8 (Interchanging with the Atlantic Coast Line Railroad)
