= Petersburg, Onslow County, North Carolina =

Petersburg, North Carolina
- Unincorporated community
- Location of Petersburg in North Carolina Petersburg, North Carolina (the United States)
- Country: United States
- State: North Carolina
- County: Onslow
- Elevation: 56 ft (17 m)
- Time zone: UTC-5 (Eastern (EST))
  - Summer (DST): UTC-4 (EDT)
- Area codes: 910, 472
- GNIS feature ID: 1021876

Petersburg is an unincorporated community off Comfort Road, in Onslow County, North Carolina, United States, north-northeast of Richlands. It is part of the Jacksonville, North Carolina Metropolitan Statistical Area.
