= Don't Worry, Be Happy (disambiguation) =

"Don't Worry, Be Happy" is a song by Bobby McFerrin.

Don't Worry, Be Happy may also refer to:

- Don't Worry, Be Happy (album), a 1988 compilation album by Bobby McFerrin
- Don't Worry Be Happy (Wanda Jackson album), a 1989 studio album by Wanda Jackson
- "Don't Worry Be Happy" (Guy Sebastian song), a song released in 2011
- Don't Worry Be Happy (play), a Marathi drama by Mihir Rajda
- "Don't worry, be happy", a famous quote by Meher Baba

== See also ==
- Don't Be Happy... Just Worry, 1992 EP by The Wildhearts
- Worry (disambiguation)
- No worries (disambiguation)
