= Beaver Creek, Ashe County, North Carolina =

Beaver Creek
- Unincorporated community
- Location of Beaver Creek within North Carolina
- Coordinates: 36°22′41″N 81°29′53″W
- Country: United States
- State: North Carolina
- County: Ashe
- Elevation: 3,041 ft (927 m)
- Time zone: UTC-5 (EST)
  - Summer (DST): UTC-4 (EDT)
- ZIP code: 28694
- Area codes: 336, 743
- FIPS code: 37-37009
- GNIS feature ID: 1019027

Beaver Creek is an unincorporated community in Ashe County, North Carolina, United States.

== History ==
The Virginia–Carolina Railway once had service through this area. The Virginia–Carolina Railway was an interstate railroad in southwestern Virginia and northwestern North Carolina. It ran from Abingdon in Washington County, Virginia to Todd in Ashe County. The line charted a complicated course through the mountains of the area, crossing the Blue Ridge near Mount Rogers.

== Geography ==
Beaver Creek is located in south-central Ashe County, south of West Jefferson. The elevation of Beaver Creek is 3,041 feet (927 m).

== Transportation ==
US 221 and NC 194 are the primary routes within Beaver Creek.
