= Dixie, North Carolina =

- Unincorporated community
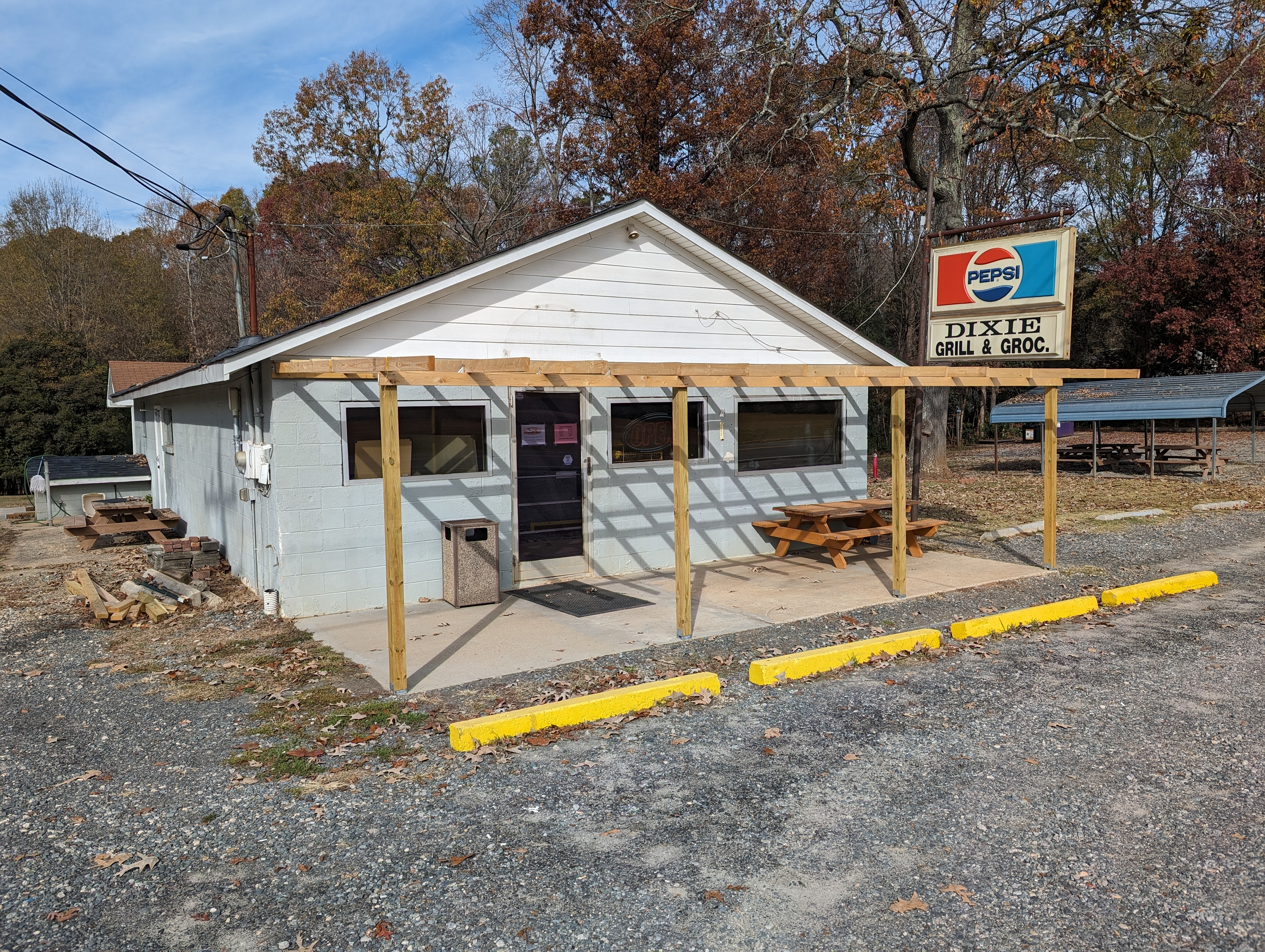
- The Dixie Grill & Grocery

- Location within North Carolina Location within the United States
- Coordinates: 35°12′12″N 80°58′4″W
- Country: United States
- State: North Carolina
- County: Mecklenburg
- Named for: The song "Dixie"
- Elevation: 742 ft (226 m)
- Time zone: UTC-5 (Eastern (EST))
  - Summer (DST): UTC-4 (EDT)
- ZIP Code: 28278 (Charlotte)
- Area codes: 704, 980
- GNIS feature ID: 984219

Dixie is an unincorporated community in western Mecklenburg County, North Carolina, United States. Centered at the intersection of Dixie River Road and Wallace Neel Road; the rural community has shrunk since the start of the 21st century with the expansion of Charlotte Douglas International Airport and the westward expansion of Charlotte.

The community is also referred as Dixie-Berryhill, a combination of Dixie and the Berryhill township it resides in. This was the name given by City of Charlotte officials in 1989, despite the area not being part of the city at the time.

== History ==
Settlement of the area began in the mid-18th century, attracted by the rich topsoil and access to the Catawba River. The community that developed in the area was originally known as Collins Crossroad, named for a store at the location. Around 1836–46, it then became known as Equality. The name changed again in 1883, when a community band was formed and the favorite tune locally being "Dixie". In 1885, the Dixie Post Office was established, but only operated for 17 years before closing in 1902.

In 2007, Charlotte Douglas International Airport expanded west to build a third parallel runway, which moved the intersection of Dixie River Road and Wallace Neel Road to its current location, adjacent to Interstate 485. In 2016, Crescent Communities announced the plan to developed 1,400 acres (570 ha) for a planned community intended to contain thousands of homes, hotels, and commercial space to the area. Called the River District, its groundbreaking and construction began in 2023.

== See also ==
- List of unincorporated communities in North Carolina
