= Blackwood, North Carolina =

- Unincorporated community
- Location of Blackwood in North Carolina Blackwood, North Carolina (the United States)
- Coordinates: 35°59′33″N 79°04′20″W
- Country: United States
- State: North Carolina
- County: Orange
- Elevation: 482 ft (147 m)
- Time zone: UTC-5 (Eastern (EST))
  - Summer (DST): UTC-4 (EDT)
- Area code: 919
- GNIS feature ID: 981568

Blackwood is an unincorporated community in Orange County, North Carolina, United States. It is located on North Carolina Highway 86, north of Eubanks, and is next to a train line running from Hillsborough to Carrboro.

The primary commercial area of Blackwood is at the intersection of Hwy 86 South and Mill House Rd. to the west and Mt. Sinai Rd. to the east. Allen & Son Barbecue, located by the train track, was an institution for many UNC students and alumni before it closed in 2018.
