= Ogreeta, North Carolina =

Unincorporated community in North Carolina, US

Coordinates: 35°09′12″N 84°08′29″W

Ogreeta is an unincorporated community in Cherokee County, in the U.S. state of North Carolina.

== History ==
Variant names are "Ogreta" and "Ogretta". A post office called Ogreeta was established in 1880, and remained in operation until 1927. "Ogreeta" most likely is a name derived from an unidentified Native American language; the meaning is unknown. Joe Brown Highway through Ogreeta was paved in the early 1950s. Electricity arrived in Ogreeta in 1947; telephone service came in the mid-1960s. The earliest school in Ogreeta was a log structure which also served as the community's church. By 1940, Ogreeta's one-teacher school had an enrollment of 17 students and taught grades 1-7. Ogreeta's school closed when a new brick school opened in Unaka in 1952.
