= Iron Duff, North Carolina =

Ironduff, North Carolina
- Populated place
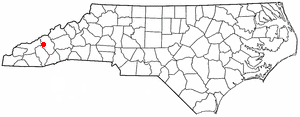
- Location of Iron Duff, North Carolina
- Coordinates: 35.579°N 82.970°W
- Country: United States
- State: North Carolina
- County: Haywood
- Elevation: 2,592 ft (790 m)
- Time zone: UTC-5 (Eastern (EST))
  - Summer (DST): UTC-4 (EDT)
- ZIP code: 28785
- Area code: 828
- GNIS feature ID: 1020894

Iron Duff (also Aaron Duff, or Ironduff) is an unincorporated community in Haywood County, North Carolina, United States.

== Geography ==
Iron Duff is located at latitude 35.579 and longitude -82.970 The elevation is 2,592 feet (790 m).

== History ==
Prior to European colonization, the area that is now Iron Duff was inhabited by the Cherokee people and other Indigenous peoples for thousands of years. The Cherokee in Western North Carolina are known as the Eastern Band of Cherokee Indians, a federally recognized tribe.
