= Epsom, North Carolina =

- Unincorporated community
- Location within North Carolina Location within the United States
- Coordinates: 36°14′44″N 78°19′43″W
- Country: United States
- State: North Carolina
- County: Vance, Franklin
- Elevation: 486 ft (148 m)
- Time zone: UTC-5 (Eastern (EST))
  - Summer (DST): UTC-4 (EDT)
- Area code: 919
- GNIS feature ID: 1020165

Epsom is an unincorporated community in northern Franklin County and southern Vance County in North Carolina, United States. It is located on the county line, north-northwest of Louisburg and southeast of Henderson, at an elevation of 486 feet (148 m). The primary cross roads where the community is located are N.C. Highway 39, Epsom-Rocky Ford Road (SR 1003) and New Bethel Church Road (SR 1523). There was a post office in Epsom from September 27, 1887, to March 31, 1908. The first postmaster was Simon W. Duke.
