= Barrett, North Carolina =

Unincorporated community in North Carolina, U.S.

Barrett
- Unincorporated community
- Location within North Carolina
- Coordinates: 36.527°N 80.968°W
- Country: United States
- State: North Carolina
- County: Alleghany
- Time zone: UTC-5 (EST)
  - Summer (DST): UTC-4 (EDT)
- ZIP Code: 28623
- Area codes: 336, 743

Barrett is an unincorporated community in Alleghany County, North Carolina, United States.

== Geography ==
Barrett is located in northeastern Alleghany County. The community is bordered to the north by Virginia and to the east by Surry County.

Barrett Road is the primary route within the community.

The ZIP Code for Barrett is 28623.
