= Purnell, North Carolina =

Purnell
- Unincorporated community
- Interactive map of Purnell
- Coordinates: 36°00′44″N 78°33′12″W
- Country: United States
- State: North Carolina
- Counties: Wake
- Elevation: 469 ft (143 m)
- Time zone: UTC-5 (Eastern (EST))
  - Summer (DST): UTC-4 (EDT)
- ZIP codes: 27587
- GNIS feature ID: 1024240

Purnell is an unincorporated community in Wake County, North Carolina, United States, located 4 mi (6.4 km) northwest of Wake Forest.

Purnell and Bud Smith Roads are at the center of the community.

Nearby neighborhoods are Kensington Manor, Crenshaw Manor, Galloway, and Hillcrest Farms.
