= Eubanks, North Carolina =

Eubanks
- Unincorporated community
- Location within the state of North Carolina
- Coordinates: 35°58′12″N 79°4′32″W
- Country: United States
- State: North Carolina
- County: Orange
- Time zone: UTC-5 (Eastern (EST))
  - Summer (DST): UTC-4 (EDT)
- GNIS feature ID: 1006198

Eubanks is an unincorporated community in Orange County, North Carolina, United States, located north of downtown Chapel Hill and south of Blackwood Station. The Orange County landfill is part of the Eubanks area; however, most of the area is rural.
