= Kennebec, North Carolina =

Unincorporated community in North Carolina, US

Coordinates: 35°32′25″N 78°44′50″W

Kennebec is a small unincorporated community in southern Wake County, North Carolina, United States, along the border of Harnett County. The community is situated along North Carolina Highway 55 and is the site of the Fuquay-Angier Airfield (Kennebec Flying Club). Much of the area has been recently annexed by the Harnett County town of Angier. Kennebec was named for Kennebec County, Maine (Powell 1968, p. 262). The community was also a stop on the former Durham and Southern Railway.
