= Poplar Springs, Surry County, North Carolina =

Unincorporated community in North Carolina, US

Coordinates: 36°18′40″N 80°49′59″W

Poplar Springs is an unincorporated community in southwestern Surry County, North Carolina, United States, situated on Springs Road between the town of Elkin and the community of Mulberry. Prominent landmarks include Poplar Springs Baptist Church and cemetery. The community is serviced by State Road Volunteer Fire Department, founded in 1960. Also located in the area is Cedar Brook Country Club, popular for golf, tennis, and swimming for area citizens. Businesses in the area include: Poplar Springs Grocery and Service, Tracy's Garage, Elk Electric Motors, L & A Emergency Equipment, Inc., Watson Metals, and Pine Log Company.
