= Hopkins, North Carolina =

- Unincorporated community
- Location of Hopkins in North Carolina Hopkins, North Carolina (the United States)
- Coordinates: 35°53′06″N 78°21′08″W
- Country: United States
- State: North Carolina
- County: Wake
- Elevation: 344 ft (105 m)
- Time zone: UTC-5 (Eastern (EST))
  - Summer (DST): UTC-4 (EDT)
- ZIP code: 27597
- Area code: 919
- GNIS feature ID: 1020832

Hopkins is an unincorporated community in eastern Wake County, North Carolina, United States. The center of the community lies at the crossroads of Hopkins Chapel Road and Fowler Road, near North Carolina Highway 96, about three miles north of the town of Zebulon.
