= Howellsville, North Carolina =

- Unincorporated community
- Location of Howellsville within North Carolina
- Coordinates: 34°41′49″N 78°55′01″W
- Country: United States
- State: North Carolina
- County: Robeson
- Elevation: 141 ft (43 m)
- Time zone: UTC-5 (EST)
  - Summer (DST): UTC-4 (EDT)
- Area codes: 910, 472
- GNIS feature ID: 1006248

Howellsville is an unincorporated community located in Robeson County, North Carolina, United States.

== Geography ==
Howellsville is located in northeastern Robeson County. The elevation of the community is 141 feet (43 m). It appears on the Northeast Lumberton U.S. Geological Survey Map.
