= Selwin, North Carolina =

- Unincorporated community
- Location within the state of North Carolina
- Coordinates: 36°20′6″N 76°35′13″W
- Country: United States
- State: North Carolina
- County: Chowan and Gates
- Elevation: 33 ft (10 m)
- Time zone: UTC-5 (Eastern (EST))
  - Summer (DST): UTC-4 (EDT)
- GNIS feature ID: 1025688

Selwin is an unincorporated community in Chowan and Gates Counties in the U.S. state of North Carolina. Its elevation is 33 feet (10 m).
