= Quitsna, North Carolina =

Unincorporated community in North Carolina, US

Coordinates: 35°58′12″N 77°04′02″W

Quitsna is an unincorporated community in southern Bertie County, North Carolina, United States, in the coastal plain, approximately 202 miles (325 km) from Washington, D.C. It is located on Quitsna Road, and Indian Woods Road, west of Grabtown. Indian Woods Baptist Church is located in Quitsna.
