= Bear Creek, Onslow County, North Carolina =

Unincorporated community in Onslow County, North Carolina, U.S.

- Unincorporated community
- Location within the U.S. state of North Carolina
- Coordinates: 34.66°N 77.18°W
- Country: United States
- State: North Carolina
- County: Onslow
- Time zone: UTC-5 (EST)
  - Summer (DST): UTC-4 (EDT)
- ZIP Code: 28539
- Area codes: 252, 910, 472

Bear Creek is an unincorporated community in Onslow County, North Carolina, United States.

== Geography ==
Bear Creek is located in southeastern Onslow County, near Hubert.

The ZIP Code for Bear Creek is 28539.

== Population ==
In 2024, the population estimate for ZIP Code 28539 was 20,280.
