= Cognac, North Carolina =

- Unincorporated community
- Location within North Carolina Location within the United States
- Country: United States
- State: North Carolina
- County: Richmond
- Elevation: 394 ft (120 m)
- Time zone: UTC-5 (Eastern (EST))
  - Summer (DST): UTC-4 (EDT)
- Area codes: 910, 472
- GNIS feature ID: 1019718

Cognac is an unincorporated community in Richmond County, North Carolina, United States.

== History ==
A post office called Cognac was established in 1900, and remained in operation until 1953. The community was named after the liquor cognac, since this is a wine-growing district.
