= Yorktown, North Carolina =

Yorktown
- Unincorporated place
- Interactive map of Yorktown
- Coordinates: 36.0576369°N 80.0692087°W
- Country: United States
- State: North Carolina
- County: Forsyth
- Elevation: 288 m (945 ft)

Yorktown is a populated place in Forsyth County in the U.S. state of North Carolina. It lies 10 kilometres (6 mi) east of the county seat of Winston-Salem.
