= Thurmond, North Carolina =

Unincorporated community in North Carolina, US

Coordinates: 36°21′58″N 80°55′44″W

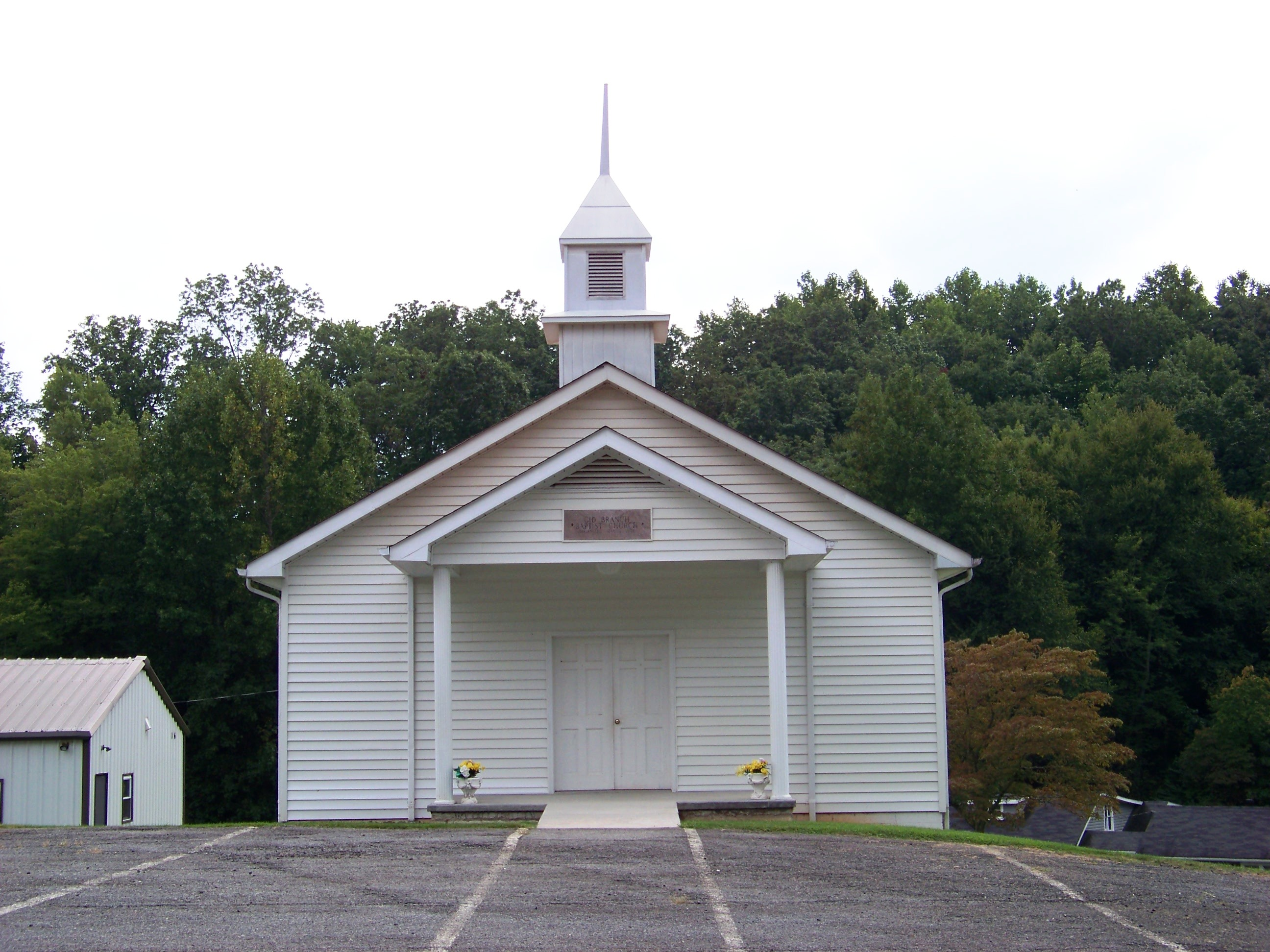
Gid Branch Baptist Church

Thurmond is an unincorporated community in north eastern Wilkes County, North Carolina, United States, along the border with Surry County.

== Location ==
The community lies between U.S. Route 21 and the Mitchell River. It is located in the foothills of the Blue Ridge Mountains. Thurmond has an elevation of 1,401 feet above sea level.

== Demographics ==
Thurmond's Zip Code Tabulation Area (Zip Code 28683) has a population of about 1,611 as of the 2000 census. The population is 50.8% male and 49.2% female. About 98.1% of the population is white, 0.1% African-American, 0.4% American Indian, 0.9% Hispanic, 0.1% native Hawaiians or other Pacific Islanders, and 0.7% of other races. 0.6% of people are two or more races.

The median household income is $38,023 with 14.2% of the population living below the poverty line. Thurmond's Religion is mainly Southern Baptist and United Methodist. There are several Baptist Churches: Gid Branch Baptist Church, Union Hill Baptist Church, Union Hill Missionary Baptist Church and Charity Hill Baptist Church. The Methodist Church is White Rock United Methodist Church.
