= Poplar, North Carolina =

- Unincorporated community
- Location within North Carolina Location within the United States
- Coordinates: 36°05′15″N 82°20′11″W
- Country: United States
- State: North Carolina
- County: Mitchell
- Named for: A poplar tree
- Elevation: 2,224 ft (678 m)
- Time zone: UTC-5 (Eastern (EST))
  - Summer (DST): UTC-4 (EDT)
- ZIP Code: 28740 (Green Mountain)
- Area code: 828
- GNIS feature ID: 1022036

Poplar is an unincorporated community in Mitchell County, North Carolina, United States. The community is located along North Carolina Highway 197 (NC 197), at the banks of the Hollow Poplar Creek and between the southern slopes of the Unaka Range and the North Toe River. It is also the last community along the CSX Blue Ridge Subdivision before crossing into Tennessee towards Erwin.

== History ==
The community was named after an enormous poplar tree that once stood in the area; hollowed out. It supposedly served not only as a barn for livestock, but also as a shelter for Confederate Soldiers traveling through the area during the American Civil War. Originally called "Hollow Poplar," a post office was established in 1872 of the same name. In 1892, both the community and post office were named as Poplar. In 1902, the South & Western Railroad established rail service in the area (today CSX). In 1949, the Post Office closed and combined with the Relief Post Office.
