= Liberty, Rowan County, North Carolina =

Liberty, North Carolina
- Unincorporated community
- Location within North Carolina
- Coordinates: 35.5812505°N 80.3356122°W
- Country: United States
- State: North Carolina
- County: Rowan
- Elevation: 751 ft (229 m)
- Time zone: UTC-5 (Eastern (EST))
  - Summer (DST): UTC-4 (EDT)
- ZIP code: 28071
- Area code: 704
- GNIS feature ID: 1021141

Liberty is an unincorporated community in Rowan County, North Carolina, United States.
