= Fonville (surname) =

Fonville is a surname. Notable people with the surname include:

- Bryson Fonville (born 1994), American basketball player
- Chad Fonville (born 1971), American baseball player
- Charlie Fonville (1927–1994), American track and field athlete
- John Fonville, American flutist and composer
- Lester Fonville (born 1963), American basketball player
- Richard H. Fonville (1882-1954), American politician
