= Grabtown, Bertie County, North Carolina =

Grabtown, North Carolina
- Unincorporated community
- Location within North Carolina Location within the United States
- Coordinates: 35°57′25.6″N 77°01′58.0″W
- Country: United States
- State: North Carolina
- County: Bertie County
- Elevation: 23 ft (7.0 m)
- Time zone: UTC-5 (Eastern (EST))
  - Summer (DST): UTC-4 (EDT)
- GNIS feature ID: 1023993

Grabtown is an unincorporated community in Bertie County, North Carolina, United States.

== See also ==
- List of unincorporated communities in North Carolina
- Birthplace of legendary Hollywood Actress Ava Gardner,1922
