= Genlee, North Carolina =

- Unincorporated community
- Location within the state of North Carolina
- Coordinates: 35°52′16″N 78°53′29″W
- Country: United States
- State: North Carolina
- County: Durham
- Time zone: UTC-5 (Eastern (EST))
  - Summer (DST): UTC-4 (EDT)

Genlee is an unincorporated community in southern Durham County, North Carolina, United States along the Durham and Wake County line. The community is centered on the intersection of North Carolina Highway 55 and South Alston Avenue, near the old Durham and Southern Railway.

The community was originally named Togo, after a Japanese city, in 1904 when the first railroad depot was established. The name of the community was changed to Genlee to honor Confederate General Robert E. Lee following the Japanese attack at Pearl Harbor, Hawaii in 1941 (Powell 1968, p. 188).
