= Safe, North Carolina =

Unincorporated community in North Carolina, US

Safe
- Unincorporated community
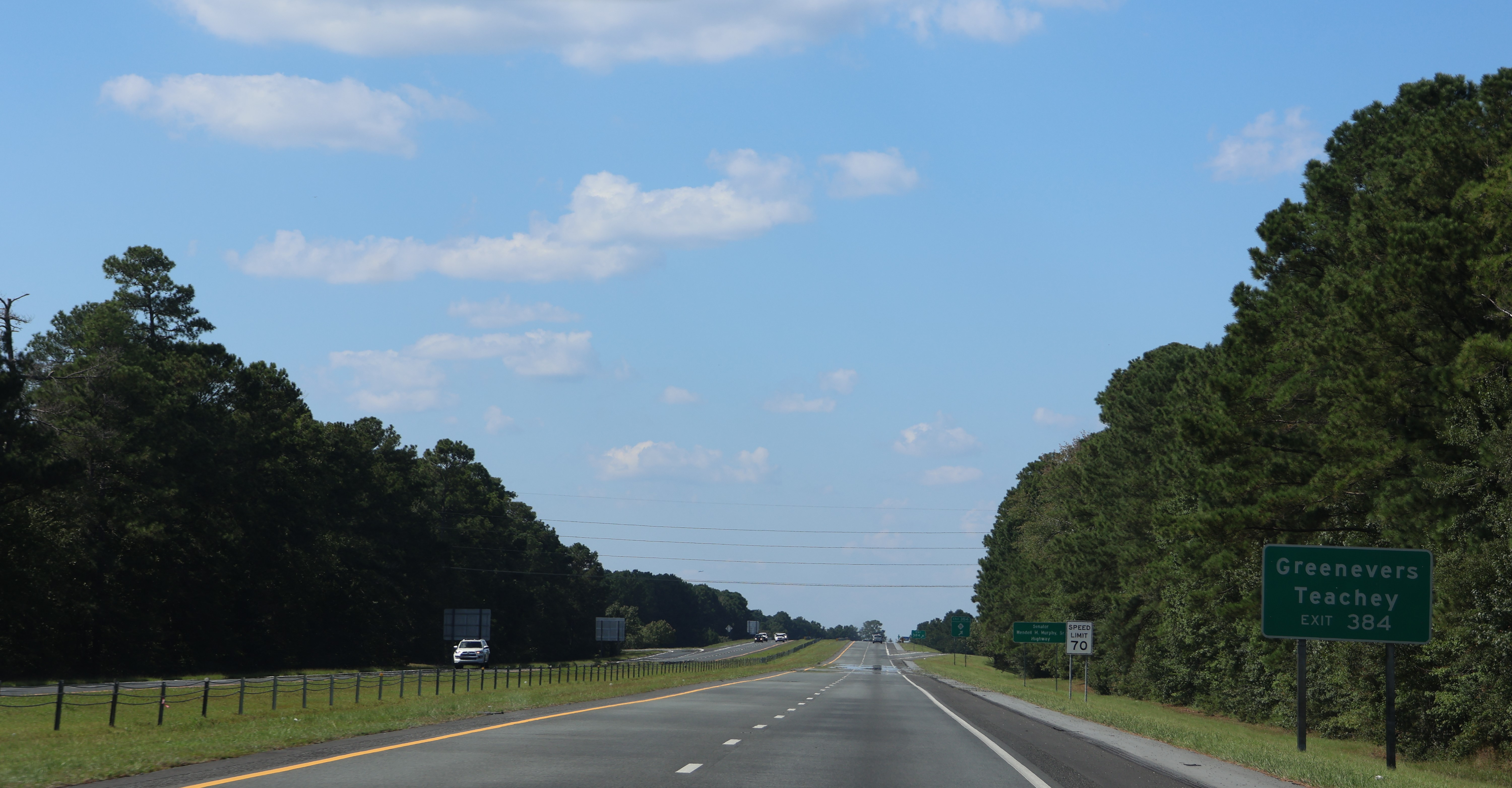
- Interstate 40 near Safe

- Location within the U.S. state of North Carolina
- Coordinates: 34.74°N 78.06°W
- Country: United States
- State: North Carolina
- County: Duplin

Population
  - Estimate (2023): 573
- Time zone: UTC-5 (EST)
  - Summer (DST): UTC-4 (EDT)
- ZIP Code: 28466
- Area codes: 910, 472

Safe is an unincorporated community in Duplin County, North Carolina, United States.

== Geography ==
Safe is located in southwestern Duplin County, near Wallace. The community is bordered to the south by Pender County and to the west by Sampson County.

NC 41 is the primary highway within Safe. Interstate 40 and US 117 are located to the east of the community.

The ZIP Code for Safe is 28466.

== Population ==
In 2023, the population estimate was 573.
