= Doolie, North Carolina =

- Populated place
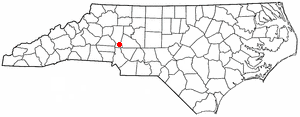
- Location of Doolie, North Carolina
- Coordinates: 35.602°N 80.897°W
- Country: United States
- State: North Carolina
- County: Iredell
- Time zone: UTC-5 (Eastern (EST))
  - Summer (DST): UTC-4 (EDT)
- Area codes: 704, 980
- GNIS feature ID: 984269

Doolie is a populated place within the town of Mooresville in Iredell County, North Carolina, United States.

== Geography ==
Doolie is located at latitude 35.602 and longitude −80.897. The elevation of Doolie is 869 feet.
