= Wakefield, North Carolina =

Coordinates: 35°50′31″N 78°18′25″W

Wakefield is a former unincorporated community and current area within the Zebulon, North Carolina, United States, town limits in extreme eastern Wake County. It is centered on Pearces Road (SR 1001) between Pippin Road (SR 2337) and Arendell Avenue (NC 96), northeast of the center of Zebulon. It was annexed by Zebulon in 1997.
