= Providence, McDowell County, North Carolina =

Providence, North Carolina
- Unincorporated community
- Location within North Carolina Location within the United States
- Coordinates: 35°38′11″N 82°03′04″W
- Country: United States
- State: North Carolina
- County: McDowell
- Elevation: 1,519 ft (463 m)
- Time zone: UTC-5 (Eastern (EST))
  - Summer (DST): UTC-4 (EDT)
- ZIP Code: 28752 (Marion)
- Area code: 828
- GNIS feature ID: 1022092

Providence is an unincorporated community in McDowell County, North Carolina, United States. Providence is 4 miles (6 km) southwest of Marion.
