= Caldwell, Mecklenburg County, North Carolina =

Caldwell, North Carolina
- Unincorporated community
- Location of Caldwell in North Carolina
- Coordinates: 35°27′13″N 80°50′34″W
- Country: United States
- State: North Carolina
- County: Mecklenburg
- Named for: Joseph Caldwell
- Elevation: 850 ft (260 m)
- Time zone: UTC-5 (Eastern (EST))
  - Summer (DST): UTC-4 (EDT)
- ZIP Codes: 28031 (Cornelius); 28078 (Huntersville)
- Area code: 704
- FIPS code: 37-37119
- GNIS feature ID: 982413

Caldwell is an unincorporated community in northern Mecklenburg County, North Carolina, United States.

== Geography ==
Caldwell is located at 35°27′13″N 80°50′34″W (35.453749, -80.842851), south of the town of Davidson on State Highway 115. It lies 850 feet (259 m) above sea level. The area now sits on the border between the towns of Huntersville and Cornelius.
