= Oval, North Carolina =

Unincorporated community in North Carolina, US

Coordinates: 36°19′49″N 81°29′17″W

Oval is an unincorporated community in Ashe County, North Carolina, United States.

== History ==
A post office called Oval was established in 1898, and remained in operation until 1953. The origin of the name "Oval" is obscure.
