= Bee Log, North Carolina =

Unincorporated community in North Carolina, US

Coordinates: 35°59′04″N 82°24′31″W

Bee Log is an unincorporated community in Yancey County, North Carolina, United States. The community is located along Bald Mountain Creek, approximately one mile upstream (southwest) of Lewisburg on the Cane River.

== History ==
A post office called Bee Log was established in 1874, and remained in operation until 1962. The name sometimes was spelled "Beelog". The origin of the name "Bee Log" is obscure.
