= Bowman Bluff, North Carolina =

Unincorporated community in North Carolina, US

Coordinates: 35°18′13″N 82°33′42″W

Bowman Bluff is an unincorporated community in Henderson County, in the U.S. state of North Carolina.

== History ==
A post office called Bowman's Bluff was in operation between 1856 and 1904. The community probably derives its name from Mary Bowman.
