= Barclaysville, North Carolina =

Unincorporated community in North Carolina, US

Coordinates: 35°28′08″N 78°41′39″W

Barclaysville is an unincorporated community located in Harnett County, North Carolina, United States, near the town of Angier. It is a part of the Dunn Micropolitan Area, which is also a part of the greater Raleigh–Durham–Cary Combined Statistical Area (CSA) as defined by the United States Census Bureau.

The community was a stop on the defunct Durham and Southern Railway and was formerly the site of Barclay-Barbee naval stores industry.
