= Pendleton, North Carolina =

- Unincorporated community
- Location within North Carolina Location within the United States
- Coordinates: 36°28′18″N 77°11′55″W
- Country: United States
- State: North Carolina
- County: Northampton
- Elevation: 79 ft (24 m)
- Time zone: UTC-5 (Eastern (EST))
  - Summer (DST): UTC-4 (EDT)
- ZIP code: 27862
- Area code: 252
- GNIS feature ID: 1021860

Pendleton is an unincorporated community in Northampton County, North Carolina, United States. The community is located on North Carolina Highway 35 between Conway to the south and Severn to the north. Pendleton has a post office with ZIP code 27862.
