= Lakeview, Alamance County, North Carolina =

Lakeview, North Carolina
- Unincorporated community
- Location within North Carolina Location within the United States
- Coordinates: 36°09′18″N 79°25′24″W
- Country: United States
- State: North Carolina
- County: Alamance
- Elevation: 646 ft (197 m)
- Time zone: UTC-5 (Eastern (EST))
  - Summer (DST): UTC-4 (EDT)
- Area code: 336
- GNIS feature ID: 1021085

Lakeview is an unincorporated community in Alamance County, North Carolina, United States. The community is 4.2 miles (6.8 km) north of Burlington.
