= Grabtown, Johnston County, North Carolina =

Grabtown, North Carolina
- Unincorporated community
- Interactive map of Grabtown, North Carolina
- Coordinates: 35.408°N 78.228°W
- Country: United States
- State: North Carolina
- County: Johnston
- Elevation: 26 ft (7.9 m)
- Time zone: UTC-5 (Eastern (EST))
  - Summer (DST): UTC-4 (EDT)
- GNIS feature ID: 1023993

Grabtown is an unincorporated community in Johnston County, North Carolina, United States. Grabtown is located 9 miles (14 km) southeast of Smithfield. It is included in the Research Triangle Metropolitan Statistical Area.

== Notable people ==
- Ava Gardner (1922–1990), born in Grabtown, American actress

== See also ==
- List of unincorporated communities in North Carolina
