= Woodsdale, North Carolina =

Unincorporated community in the United States

Woodsdale is an unincorporated community in Person County, in the U.S. state of North Carolina. As of 2020, it has a population of 1,350.

== Geography ==
Woodsdale is located at 36.489863°N latitude and -78.9597327°W longitude. Its elevation sits at 515 feet (157 m). It is situated 3.4 miles southwest of Bethel Hill. It is also 7.2 miles north of Roxboro.

== Demographics ==
Racial diversity among residents includes 65% White 27% Black, 2% Hispanic and 6% are from two unspecified races. 92% of residents are homeowners while the remaining 8% rent. 24% of residents are age 65 and older. 19% of residents are between 55 and 64, 16% are between the ages of 45 and 54. 12% of adults are between the ages of 35 and 44 and 8% are between the ages of 25 and 34. 9% of residents are between ages of 18 and 24. 12% of children living in the area are usually no older than age 10. 55% of residents living in the area are married. 2% of men are widowed and 2% of women are widowed. 12% of men are divorced and 13% of women are divorced.

=== Economics ===
22% of households earn between $100,000 and $200,000. 46% of households earn between $50,000 and $100,000 (reportedly $64,525). 32% of households earn under $50,000.

== Education ==
5% of residents have less than a high school diploma. 38% of residents have a high school diploma or equivalent, 31% of residents have some college experience or an associate degree. 26% of residents have a bachelor's degree.

The community is served by the Person County School District. Private schools include the Roxboro Christian Academy and the preschool Sneed Academy, both located in Roxboro, NC.
