= No worries (disambiguation) =

"No worries" is an expression in Australian English.

No worries may also refer to:

- "No Worries" (Simon Webbe song), 2005
- "No Worries" (Lil Wayne song), 2012
- "No Worries" (Disciples and David Guetta song), 2016
- No Worries (film), a 1994 film directed by David Elfick
- "No Worries," a song by Pogo
