= Eli Whitney, North Carolina =

Eli Whitney
- Unincorporated community
- Location within the state of North Carolina
- Coordinates: 35°54′25″N 79°18′26″W
- Country: United States
- State: North Carolina
- County: Alamance
- Elevation: 518 ft (158 m)
- Time zone: UTC-5 (Eastern (EST))
  - Summer (DST): UTC-4 (EDT)
- ZIP codes: 27253
- GNIS feature ID: 1020119

Eli Whitney is an unincorporated community in southeastern Alamance County, North Carolina, United States. It is located at the intersection of North Carolina Highway 87, and Greensboro-Chapel Hill Road. To the south is Mandale and to the west is Snow Camp. The United States Postal Service considers Eli Whitney part of the Graham delivery area.

Eli Whitney gained its name from the inventor of the cotton gin, Eli Whitney. Though the towns' history is not directly related to Whitney's inventions or life, it was once the site of a cotton gin & he became their namesake.

Eli Whitney High, built in the nineteen-twenties, serviced the community until 1974. The following year, it was razed to the ground. The school's former gymnasium is now the Eli Whitney Community Center.
