= Fonville, North Carolina =

Unincorporated community in North Carolina, US

Coordinates: 35°17′25″N 78°46′11″W

Fonville is an unincorporated community located along U.S. Highway 401 in the Stewarts Creek Township of Harnett County, North Carolina between Bunnlevel and the Cumberland County town of Linden (Powell 1968, p. 176).
