= Mandale, North Carolina =

- Unincorporated community
- Location of Mandale in North Carolina Mandale, North Carolina (the United States)
- Coordinates: 35°51′12″N 79°16′23″W
- Country: United States
- State: North Carolina
- County: Alamance
- Elevation: 554 ft (169 m)
- Time zone: UTC-5 (Eastern (EST))
  - Summer (DST): UTC-4 (EDT)
- Area code: 336
- GNIS feature ID: 1006286

Mandale is an unincorporated community in Alamance County, North Carolina, United States.

Mandale is located on North Carolina Highway 87, south of Eli Whitney, and northwest of Pittsboro.
