= Worry, North Carolina =

Unincorporated community in North Carolina, US

Coordinates: 35°49′37″N 81°44′14″W

Worry is an unincorporated community in Burke County, in the U.S. state of North Carolina.

== History ==
Worry was so named by its citizens who were worried after postal authorities had rejected their first choices for a town name. A post office was established as Worry in 1888, and remained in operation until it was discontinued in 1944.
