= Tally Ho Township =

Town in North Carolina, USA

Coordinates: 36.246°N 78.730°W

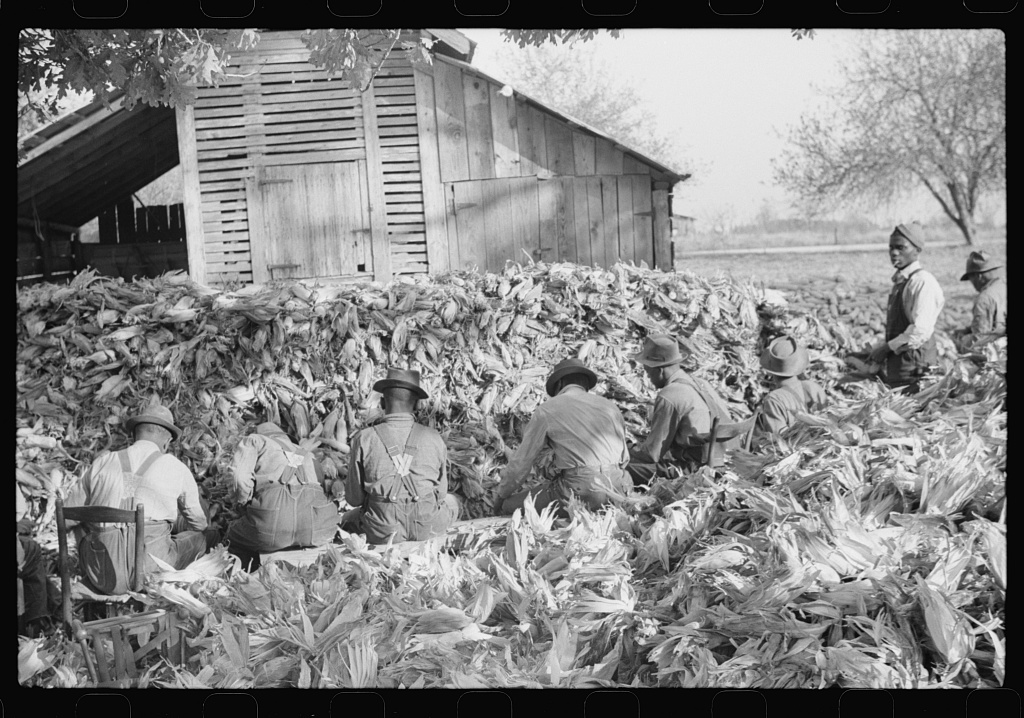
Corn shucking photo by Marion Post Wolcott

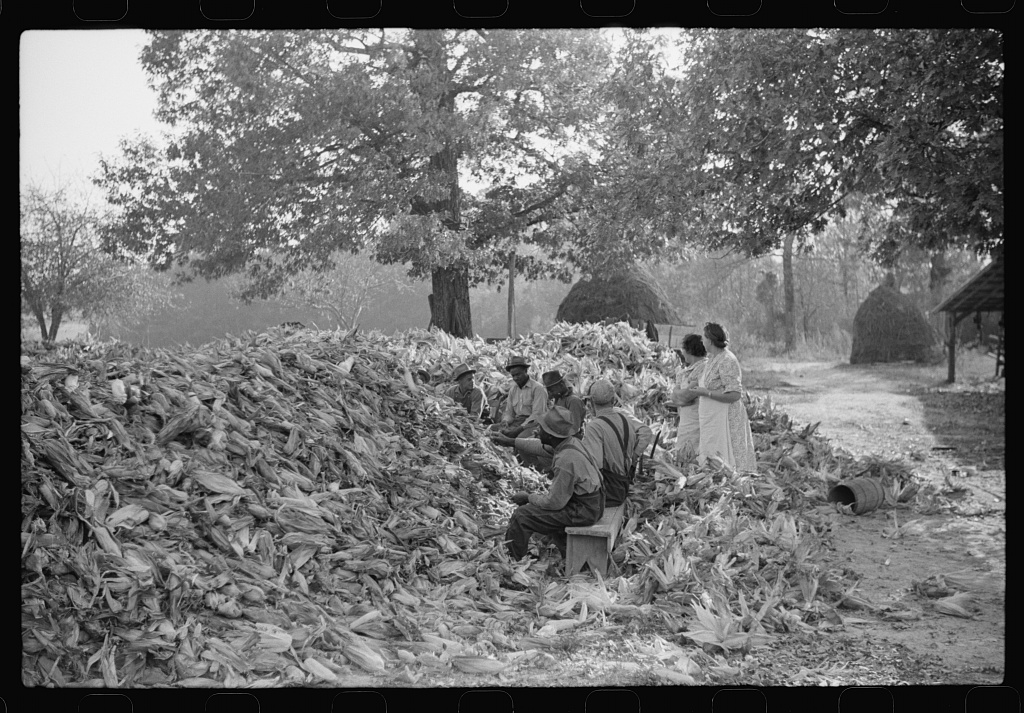

Tally Ho Township is in Granville County, North Carolina. It is near Stem, North Carolina. There is a Tall Ho Road and a Tally Ho Missionary Baptist Church and cemetery.

The area was used by fox hunters and named for their rallying cry. William Webb settled in the area in 1776. Forlorn Hope Lodge was located in Tally Ho. A post office was established in Tally Ho in 1830. It was relocated to Stem in 1889.

Governor William Woods Holden received a petition from residents who experienced Ku Klux Klan violence. Marion Post Wolcott took photographs of people living in the area during the Great Depression including African American tenant farmers eating after their white neighbors had finished.

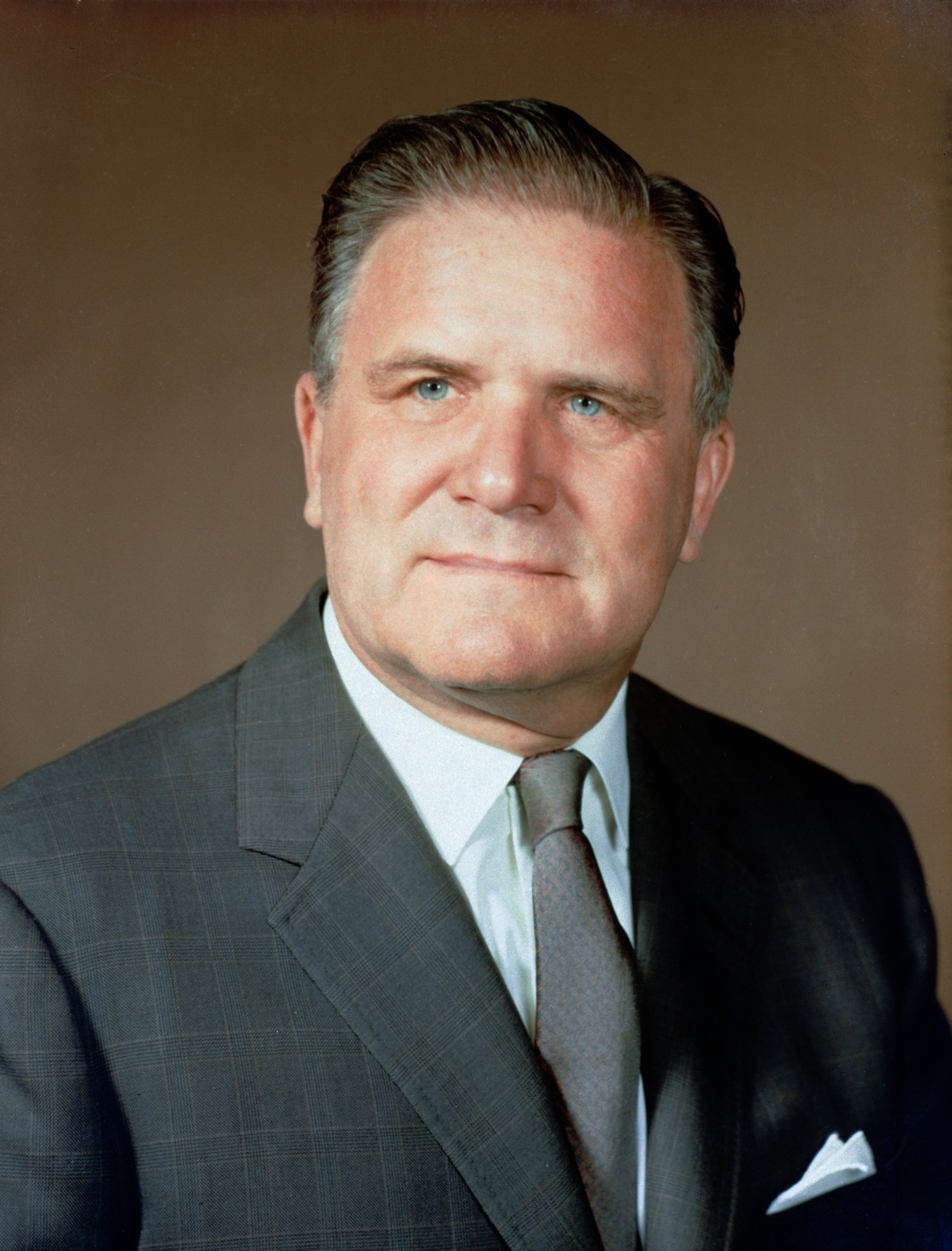
NASA administrator James E. Webb for whom the James Webb Space Telescope is named

State representative T. G. Tilley's post office was in Tally Ho. James Edwin Webb grew up in Tally Ho. His father, John Frederick Webb Sr., was superintendent of the Granville County's segregated public schools.

Enon Baptist Church was in Tally Ho.

Luna Lee Ellis taught in Tally Ho's White School District #2. Lizzie Cash Williford also taught white students in the area.
