= Unaka, North Carolina =

- Unincorporated community
- Location within North Carolina Location within the United States
- Coordinates: 35°11′43″N 84°08′30″W
- Country: United States
- State: North Carolina
- County: Cherokee
- Elevation: 1,644 ft (501 m)
- Time zone: UTC-5 (Eastern (EST))
  - Summer (DST): UTC-4 (EDT)
- Area code: 828
- GNIS feature ID: 1023032

Unaka is an unincorporated community in Cherokee County, North Carolina, United States. Unaka is located in the Nantahala National Forest, 9.6 miles (15.4 km) northwest of Murphy. Unaka is a name derived from a Cherokee word meaning "white", which referred to the appearance of low-lying clouds and fog over the Unicoi Mountains.

== History ==
Unaka had a post office until it closed on February 15, 1986. Unaka's volunteer fire department was established in 1983 and opened a new four-bay station in 2024. By 1940, the Unaka schoolhouse was a two-story, 6,600-square-feet, wood-frame building. In 1952, a new brick, five-classroom school was completed. Within five years, enrollment of its eight grades reached 153.

The Unaka Community Center was built in 1976. The community struggles with a lack of network connectivity as cellular service providers have said the area doesn't have a high enough population to make building a tower worthwhile. The community was promised fiber-optic internet in 2023 but lines have not been installed as of 2025. Unaka also struggles with limited trash disposal options as the county landfill takes around an hour to drive to.

In 2026, Cheyenne the miniature horse became Unaka's official mascot.
