= Chestnut Hills, Wake County, North Carolina =

Unincorporated community in North Carolina, US

Coordinates: 35°51′04″N 78°39′08″W

Chestnut Hills was an unincorporated community in Wake County, North Carolina, United States, which is now within the city limits of Raleigh. It lies at an elevation of 348 feet (106 m). It was begun in the early 1950s and was one of North Raleigh's original suburbs, preceding North Hills and North Hills Estates, although the total area is now referred to as North Hills, part of Midtown. This area is now undergoing changes, as some of the original ranch and split-level homes are being torn down and replaced by homes with a minimum of 2,800 square feet (260 m^{2}).
