= Lakeview, Davidson County, North Carolina =

Lakeview, North Carolina
- Unincorporated community
- Location within North Carolina Location within the United States
- Coordinates: 35°44′22″N 80°22′11″W
- Country: United States
- State: North Carolina
- County: Davidson
- Elevation: 764 ft (233 m)
- Time zone: UTC-5 (Eastern (EST))
  - Summer (DST): UTC-4 (EDT)
- Area code: 336
- GNIS feature ID: 988096

Lakeview is an unincorporated community in Davidson County, North Carolina, United States. The community is located along Interstate 85 at the North Carolina Highway 150 exit, 8.8 miles (14.2 km) southwest of Lexington.
