= Green Mountain, North Carolina =

Green Mountain
- Unincorporated community
- Location within the state of North Carolina
- Coordinates: 35°59′37″N 82°15′32″W
- Country: United States
- State: North Carolina
- County: Yancey

Area
  - Total: 11.4 sq mi (30 km^{2})
  - Land: 11.2 sq mi (29 km^{2})
  - Water: 0.2 sq mi (0.52 km^{2})
- Elevation: 2,159 ft (658 m)

Population (2000)
  - Total: 637
  - Density: 56.9/sq mi (22.0/km^{2})
- Time zone: UTC-5 (Eastern (EST))
  - Summer (DST): UTC-4 (EDT)
- ZIP codes: 28740
- GNIS feature ID: 1020542

Green Mountain is an unincorporated community in Yancey County, North Carolina, United States. Green Mountain sits along the Toe River, approximately seven miles north of Burnsville, the county seat. It shares a name with the ridgeline north of Burnsville that includes Phillips Knob and Rocky Knob. Its elevation is 2,159 feet (658 m). It has a post office with the ZIP code 28740, which is one of only two ZIP codes used for street addresses in the county, and also covers part of the Brush Creek, Jacks Creek, and Ramseytown townships of Yancey County and the Poplar township across the river in Mitchell County.

The greater Green Mountain township includes the settlements of Bee Branch, Green Mountain, and Toledo.
