= U.S. Route 1A (Wake Forest–Youngsville, North Carolina) =

U.S. Highway in North Carolina

U.S. Highway 1A
- US 1A highlighted in red

Route information
- Auxiliary route of US 1
- Maintained by NCDOT
- Length: 9.0 mi (14.5 km)
- Existed: 1953–present

Major junctions
- South end: US 1 in Wake Forest
- NC 98 in Wake Forest; NC 96 in Youngsville
- North end: US 1 near Youngsville

Location
- Country: United States
- State: North Carolina
- Counties: Wake, Franklin

Highway system
- United States Numbered Highway System; List; Special; Divided; North Carolina Highway System; Interstate; US; State; Scenic

U.S. Highway 1A (US 1A, also stylized as US 1-A) is a 9.0-mile-long (14.5 km) alternate route of US 1 through the towns of Wake Forest and Youngsville in North Carolina. The southern terminus of US 1A is located at US 1 and Falls of Neuse Road in southern Wake Forest. The highway travels north along South Main Street, intersecting North Carolina Highway 98 (NC 98) at the Dr. Calvin Jones Highway. In downtown Wake Forest, US 1A travels along the eastern side of Southeastern Baptist Theological Seminary concurrent with NC 98 Business (NC 98 Bus.). US 1A uses North Main Street to leave Wake Forest toward Youngsville. At the Wake County–Franklin county line the road name changes to Youngsville Boulevard. US 1A enters Youngsville from the southwest and runs concurrently with NC 96 for 0.6 miles (0.97 km) along College Street and Park Avenue before diverging to the north. The northern terminus of US 1A is located at US 1 north of Youngsville.

US 1A follows the former alignment of US 1 through the towns of Wake Forest and Youngsville. In 1953, US 1 was rerouted to bypass both towns to the west, with the remaining route signed as US 1A. Since its establishment, the routing of US 1A has remained unchanged.

== Route description ==
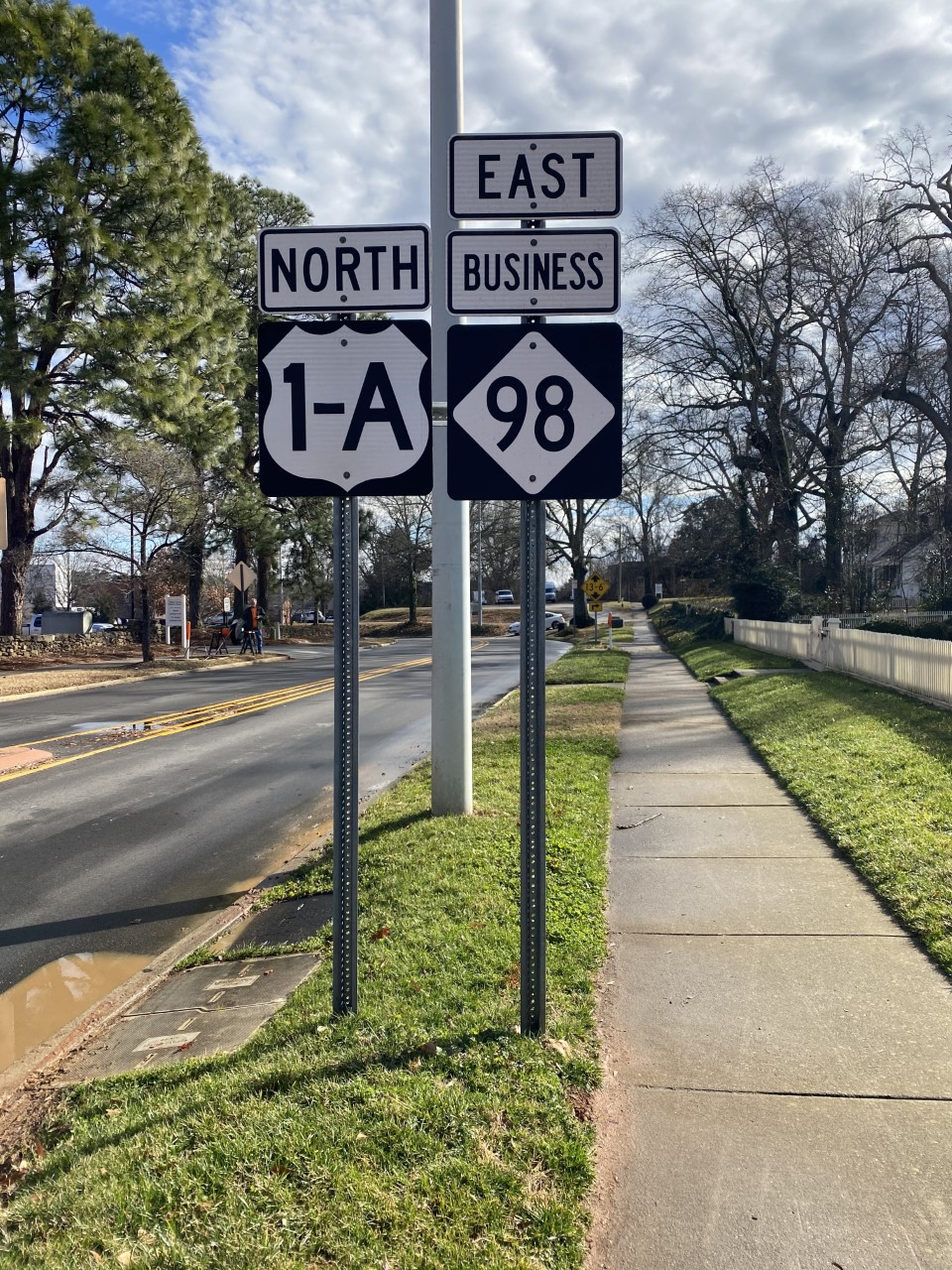
A reassurance marker along US 1A and NC 98 Bus. in Wake Forest using the "1-A" styling

The southern terminus of US 1A is located at an at-grade intersection with US 1 and Falls of Neuse Road south of Wake Forest. From its southern terminus, the highway runs northeast along South Main Street. After intersecting Ligon Mill Road, US 1A adjusts slightly to the north, giving the highway a more northerly orientation. At Rogers Road, the highway narrows to a three-lane road with two through lanes and a turning lane. Traveling north, US 1A passes through more of Wake Forest and the community of Forestville. At Forestville, the highway approaches CSX Transportation's S-Line from the southwest and parallels it for much of its remaining route. US 1A meets NC 98 at an at-grade intersection with the Dr. Calvin Jones Highway, named after the physician. From the intersection, US 1A travels north along South Main Street, west of the downtown district of Wake Forest. US 1A meets NC 98 Bus. at a roundabout south of the Southeastern Baptist Theological Seminary campus. The highways run concurrently along South Avenue and Front Street until reaching Roosevelt Avenue. NC 98 Bus. turns to follow Roosevelt Avenue to the east, while US 1A continues north along Front Street. On the north side of the seminary campus, US 1A intersects and turns to follow North Main Street, a divided highway. The highway passes to the west of Glen Royall Mill Village Historic District before exiting Wake Forest to the north.

At the Wake County–Franklin county line, the road name changes from North Main Street to Youngsville Boulevard. The highway makes a turn to the north before turning once again to the northeast. US 1A enters into the town of Youngsville from the southwest, intersecting NC 96 (Main Street) west of downtown. NC 96 and US 1A run concurrently along College Street to the north. At Park Avenue, US 1A and NC 96 diverge to the northwest running along the town limits of Youngsville. The 0.6-mile-long (0.97 km) concurrency ends northwest of Youngsville as US 1A and NC 96 split. US 1A runs in a northern orientation until reaching its northern terminus at US 1.

The North Carolina Department of Transportation (NCDOT) measures average daily traffic volumes along many of the roadways it maintains. In 2015, average daily traffic volumes along US 1A varied between 2,100 vehicles per day north of the Wake–Franklin county line and 28,000 vehicles per day north of the US 1 and Falls of Neuse Road intersection in southern Wake Forest.

== History ==
The general routing of modern US 1A appeared in a 1916 proposal for North Carolina's state highway system plan. At the time, the highway was detailed as part of an improved roadway which stretched from Raleigh to east of Warrenton. Upon the creation of the North Carolina Highway System in 1921, the highway running through Wake Forest and Youngsville was unnumbered. By 1924, this stretch of road was assigned as part of NC 50. NC 50 ran from the South Carolina state line near Rockingham to the Virginia state line near Wise. The road through Wake Forest and Youngsville was paved in the 1920s. By 1929, US 1 was assigned to overlay with NC 50, establishing the highway through both Wake Forest and Youngsville. By 1930, NC 91 was routed concurrent with US 1 for 0.17 miles (0.27 km) in Wake Forest. The concurrency followed the modern-day US 1A and NC 98 Bus. concurrency along the southeastern side of then-Wake Forest College. By 1941, NC 91 was replaced by NC 264 which ran concurrent along the same section of US 1.

By 1953, US 1 was routed along a bypass to the west of Wake Forest and Youngsville, with the former alignment being established as US 1A. NC 98 was extended west, replacing NC 264, to Durham. This created a concurrency between NC 98 and US 1A in downtown Wake Forest. Since its establishment, US 1A has remained along its modern-day routing. On August 21, 2006, NC 98 was routed onto a bypass south of downtown Wake Forest, removing the US 1A and NC 98 concurrency. The former alignment of NC 98 became NC 98 Bus., establishing a 0.17-mile (0.27 km) concurrency with US 1A along South Avenue.

== Major intersections ==
County	Location	mi	km	Destinations	Notes
Wake	Wake Forest	0.0	0.0	US 1 (Capital Boulevard) / Falls of Neuse Road – Raleigh	Southern terminus
Wake	Wake Forest	1.9	3.1	NC 98 (Dr. Calvin Jones Highway) – Durham, Bunn	
Wake	Wake Forest	2.9	4.7	NC 98 Bus. west (South Avenue)	Roundabout; West end of the NC 98 Business overlap
Wake	Wake Forest	3.0	4.8	NC 98 Bus. east (Roosevelt Avenue)	East end of the NC 98 Business overlap
Franklin	Youngsville	6.8	10.9	NC 96 south (Main Street) / Holden Road	South end of the NC 96 overlap
Franklin	Youngsville	7.4	11.9	NC 96 north – Oxford	North end of the NC 96 overlap
Franklin	Youngsville	9.0	14.5	US 1 – Franklinton, Henderson	Northern terminus
1.000 mi = 1.609 km; 1.000 km = 0.621 mi
