= U.S. Route 401 =

Highway in the United States

U.S. Route 401
- US 401 highlighted in red

Route information
- Auxiliary route of US 1
- Length: 251.0 mi (403.9 km)
- Existed: 1957–present

Major junctions
- South end: US 76 Bus. / US 521 in Sumter, SC
- I-20 near Lamar, SC; US 52 in Darlington, SC; I-74 / US 15 / US 74 / US 501 in Laurinburg, NC; NC 211 in Raeford, NC; I-295 in Fayetteville, NC; NC 540 Toll near Garner, NC; US 70 / NC 50 in Garner, NC; I-40 / US 64 in Raleigh, NC
- North end: I-85 / US 1 near Wise, NC

Location
- Country: United States
- States: South Carolina, North Carolina
- Counties: SC: Sumter, Lee, Darlington, Marlboro; NC: Scotland, Hoke, Cumberland, Harnett, Wake, Franklin, Warren

Highway system
- United States Numbered Highway System; List; Special; Divided
← SC 400	SC	→ SC 402
← NC 400	NC	→ NC 403

U.S. Route 401 (US 401) is a north–south United States highway, a spur of U.S. Route 1, that travels along the Fall Line from Sumter, South Carolina to Interstate 85 near Wise, North Carolina.

== Route description ==
Starting in Sumter, South Carolina, US 401 goes northeast through mostly swamp and farmland, as it connects the cities of Darlington and Bennettsville before crossing the state line into North Carolina. Traversing the state for 77.2 miles (124.2 km), it is mostly a two-lane rural road, which is likely to only have local traffic along it due to nearby Interstate 95.

In North Carolina, the highway becomes more utilized, as it connects several mid-size and large cities in the state. In the Sandhills region, it connects the cities of Laurinburg, Raeford, and Fayetteville, all three of which have business routes connecting the downtown areas. The road is typically two-lane still, but expands to four-lane (or more) in each city. The road then runs somewhat parallel to nearby Interstate 95 from Fayetteville through Lillington to Fuquay-Varina.

In Wake County, US 401 is center-stage again as a major north–south corridor, connecting bedroom communities to downtown Raleigh. Once it leaves the county, it reverts to a rural road connecting the small cities of Louisburg and Warrenton. US 401 finally ends at Interstate 85, just north of the community of Wise; completing a 173.8-mile (279.7 km) journey through the state.

== History ==
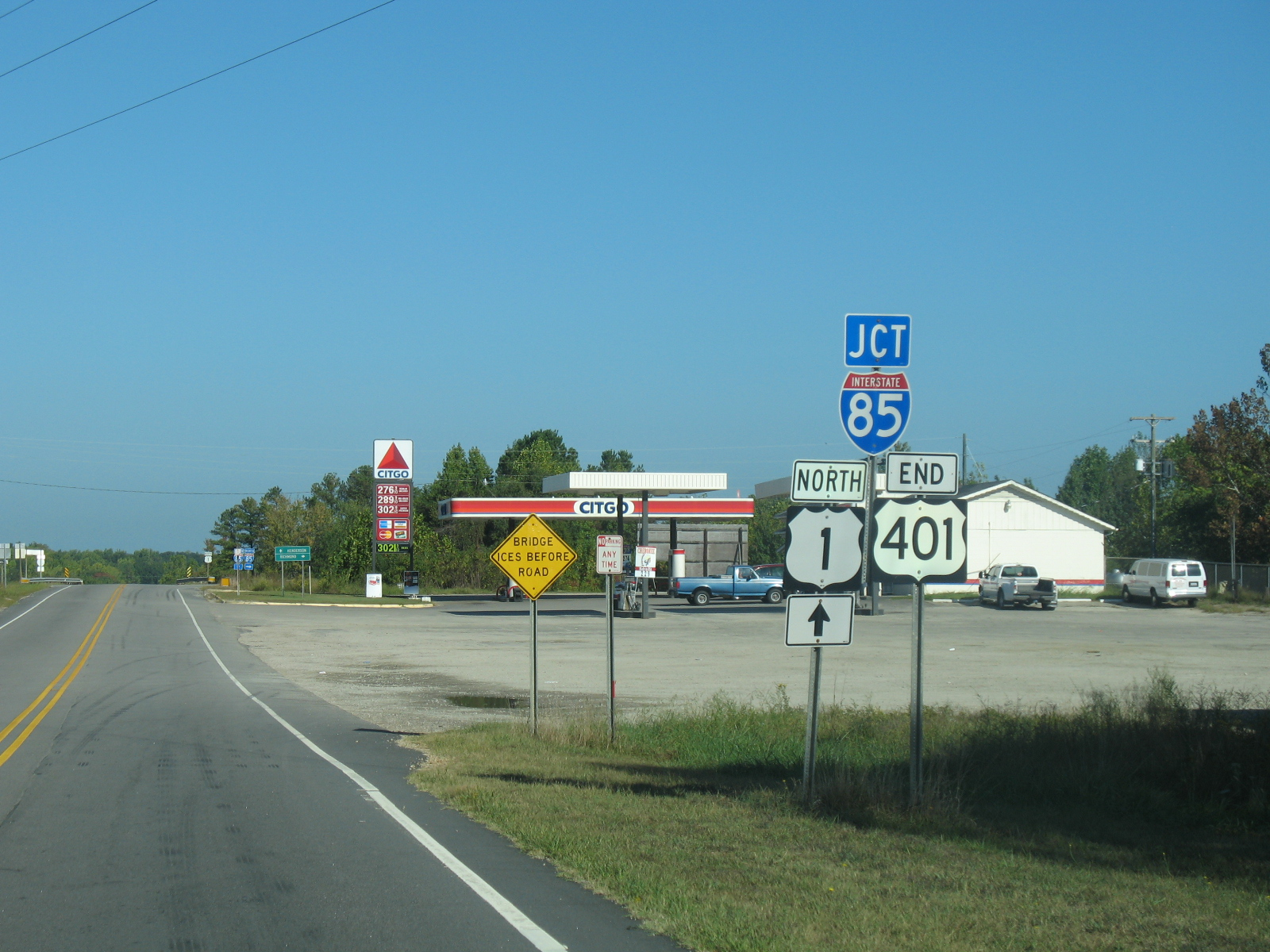
The north end of US 401 at I-85

US 401 was established in 1957 as a renumbering of US 15A, from Sumter to Raleigh, and NC 59, from Raleigh to Norlina; it is the third and current route to bear the name.

In 1967, northbound US 401 was rerouted along South Street west onto McDowell Street, formally using Lenoir Street, in Raleigh. That same year, US 401 was rerouted onto a bypass route northwest of downtown Fayetteville, replacing part of NC 59; its old alignment became US 401 Business. In 1971, US 52/US 401 was placed on a new bypass northwest of Darlington; its old alignment became US 52 Business. In 1984, US 401 was rerouted along the eastern half of the Raleigh Beltline (Tom Bradshaw Freeway and Cliff Benson Beltline); its former alignment through downtown Raleigh was downgraded to secondary roads. In 1991, US 401 was rerouted back through downtown Raleigh after I-440 was established along the entire Raleigh Beltline. In 2001, US 401 was extended north, in concurrency with US 1, to its current northern terminus to I-85, north of Norlina. On July 16, 2015, US 401 was placed onto new four-lane superstreet alignment bypassing east of Rolesville; its former alignment through downtown Rolesville became US 401 Business.

The first US 401 existed between 1926 and 1931, solely in Virginia, it was replaced by US 52. The second US 401 existed between 1932 and 1934, in North Carolina and South Carolina, it was replaced by US 15 and US 15A.

== Junction list ==
State	County	Location	mi	km	Destinations	Notes
South Carolina	Sumter	Sumter	0.0	0.0	US 521 (Washington Street) / US 76 Bus.	
South Carolina	Sumter	Sumter	0.5	0.80	US 15 (Lafayette Drive) – Summerton, Bishopville	
South Carolina	Sumter	Sumter	1.9	3.1	US 76 / US 378 (Robert E. Graham Freeway) – Conway, Columbia	
South Carolina	Lee	St. Charles	12.6	20.3	SC 154 (St. Charles Highway) – Mayesville, Bishopville	
South Carolina	Lee	Elliott	17.1	27.5	SC 527 (Elliott Highway) – Kingstree, Bishopville	
South Carolina	Lee		18.6	29.9	SC 341 (Lynchburg Highway) – Lynchburg, Bishopville	
South Carolina	Darlington	Lamar	24.5	39.4	Main Street / Lee State Park Road – Lee State Park	
South Carolina	Darlington		27.4	44.1	SC 403 (Oates Highway) – Timmonsville, Hartsville	
South Carolina	Darlington		28.0	45.1	I-20 – Florence, Columbia	
South Carolina	Darlington	Darlington	37.8	60.8	US 52 south (Governor Williams Highway) – Florence	South end of US 52 overlap
South Carolina	Darlington	Darlington	38.2	61.5	SC 34 / SC 151 (Harry Byrd Highway) – Hartsville, Darlington, Charlotte	Interchange
South Carolina	Darlington		41.1	66.1	US 52 Bus. south (Main Street) – Darlington	
South Carolina	Darlington		52.3	84.2	US 15 south (Hartsville Highway) – Hartsville	South end of US 15 overlap
South Carolina	Darlington	Society Hill	54.3	87.4	US 52 north (Cheraw Highway) – Cheraw	North end of US 52 overlap
South Carolina	Marlboro		61.3	98.7	SC 912 (Willamette Road)	
South Carolina	Marlboro	Bennettsville	64.6	104.0	SC 385 north (Main Street) – Bennettsville	
South Carolina	Marlboro	Bennettsville	65.6	105.6	SC 9 north / SC 38 north (Cottingham Boulevard) – Cheraw	North end of SC 9/38 overlap
South Carolina	Marlboro	Bennettsville	66.5	107.0	SC 38 south / SC 9 Bus. north / SC 38 Bus. north (Broad Street) – Marion, Myrtle Beach	South end of SC 38 overlap
South Carolina	Marlboro	Bennettsville	67.6	108.8	SC 9 south (Tyson Avenue) – North Myrtle Beach, Dillon	South end of SC 9 overlap
South Carolina	Marlboro				I-73	Proposed interchange
South Carolina	Marlboro	McColl	75.6	121.7	SC 381 (Main Street) – Clio, Blenheim, Hamlet	
			77.2 0.0	124.2 0.0	South Carolina–North Carolina state line	
North Carolina	Scotland	Laurinburg	5.2	8.4	US 15 Bus. north / US 401 Bus. north (Main Street)	
North Carolina	Scotland	Laurinburg	5.8	9.3	I-74 / US 74 / US 501 south – Rockingham, Lumberton, Wilmington	South end of US 501 overlap
North Carolina	Scotland	Laurinburg	7.0	11.3	US 74 Bus. (Church Street)	
North Carolina	Scotland	Laurinburg	8.8	14.2	US 15 Bus. south / US 501 Bus. south (Aberdeen Road) US 15 north / US 501 north (Aberdeen Road) – Aberdeen, Sanford	North end of US 15/US 501 overlap
North Carolina	Scotland	Laurinburg	9.8	15.8	US 401 Bus. south (Wagram Road)	
North Carolina	Scotland	Wagram	16.8	27.0	NC 144 west (Old Wire Road)	To John Charles McNeill House
North Carolina	Hoke	Raeford	26.9	43.3	US 401 Bus. north (Harris Avenue)	
North Carolina	Hoke	Raeford	27.2	43.8	To NC 211 (Teal Drive)	
North Carolina	Hoke		31.4	50.5	US 401 Bus. south – Raeford	
North Carolina	Cumberland	Fayetteville	39.2	63.1	I-295 (Fayetteville Outer Loop) – Fort Bragg, Fayetteville	
North Carolina	Cumberland	Fayetteville	43.8	70.5	US 401 Bus. north (Raeford Road)	
North Carolina	Cumberland	Fayetteville	46.3	74.5	All American Expressway – Fort Bragg, Pope Army Airfield	
North Carolina	Cumberland	Fayetteville	47.1	75.8	NC 24 / NC 87 (Bragg Boulevard)	
North Carolina	Cumberland	Fayetteville	49.4	79.5	NC 210	
North Carolina	Cumberland	Fayetteville	51.7	83.2	US 401 Bus. south (Ramsey Street)	
North Carolina	Cumberland	Fayetteville	55.2	88.8	I-295 (Fayetteville Outer Loop) to I-95 / US 13 – Fort Bragg, Lillington	
North Carolina	Cumberland		64.3	103.5	NC 217 north (Linden Road) – Linden	
North Carolina	Harnett	Lillington	74.9	120.5	NC 210 south – Spring Lake, Fort Bragg	South end of NC 210 overlap
North Carolina	Harnett	Lillington	75.0	120.7	NC 27 west (Old Road) – Cameron, Carthage	West end of NC 27 overlap
North Carolina	Harnett	Lillington	75.4	121.3	US 421 north (Front Street) – Sanford	North end of US 421 overlap; to Raven Rock State Park
North Carolina	Harnett	Lillington	77.0	123.9	US 421 south / NC 27 east / NC 210 north – Erwin, Dunn, Angier	South end of US 421, east end of NC 27, and north end of NC 210 overlap
North Carolina	Wake	Fuquay Varina	89.7	144.4	NC 42 west (Academy Street) – Sanford	West end of NC 42 overlap
North Carolina	Wake	Fuquay Varina	90.5	145.6	NC 55 west (Ennis Street) – Holly Springs	West end of NC 55 overlap
North Carolina	Wake	Fuquay Varina	92.5	148.9	NC 42 east / NC 55 east – Angier, Clayton	East end of NC 42/NC 55 overlap
North Carolina	Wake		97.7	157.2	NC 540 Toll	
North Carolina	Wake	Garner	103.8	167.0	US 70 east / NC 50 south – Garner, Smithfield, Goldsboro	East end of US 70 and south end of NC 50 overlap
North Carolina	Wake	Raleigh	104.8	168.7	Wilmington Street – Downtown Raleigh	
North Carolina	Wake	Raleigh	105.5	169.8	I-40 / US 64 – Cary, Durham, Benson	
North Carolina	Wake	Raleigh	106.7	171.7	Martin Luther King Jr Boulevard / Western Boulevard	
North Carolina	Wake	Raleigh	108.2	174.1	Peace Street	
North Carolina	Wake	Raleigh	108.7	174.9	US 70 west / NC 50 north (Wade Avenue) – RDU Airport, Research Triangle Park	West end of US 70 and north end of NC 50 overlap
North Carolina	Wake	Raleigh	108.8	175.1	Fairview Road	Northbound left exit, no northbound entrance
North Carolina	Wake	Raleigh	109.5	176.2	North Wake Forest Road	No southbound exit
North Carolina	Wake	Raleigh	109.7	176.5	South Wake Forest Road / Atlantic Avenue	
North Carolina	Wake	Raleigh	111.2	179.0	I-440 / US 1 south – Sanford, Rocky Mount	South end of US 1 overlap
North Carolina	Wake	Raleigh	113.5	182.7	US 1 north (Capital Boulevard) – Wake Forest, Henderson	North end of US 1 overlap
North Carolina	Wake	Raleigh	115.9	186.5	I-540 – Rocky Mount, Wilson, Durham	SPUI
North Carolina	Wake		125.5	202.0	NC 96 (Zebulon Road) – Zebulon, Youngsville	
North Carolina	Franklin		127.4	205.0	NC 98 – Bunn, Wake Forest	
North Carolina	Franklin	Louisburg	136.9	220.3	NC 56 west – Franklinton	West end of NC 56 overlap
North Carolina	Franklin	Louisburg	137.6	221.4	NC 39 south – Bunn	South end of NC 39 overlap
North Carolina	Franklin	Louisburg	138.5	222.9	NC 56 east / NC 581 south (Nash Street) – Rocky Mount	East end of NC 56 overlap
North Carolina	Franklin	Louisburg	139.1	223.9	NC 561 east – Centerville	
North Carolina	Franklin	Ingleside	144.0	231.7	NC 39 north – Henderson	North end of NC 39 overlap
North Carolina	Warren	Warrenton	162.3	261.2	US 158 Bus. east / NC 58 south (Macon Street) – Macon, Centerville	East end of US 158 Business overlap
North Carolina	Warren	Norlina	165.5	266.3	US 158 east – Macon, Roanoke Rapids	East end of US 158 and west end of US 158 Business overlap
North Carolina	Warren	Norlina	166.7	268.3	US 1 south / US 158 west – Middleburg, Henderson	South end of US 1 and west end of US 158 overlap
North Carolina	Warren		173.8	279.7	I-85 / US 1 north – Henderson, Richmond	Continuation as US 1
1.000 mi = 1.609 km; 1.000 km = 0.621 mi: Concurrency terminus; Incomplete access; Unopened
