= Capital Boulevard =

Road in North Carolina, United States

- Length: 18.5 mi (29.8 km)
- North end: US 401 / US 70 / NC 50 near Raleigh
- Major junctions: I-440 / US 1 in Raleigh; I-540 in Raleigh
- South end: US 1 near Wake Forest

Capital Boulevard is a major thoroughfare in Wake County, North Carolina. At various points along the route, it carries NC 50, U.S. Highway 70 (US 70), U.S. Route 401, and US 1. It links Downtown Raleigh with its northeastern suburbs. It is one of the busiest corridors in Raleigh, with 63 thousand average daily vehicles near its intersection with Interstate 440 (I-440).

== Route description ==

Its southern terminus is at the northern edge of Downtown Raleigh, North Carolina, south of which the roadways continue as a pair of matched one-way streets, Dawson Street (southbound) and McDowell Street (northbound). At this point the road carries US 401, US 70 and NC 50. It begins as an urban expressway, with limited driveways and grade-separated interchanges through an industrial area north of Downtown, carrying two through lanes in each direction. Major interchanges in this area include, from south to north, Peace Street, Wade Avenue (where US 70 West and NC 50 North leave Capital Boulevard), Fairview Road, Wake Forest Road, Atlantic Avenue, and Yonkers Road.

Ground level view of interchange with Interstate 540

At an interchange with I-440, it widens to four through lanes in each direction while also transitioning to a divided boulevard-grade roadway with signalized at-grade intersections and frequent driveways. At the I-440 interchange, US 1 joins going northbound. The section between I-440 and I-540 is heavily commercial, saturated with shopping centers, anchored by Triangle Town Center, a large shopping mall near the interchange with I-540. There is one interchange about half-way between I-440 and I-540, where US 401 splits on to Louisburg Road, leaving only US 1 on Capital Boulevard. North of I-540, the route becomes an arterial divided highway, with two lanes in each direction and a mixture of signalized intersections and grade-separated interchanges as it bypasses to the east of the Wakefield Plantation development of North Raleigh and to the west of the town of Wake Forest. Major intersections and interchanges in this section include an intersection with Falls of Neuse Road/South Main Street (US 1A) just south of Wake Forest, and two numbered interchanges with NC 98 and NC 98 Business (Exits 124 and 125 respectively).

Northern terminus of Capital Boulevard

Capital Boulevard ends at the Wake County line just to the north of Purnell Road, with the US 1 designation continuing on into Youngsville, Franklin County.

== History ==
Capital Boulevard was originally named Downtown Boulevard as far north as its intersection with Wake Forest Road. North of Wake Forest Road, it was known as North Boulevard.

== Traffic and safety issues ==
Capital Boulevard (US 1 / US 401) is consistently documented as one of the most hazardous arterial corridors in North Carolina, recording elevated rates of motor vehicle collisions, severe injuries, and pedestrian fatalities. Rapid population growth across Wake County and heavy daily commuter volume between downtown Raleigh and northern suburbs have routinely overwhelmed the highway's corridor capacity.

=== Vehicular crashes ===
Data from the North Carolina Department of Transportation (NCDOT) and local law enforcement show that major interchanges and signalized intersections along Capital Boulevard account for a disproportionate share of Wake County traffic collisions. Primary crash factors and structural safety conflicts along the corridor include:

- Interchange Bottlenecks: The I-440 and I-540 interchanges with Capital Boulevard consistently rank among the highest collision points in the Raleigh metropolitan area due to sudden slowdowns and high-speed lane weaving.
- Intersection Collisions: High concentrations of commercial driveways and multi-lane intersections (such as Millbrook Road, Trawick Road, and Spring Forest Road) produce high numbers of rear-end crashes during peak hours, as well as angle collisions caused by red-light running.

=== Pedestrian hazards and Vision Zero ===
The arterial design poses severe risks for non-motorized travel, characterized by multi-lane crossings, high posted speeds, and historic gaps in sidewalk coverage. State crash audits consistently classify sections of the boulevard as high-risk pedestrian danger zones:

- Capital Boulevard and Calvary Drive: Identified in NCDOT and municipal safety studies as a top location statewide for pedestrian-involved collisions, recording seven pedestrian fatalities near this single intersection over a two-year period.
- Corridor Fatalities: Between 2022 and 2023 alone, ten pedestrian fatalities occurred along the Capital Boulevard corridor within Raleigh city limits.

To reduce traffic fatalities, the City of Raleigh integrated Capital Boulevard into its municipal Vision Zero safety initiative using state and federal grant funding. Safety upgrades implemented or scheduled along the highway include:

- Installation of flexible traffic-delineator posts at critical intersections (such as Calvary Drive) to narrow vehicular turning radii and shorten pedestrian crosswalk exposure times.
- Infrastructure enhancements including pedestrian median refuge islands, upgraded high-intensity street lighting, sidewalk construction, and modern Accessible Pedestrian Signals (APS).
- Signal retiming to incorporate Leading Pedestrian Intervals (LPI) and protected left-turn signals at high-incident intersections.

== Major intersections ==
The entire route is in Wake County.

Location	mi	km	Exit	Destinations	Notes
Raleigh	0	0.0		US 401 south / US 70 east (McDowell Street) / NC 50 south (Dawson Street)	Southern terminus of Capital Boulevard
Raleigh	0.2	0.32		West Peace Street - William Peace University	Southbound traffic uses Johnson and Harrington Streets
Raleigh	0.8	1.3		US 70 west / NC 50 north (Wade Avenue)	West end of US 70 overlap; north end of NC 50 overlap
Raleigh	0.9	1.4		Fairview Road	
Raleigh	1.5	2.4		Wake Forest Road (north)	Northbound exit and southbound entrance
Raleigh	1.6	2.6		Wake Forest Road (south) / Atlantic Avenue	
Raleigh	3.4	5.5		I-440 / US 1 south – Cary, Rocky Mount	South end of US 1 overlap; I-440 exit 11
Raleigh	5.7	9.2		US 401 north (Louisburg Road) – Rolesville, Louisburg	North end of US 401 overlap
Raleigh	8.3	13.4		I-540 to I-40 / I-87 – Durham, Knightdale	I-540 exit 16
Raleigh	9.8	15.8		Durant Road / Perry Creek Road	Future interchange.
Wake Forest	11.8	19.0		Burlington Mills Road	Future interchange.
Wake Forest	13.7	22.0		US 1A north (South Main Street/Falls of Neuse Road)	
Wake Forest	15.1	24.3	124	NC 98 – Wake Forest, Durham, Bunn	SPUI interchange
Wake Forest	16.0	25.7	125	NC 98 Bus. (Durham Road) – Wake Forest	Diamond interchange
Wake Forest	18.2	29.3		Purnell Road / Harris Road	Future interchange (funded), scheduled to begin construction in 2024.
	18.5	29.8		US 1 north	Northern terminus of Capital Boulevard, roadway continues as US 1
1.000 mi = 1.609 km; 1.000 km = 0.621 mi

== Landmarks ==
- William Peace University
- Triangle Town Center
- Falls Lake and Falls Lake State Recreation Area
