= Royal India =

Restaurant in Raleigh, North Carolina

Coordinates: 35.8337°N 78.5841°W

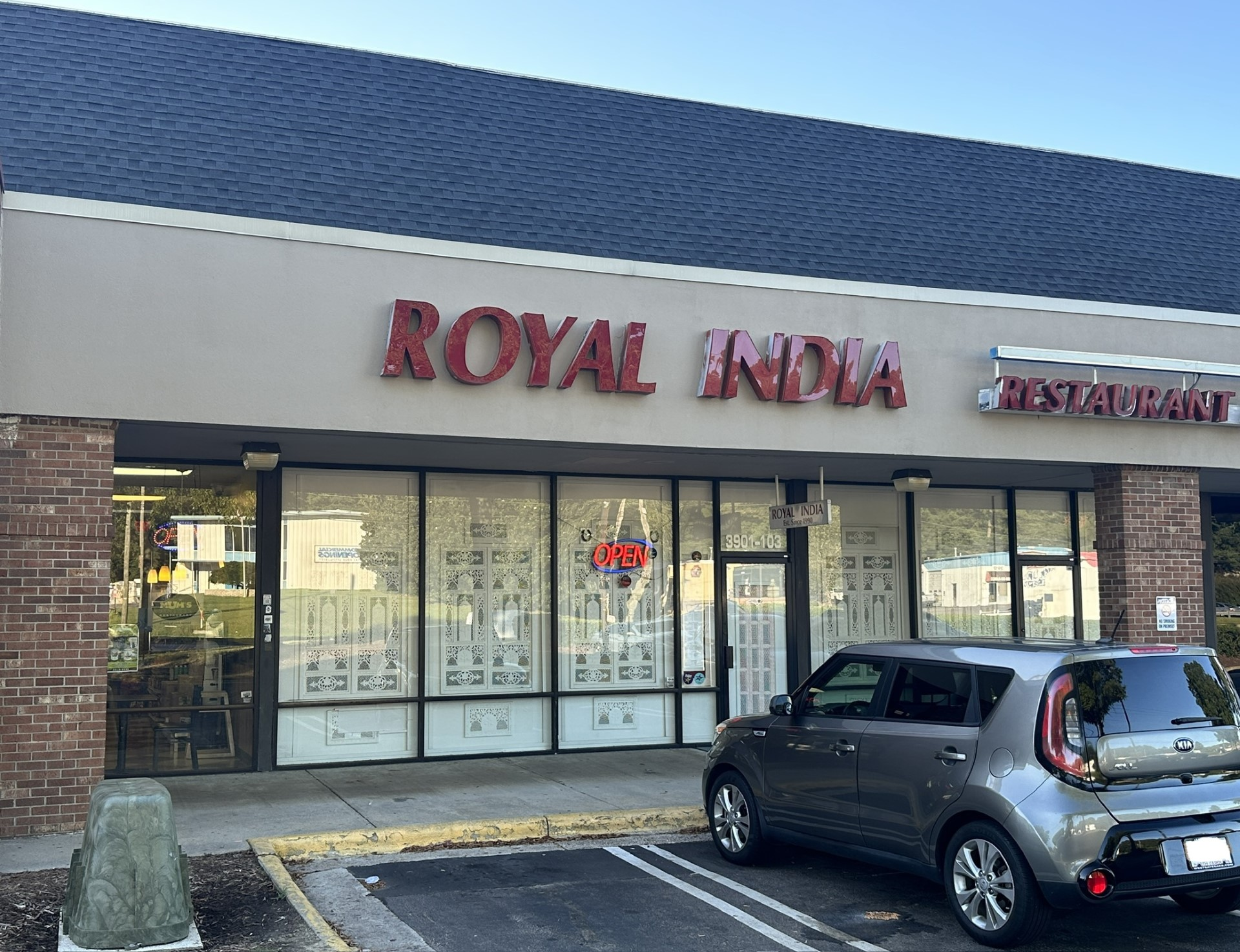
The storefront of Royal India in Raleigh, North Carolina

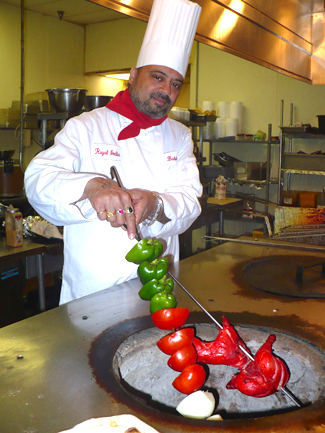
Royal India's chef - Balbir Singh "Baba"

Royal India is one of the oldest Indian restaurants in Raleigh, North Carolina. It was established in 1990 off Capital Boulevard, which is a section of U.S. Route 1 in North Carolina. Royal India has received reviews for the best Indian cuisine from media outlets based in the Triangle area of North Carolina. There is a dramatic increase in the population of South Asian Indians in the neighboring city of Morrisville, where Indian population jumped from 4 percent in 2000 to 20 percent in 2010. This allowed establishment of many new Indian restaurants in Western Raleigh, Cary and Morrisville. Over the years, Royal India has marketed in diverse communities. Royal India hosted an ethnic food event - Ethnosh in April 2015.
