= U.S. Route 1 in North Carolina =

Segment of American highway

U.S. Highway 1
- US 1 highlighted in red

Route information
- Maintained by NCDOT
- Length: 174.1 mi (280.2 km)
- Existed: 1926–present

Major junctions
- South end: US 1 at the South Carolina state line near Rockingham
- I-74 / US 74 in Rockingham; US 220 in Rockingham; US 15 / US 501 in Aberdeen; US 421 in Sanford; US 64 in Cary; I-40 / I-440 in Raleigh; US 70 in Raleigh; I-540 in Raleigh; US 401 in Raleigh; I-85 / US 158 in Henderson
- North end: US 1 at the Virginia state line near Wise

Location
- Country: United States
- State: North Carolina
- Counties: Richmond, Moore, Lee, Chatham, Wake, Franklin, Vance, Warren

Highway system
- United States Numbered Highway System; List; Special; Divided; North Carolina Highway System; Interstate; US; State; Scenic
| ← NC 906 | → NC 2 |

U.S. Highway 1 (US 1) is a north–south United States Numbered Highway which runs along the East Coast of the U.S. between Key West, Florida, and the Canada–United States border near Fort Kent, Maine. In North Carolina, US 1 runs for 174.1 miles (280.2 km) across the central region of the state. The highway enters North Carolina from South Carolina, southwest of Rockingham. US 1 runs northeast, passing through or closely bypassing Southern Pines and Sanford in the Sandhills region. It next passes through Cary, the state capital of Raleigh, and Wake Forest. The highway continues north to Henderson, before leaving the state at the Virginia state line, near Wise. The route is mostly a multilane divided arterial road, with several freeway segments. It serves as a strategic highway, connecting the North Carolina Sandhills and Research Triangle regions northward to the Southside region.

== Route description ==
=== South Carolina to Southern Pines ===
US 1 northbound in Rockingham

US 1 enters North Carolina from South Carolina as a two-lane road in a rural area of Richmond County about 10 miles (16 km) south of Rockingham. For the first few miles of its route, it travels through a mix of forests and agricultural areas. Later, it has an interchange with the I-74/US 74 at the edge of the community of East Rockingham; north of the interchange the road widens to a five-lane boulevard. Upon entering the city of Rockingham, it becomes a short expressway, where it meets the southern end of US 220. After the US 220 intersection, it returns to boulevard grade before narrowing to a two-lane city street known as Hancock Street into downtown Rockingham and then follows a series of paired one-way streets before continuing north along Fayetteville Road eastward out of Rockingham city limits. Once leaving Rockingham, the road continues as a two-lane road traveling east-northeast, with occasional wider sections with a center turning lane. Passing Rockingham Speedway, the road widens to a divided expressway (two lanes in each direction) and meets the northern end of North Carolina Highway 177 (NC 177). After passing through the town of Hoffman as a five-lane boulevard with a center turn lane, US 1 enters Moore County.

=== Southern Pines to Raleigh ===
US 1 northbound in Pinebluff

Near the Moore County line, US 1 becomes a four-lane divided expressway, with five-lane boulevard segments in Pinebluff, Aberdeen, and the southern part of Southern Pines. Within Aberdeen, the route forms a concurrency with US 15/US 501/NC 211. US 1 follows a partially controlled-access expressway though Southern Pines, bypassing the downtown area. After North May Street, it becomes a brief four-lane arterial before returning to a partially controlled-access expressway after Aiken Road. It bypasses the small towns of Vass and Cameron, where it crosses NC 690 and NC 27, respectively. Crossing into Lee County, it merges with US 15/US 501 a second time just south of the community of Tramway.

US 1 northbound in Aberdeen, concurrent with US 15, US 501, and NC 211

Through Tramway, the route transitions to a four-lane undivided boulevard and then becomes a freeway bypassing Sanford. The route will remain a freeway through to the north side of Raleigh. Outside of Sanford, US 1/US 15/US 501 briefly run concurrent with NC 87 and then intersect US 421, which provides access to Lillington and Wilmington southbound and Greensboro and Winston-Salem northbound. US 1 then splits from US 15/US 501 and NC 87, which go to the downtown area of Sanford with US 1 Business (US 1 Bus.) following US 1's original route with them. Passing by the Chatham County community of Moncure, it enters Wake County and passes near the Shearon Harris Nuclear Power Plant and Harris Lake. Passing between Apex to the north and Holly Springs to the south, the route has an interchange with NC 540 (Triangle Expressway) and merges with US 64 as it crosses into Cary. At the Raleigh–Cary line, near the Crossroads Plaza shopping center, it has an interchange with I-40 and begins an 11-mile (18 km) concurrency with I-440 along the Raleigh Beltline. Along the beltline, there are interchanges with NC 54, Wade Avenue, US 70/NC 50 (Glenwood Avenue), and several other local Raleigh thoroughfares.

=== Raleigh to Virginia ===
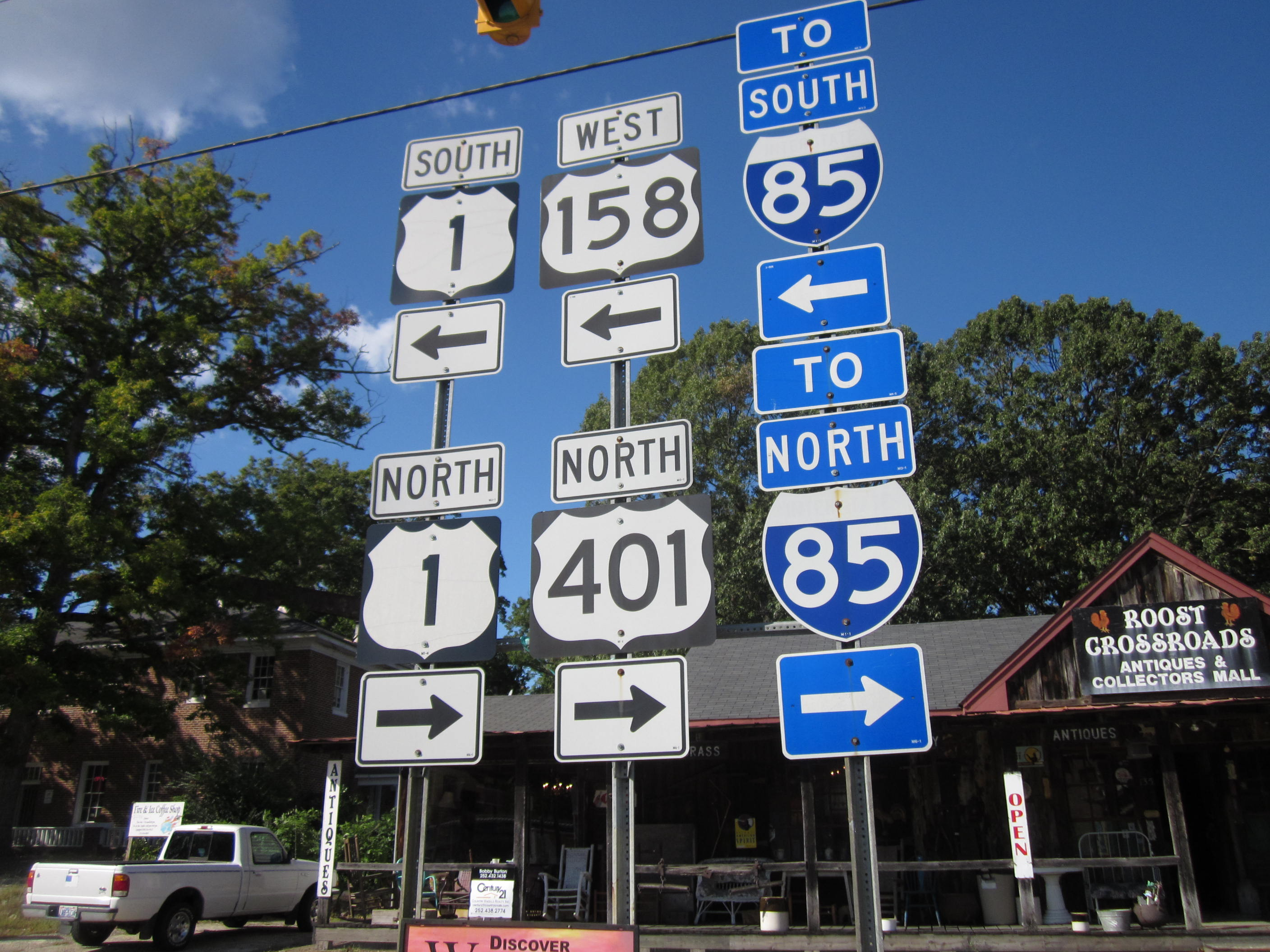
Norlina, where US 158 and US 401 exchange concurrencies with US 1.

North of Raleigh, US 1 leaves the I-440 beltline to join Capital Boulevard and US 401, a major commercial thoroughfare through northeast Raleigh. US 401 leaves US 1 to follow Louisburg Road, and US 1 continues past the Triangle Town Center shopping mall and I-540. The section from I-440 to I-540 is mostly six lanes wide with a median though with numerous business entrances and cross streets. Upon reaching Wake Forest, the road becomes an expressway with partial limited access, including interchanges with NC 98 and NC 98 Bus. It then passes Youngsville as it enters Franklin County. There is an intersection with NC 96 and then, in Franklinton, an interchange with NC 56. Upon entering Vance County, US 1 passes through the small town of Kittrell and becomes a freeway bypass around the city of Henderson, with US 1 Bus. following a prior routing through Henderson itself. After an interchange with NC 39 and several local roads, the freeway merges with I-85, though US 1 leaves the freeway immediately before this and joins US 158 as a two-lane rural road, paralleling I-85. There is a second interchange with I-85 near Middleburg, before US 1 enters Warren County, and, in the town of Norlina, US 158 leaves US 1, while US 401 joins it for a second time. US 1 turns from the northeast to a more northerly route, passes through the community of Wise, and has a third interchange with I-85 where US 401 has its northern terminus. Shortly thereafter, US 1 crosses into Virginia near the Lake Gaston community of Palmer Springs.

=== Alternate names ===
Though the highway is commonly known as "Highway 1" or "US 1" throughout the state, the highway does have other known names it uses locally in areas.

- Capital Boulevard – Road name from I-440 north to the Franklin County line.
- Claude E. Pope Memorial Highway – Official North Carolina name of US 1, from I-40 in Cary south to the Chatham County line.
- Cliff Benson Beltline – Road name of Raleigh northern inner-beltline, cosigned with I-440.
- H. Clifton Blue Memorial Boulevard – Official North Carolina name of US 1 through Southern Pines.
- Jefferson Davis Highway – Road name in Lee County, approved in 1959 by county resolution at the request of the United Daughters of the Confederacy (UDC).

== History ==
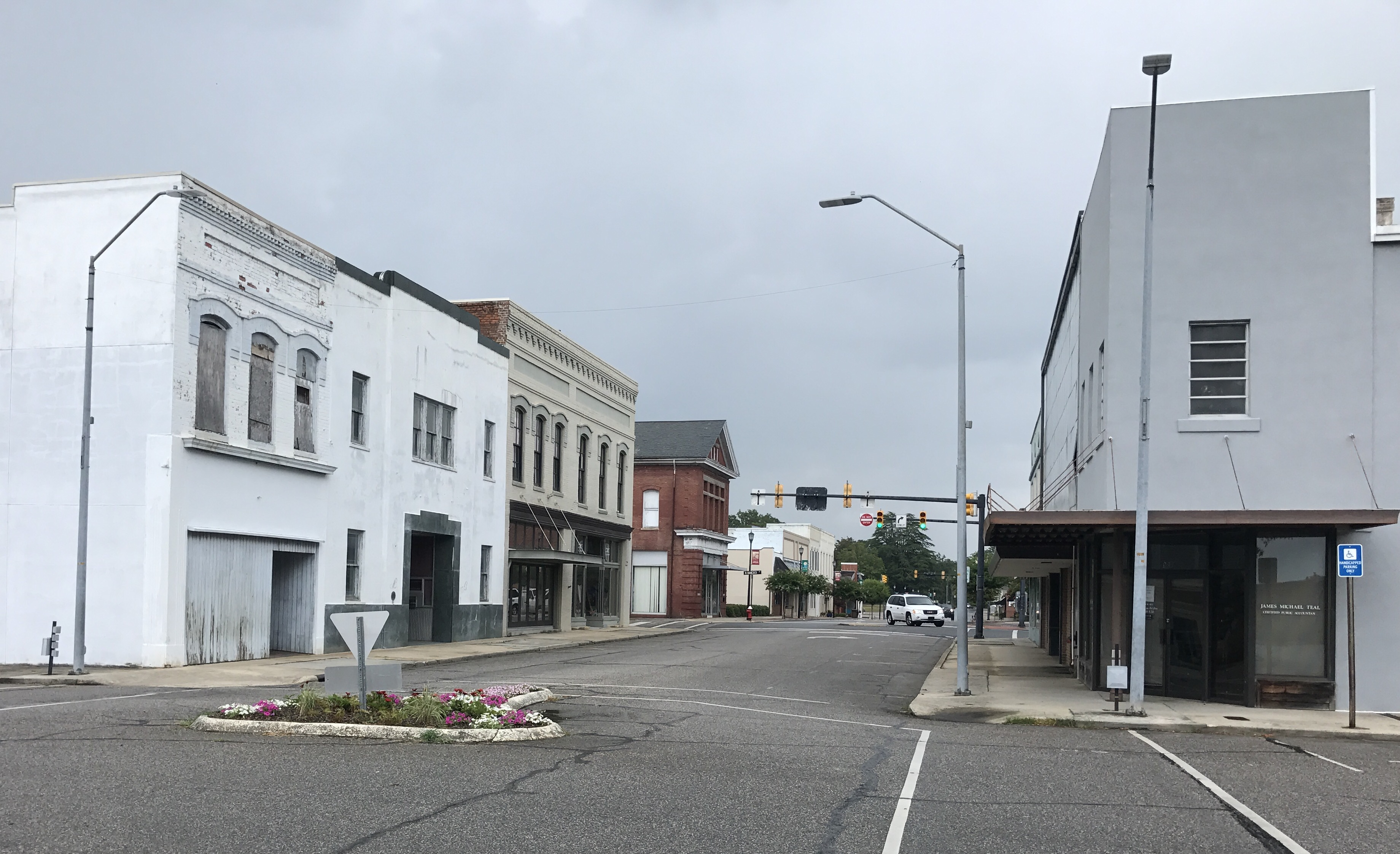
Northbound US 1 approaches the center of Rockingham along Washington Street.

The general route of US 1 in North Carolina was first part of the Capital Highway, an auto trail organized in 1909 to encourage counties along the route to improve the road between Washington, D.C. and Atlanta, Georgia. It differed from US 1 north of Norlina, where it ran via Emporia, Virginia, and Roanoke Rapids and between Southern Pines and Rockingham, where a route via Pinehurst—where the association's president lived—was followed. The Quebec–Miami International Highway, organized in 1911 and renamed the Atlantic Highway in 1915, also followed this corridor, overlapping many parts of the Capital Highway. It initially followed even less of US 1 than the Capital Highway, only taking the same route between Raleigh and Cameron and south of Rockingham, but was modified to match the Capital Highway by 1920.

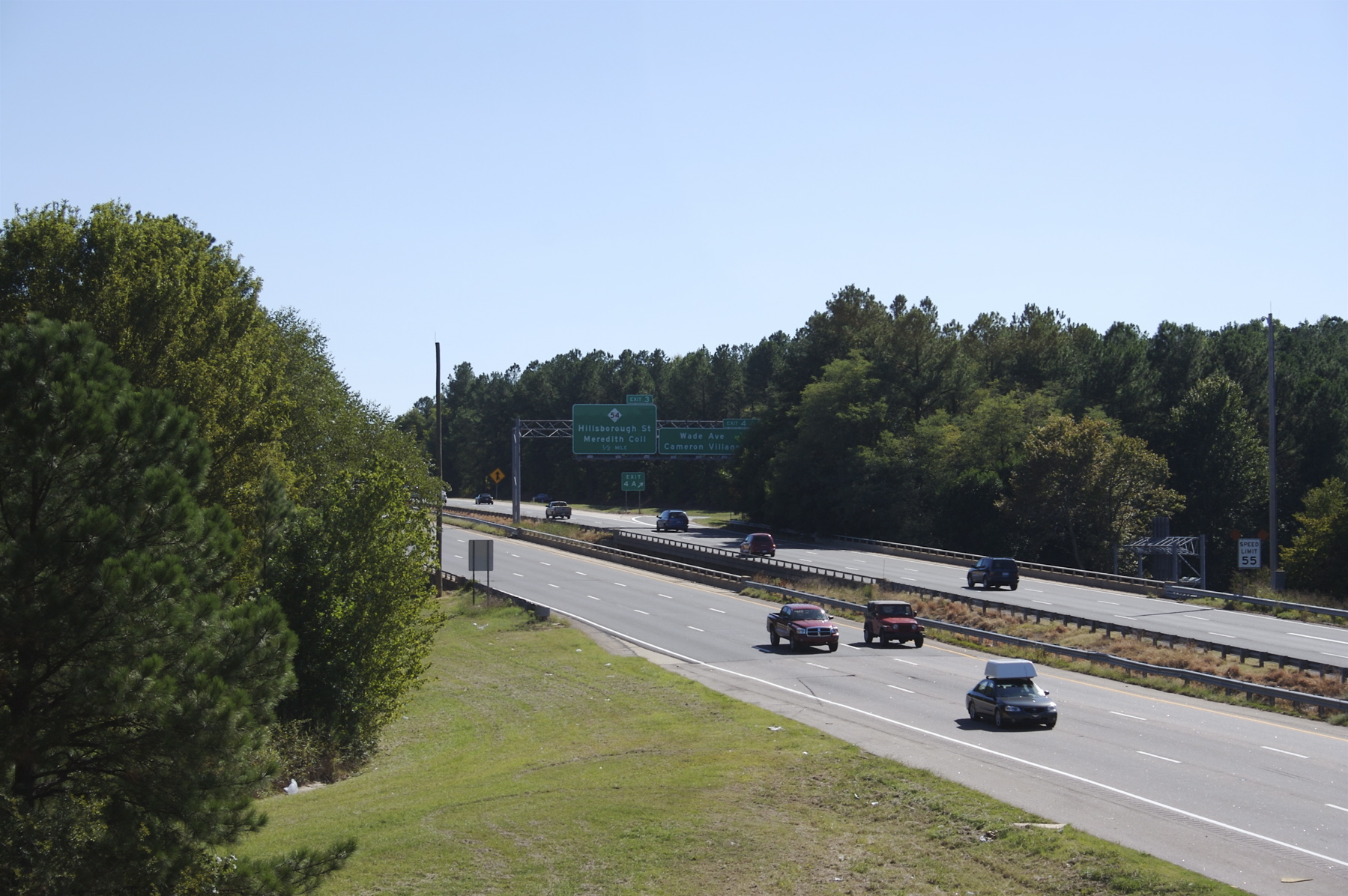
US 1 and I-440 travel concurrently on the Cliff Benson Beltline in East Raleigh.

In 1922, the route was designated as NC 50, from the South Carolina state line to Roanoke Rapids. In 1923, the route from Norlina to Roanoke Rapids was renumbered as NC 48; redirecting NC 50 north to Virginia and continuing on to South Hill, Virginia, as State Route 122. In 1926, US 1 was established, and it was assigned to overlap all of NC 50; it would be in 1934 when NC 50 was dropped from the route.

Since its establishment, US 1 has not changed its route from the South Carolina state line to Pinebluff. The first change along the route happened in 1930 in Raleigh, where minor road changes were done in the downtown area. In 1933, US 1 was moved off Rocky Fork Church Road near Tramway onto new road to the west. Between 1937 and 1944, US 1 was rerouted in Aberdeen to its current routing and also north of Wise where US 1 moved onto new road east of Mac Powell Road. In 1948, US 1 was removed from most of Wake Forest Road, in Raleigh, and placed onto Louisburg Road; the old route became US 1A. In 1953, US 1 was placed on a bypass west of Wake Forest, leaving the old route to become US 1A.

US 1 expressway northbound past the Morganton Road interchange in Southern Pines

Around 1956–1957, several changes along US 1 were made. A new bypass was built west of Sanford, the old route replaced by US 1A (later US 1 Bus.). In Raleigh, US 1 was redirected onto one-way streets, Dawson and McDowell, that connected to a new road called Capital Boulevard, which connected US 1 back onto Louisburg Road; Person Street and Wake Forest Road became secondary roads ever since. Finally, a new super-two bypass was built east of Henderson; which would later become a full freeway between 1991 and 1993.

In 1960, US 1 was placed on a super two, bypassing Moncure. Around 1963, US 1 was placed onto new freeway between Apex (via NC 55) to North Boulevard (today an extension of Capital Boulevard), in north Raleigh. The old route to Hillsborough Road became what is today Salem Street, Old Apex Road, and Chatham Street (via Cary), while the routing through Raleigh became US 1 Bus. (1963–1975). Around 1965, the super two, from Moncure, extended north into Apex. In 1975, the super two, from Moncure, extended south to Sanford, connecting to its bypass. The entire route between Sanford to Apex became a freeway by the mid-1990s.

In 1999, the North Carolina Department of Transportation (NCDOT) submitted a request to the American Association of State Highway and Transportation Officials (AASHTO) to designate 32.36 miles (52.08 km) of US 1 from I-40, in Raleigh, to the future US 421 (Sanford Bypass) interchange, in Sanford as I-140. On April 17, 1999, the request was disapproved by the committee and has since been dropped. I-140 was subsequently designated along the western part of the Wilmington Outer Loop in 2002.

In June 2005, a new freeway bypass was built east of Vass and Cameron; the old route became US 1 Bus.

In 2006, US 1 was widened from six to eight lanes on its concurrency with US 64 in Cary from Tryon Road to just south of the I-40/I-440 interchange; the interchanges with Cary Parkway (exit 99) and Walnut Street (exit 101) were also reconfigured.

== Future ==
NCDOT, in collaboration with the Department of Commerce and the Department of Environmental Quality, has designated US 1 as a Strategic Highway Corridor from I-85 in Henderson to the South Carolina state line. From I-85 to I-540 in Raleigh, US 1 is recommended to be improved to a freeway. From I-540 to I-440 (the Capital Boulevard section in Raleigh) it is recommended be improved to an expressway (nearby freeway I-540 will maintain mobility). From I-440 to south of I-74/US 220 in Richmond County, it is designated as a freeway. South of I-74 to the South Carolina state line, it is designated as an expressway. The Strategic Corridors Initiative is an effort to protect and maximize mobility and connectivity on a core set of highway corridors, while promoting environmental stewardship through maximizing the use of existing facilities to the extent possible, and fostering economic prosperity through the quick and efficient movement of people and goods.

=== Warren County ===
US 1 is not designated as Strategic Highway Corridor from the Vance County Line to US 401, as it is a two-lane highway, with mobility being met by nearby I-85. However, the part of US 1 that is concurrent US 401 near I-85 is designated as a boulevard. (US 401 is designated as a boulevard from US 1 in Wake County to I-85). The small section of US 1 from I-85 to the Virginia state line is also not designated. The 2010 Warren County Comprehensive Transportation Plan, which addresses transportation needs to the year 2035, concurs with these recommendations. The plan was adopted by all Warren County municipalities and NCDOT in 2007 and 2008.

=== Vance County ===
The Comprehensive Transportation Plan for Vance County, which will address transportation needs to the year 2040, is currently under study. US 1 in Vance County from I-85 to the Warren County line is not designated as a Strategic Highway Corridor, as mobility is served by nearby I-85.

=== Franklin County ===
The Franklin County Comprehensive Transportation Plan, which addresses transportation needs to the year 2035, US 1 is recommended to be improved to a four-lane freeway throughout the county. The plan was adopted by all Franklin County Municipalities, the Capital Area Metropolitan Planning Organization, and NCDOT in 2011. Recently, a US 1 Corridor Study, managed by the Capital Area Metropolitan Organization, identified improvements between I-540 in Wake County to US 1A in Franklin County.

=== Wake County ===
Recently, a US 1 Corridor Study, managed by the Capital Area Metropolitan Organization, identified improvements between I-540 in Wake County to US 1A in Franklin County. A project to convert this section to freeway began in 2026.

As part of the widening project of I-40 to relieve the heavy traffic, the I-40/I-440/US 1/US 64 interchange is being redesigned. Construction is expected to begin in 2025 at a cost of $68.8 million.

=== Chatham County ===
In 2022, in conjunction with the planned construction of a new VinFast factory near Moncure, NCDOT announced planned improvements to several roads. These changes include rebuilding two interchanges on US 1. Exit 81 will be expanded to accommodate a widened Pea Ridge Road. Exit 84, currently at Old US 1, will be relocated to the nearby New Elam Church Road, which itself will be rerouted at its western end; the two roads and interchanges being used as access points for the new factory. The rebuilt interchanges are expected to be complete in time for a 2027 factory opening date.

=== Lee County ===
Based on the 2011 Lee County Comprehensive Transportation Plan, which addresses transportation needs to the year 2035, US 1 is recommended to be improved to a six-lane freeway from Chatham County to the US 15/US 501 split. The remainder to the Moore County line is recommended to be improved to a four-lane freeway. The improvements will increase capacity to address anticipated deficiencies and maintain statewide mobility. The plan was adopted by the county, Sanford, Broadway, and NCDOT in 2008.

=== Moore County ===
In 2011, NCDOT, Moore County, and the Triangle Rural Planning Organization started work on a Comprehensive Transportation Plan to plan for future (2040) transportation improvements. State law calls on each municipality to work cooperatively with NCDOT to develop such a plan to serve present and future travel demand. In November 2011, seven public charrettes were held to document local priorities on five transportation areas within the county, including US 1.

Many in the community fear that a US 1 bypass project has been planned even though NCDOT has said repeatedly that there is no US 1 bypass or any other US 1 improvements identified. The strongest opposition of any type of US 1 improvement has come from some area residents, the equestrian community, and some business leaders. It is the aspiration of the opposition to lead towards no-build alternatives. However, since the Comprehensive Transportation Plan is based on 2040 travel demand, it is possible that no-build alternatives may not accommodate 2040 traffic, which may necessitate the need to plan for some type of future improvements.

Moore County Commissioners held a meeting on December 15, 2011, and passed a resolution against a US 1 bypass. Furthermore, the Southern Pines town council voted 4–1 against any US 1 improvements. Southern Pines Town Council member Fred Walden was the only dissenter on a US 1 bypass.

At this time, the cooperative effort to develop a Comprehensive Transportation Plan for Moore County is continuing. The plan, which includes US 1, must address existing and future traffic and balance local priorities with future transportation needs. In a February 2012 meeting with the town of Aberdeen, local officials raised concerns over the improvement of US 1. NCDOT officials stated that there are "no lines on maps for any roads at this point". Also, it was conveyed that without a Comprehensive Transportation Plan, money for future projects may be "adversely affected".

=== Richmond County ===
As of December 2011, there has been no opposition for a proposed north–south Rockingham bypass. The widening project from the Moore County line to near NC 177 has been recently completed from a two-lane principal highway to mostly a five-lane road with a small divided section near the Mackall Airfield. US 1 is now four lanes or greater from the US 1/I-85 interchange in Henderson, Vance County. Once US 1 enters South Carolina, there is no intention of widening US 1 to Cheraw and points south to Camden

In December 2012, public hearings have been held in Richmond County for the $260-million (equivalent to $350 million in 2024) bypass. The project would begin at NC 177 and rejoin US 1 south of Rockingham by Sandhill Road, near the South Carolina state line.

== Junction list ==
| County | Location | mi | km | Exit | Destinations | Notes |
|---|---|---|---|---|---|---|
| Richmond | | 0.0 | 0.0 | | US 1 south – Cheraw | Continuation into South Carolina |
| Richmond | Rockingham | 9.5 | 15.3 | | I-74 / US 74 – Laurinburg, Monroe | US 74 exit 311 |
| Richmond | Rockingham | 10.9 | 17.5 | | US 220 north – Asheboro | Southern terminus of US 220 |
| Richmond | Rockingham | 11.6 | 18.7 | | US 74 Bus. (Broad Avenue) – Wadesboro, Hamlet | |
| Richmond | | 22.3 | 35.9 | | NC 177 – Hamlet | |
| Moore | Aberdeen | 37.7 | 60.7 | | US 15 south / US 501 south / NC 211 east (Poindexter Street) – Laurinburg, Raeford | South end of US 15/US 501 and east end of NC 211 overlap |
| Moore | Aberdeen | 37.9 | 61.0 | | NC 5 (South Street) – Pinehurst | |
| Moore | Aberdeen | 39.5 | 63.6 | | US 15 north / US 501 north / NC 211 west – Pinehurst | North end of US 15/US 501 and west end of NC 211 overlap |
| Moore | Southern Pines | 40.5 | 65.2 | | Old U.S. Highway 1 – Southern Pines Business District | Northbound exit and southbound entrance |
| Moore | Southern Pines | 40.8 | 65.7 | | Morganton Road | No southbound entrance |
| Moore | Southern Pines | 41.6 | 66.9 | | Pennsylvania Avenue | |
| Moore | Southern Pines | 42.7 | 68.7 | | NC 2 west (Midland Road) to NC 22 – Carthage, Pinehurst, Whispering Pines | Two northbound exits; to Sandhills Community College and Moore County Airport |
| Moore | Vass | 49.4 | 79.5 | | US 1 Bus. north – Vass | |
| Moore | Vass | 50.3 | 81.0 | | NC 690 (Main Street) – Vass | |
| Moore | Cameron | 55.7 | 89.6 | | NC 24 / NC 27 (Carthage Street) – Cameron, Lillington, Fayetteville | |
| Lee | | 58.8 | 94.6 | | US 1 Bus. south – Cameron | Superstreet intersection |
| Lee | | 62.1 | 99.9 | | US 15 south / US 501 south (Whitehill Road) – Pinehurst, Carthage | South end of US 15/US 501 overlap |
| Lee | Tramway | 64.4 | 103.6 | | NC 78 east (Tramway Road) | |
| Lee | Sanford | 66.7 | 107.3 | 66 | US 1 Bus. north / NC 42 (Wicker Street) – Asheboro, Fuquay-Varina | |
| Lee | Sanford | 68.0 | 109.4 | 68 | Spring Lane | |
| Lee | Sanford | 68.5 | 110.2 | 69A | US 421 Bus. / NC 87 south (Horner Boulevard) – Dunn, Greensboro | South end of NC 87 overlap |
| Lee | Sanford | 69.1 | 111.2 | 69B | Burns Drive / Canterbury Road | |
| Lee | Sanford | 69.6 | 112.0 | 70 | US 421 / NC 87 Byp. south (Oscar Keller Jr. Highway) – Lillington, Siler City, Greensboro | Signed as exits 70A (south) and 70B (north); US 421 exit 149 |
| Lee | Sanford | 70.8 | 113.9 | 71 | US 15 north / US 501 north / US 1 Bus. south / NC 87 north – Pittsboro, Chapel Hill | North end of US 15/US 501/NC 87 overlap |
| Lee | | 73.8 | 118.8 | 74 | Colon Road | |
| Lee | | 76.3 | 122.8 | 76 | Farrell Road | |
| Lee | | 78.7 | 126.7 | 78 | Deep River Road | |
| Chatham | Moncure | 79.5 | 127.9 | 79 | Moncure-Pittsboro Road | |
| Chatham | | 81.7 | 131.5 | 81 | Pea Ridge Road | |
| Chatham | Merry Oaks | 84.4 | 135.8 | 84 | Old U.S. Highway 1 - Bonsal, New Hill | |
| Wake | New Hill | 89.1 | 143.4 | 89 | New Hill Holleman Road | To NC 751 |
| Wake | | 93.0 | 149.7 | 93 | NC 540 Toll (Triangle Expressway) – Holly Springs, Fuquay-Varina, RDU Airport, Durham | Signed as exits 93A (south) and 93B (north) |
| Wake | Apex | 95.1 | 153.0 | 95 | NC 55 (Williams Street) – Apex, Holly Springs, Fuquay-Varina | |
| Wake | Apex | 96.5 | 155.3 | 96 | Ten Ten Road | |
| Wake | Cary | 98.2 | 158.0 | 98A | Tryon Road | |
| Wake | Cary | 98.5 | 158.5 | 98B | US 64 west – Apex, Pittsboro, Asheboro | West end of US 64 overlap |
| Wake | Cary | 99.6 | 160.3 | 99 | Cary Parkway | |
| Wake | Cary | 101.3 | 163.0 | 101 | Walnut Street, Buck Jones Road, Crossroads Boulevard | Signed as exits 101A (Walnut Street) and 101B (Buck Jones Road, Crossroads Boulevard) southbound; southbound access via I-440 exit 1 |
| Wake | Raleigh | 101.9 | 164.0 | 1 | I-40 / US 64 east – Durham, Benson, Rocky Mount | East end of US 64 and west end of I-440 overlap; Signed as exits 1A (east) and 1B (west); I-40 exit 293 |
| Wake | Raleigh | 102.8 | 165.4 | 1C | Jones Franklin Road | |
| Wake | Raleigh | 103.9 | 167.2 | 1D | Melbourne Road | Southbound exit and northbound entrance |
| Wake | Raleigh | 104.4 | 168.0 | 2 | Western Boulevard – Downtown Raleigh, Cary | Diverging diamond interchange |
| Wake | Raleigh | 105.5 | 169.8 | 3A | NC 54 (Hillsborough Street) – Meredith College | |
| Wake | Raleigh | 105.8 | 170.3 | 3B-C | To I-40 west / Wade Avenue – Cameron Village, Durham | Signed southbound as exits 3B (east) and 3C (west); access to the RDU International Airport |
| Wake | Raleigh | 106.9 | 172.0 | 5 | Lake Boone Trail | |
| Wake | Raleigh | 108.2 | 174.1 | 6 | Ridge Road | Northbound exit and entrance; southbound exit is part of exit 7A |
| Wake | Raleigh | 108.5 | 174.6 | 7 | US 70 / NC 50 (Glenwood Avenue) / Ridge Road – Crabtree Valley, Durham | Signed southbound as exits 7A (east) and 7B (west) |
| Wake | Raleigh | 110.3 | 177.5 | 8 | Six Forks Road – North Hills | Signed as exits 8A (south) and 8B (north) |
| Wake | Raleigh | 111.5 | 179.4 | 10 | Wake Forest Road | To be converted into a diverging diamond interchange |
| Wake | Raleigh | 112.6 | 181.2 | 11 | I-440 east / US 401 south (Capital Boulevard) – Rocky Mount | East end of I-440 and south end US 401 overlap |
| Wake | Raleigh | 115.2 | 185.4 | | US 401 north (Louisburg Road) – Rolesville, Louisburg | North end US 401 overlap |
| Wake | Raleigh | 117.8 | 189.6 | | I-540 – Durham, Louisburg | |
| Wake | Raleigh | 119.3 | 192.0 | | Durant Road / Perry Creek Road | Future interchange. |
| Wake | Wake Forest | 121.3 | 195.2 | | Burlington Mills Road | Future interchange. |
| Wake | Wake Forest | 123.4 | 198.6 | | US 1A north (Main Street) / Falls of the Neuse Road – Wake Forest | Future upgrade to diverging diamond interchange, was originally funded and scheduled to begin construction in 2021; project has since been unfunded and delayed with construction not scheduled to start until 2035. |
| Wake | Wake Forest | 124.5 | 200.4 | 124 | NC 98 – Wake Forest, Durham | |
| Wake | Wake Forest | 125.5 | 202.0 | 125 | NC 98 Bus. (Durham Road) – Wake Forest Downtown | |
| Wake | Wake Forest | 127.7 | 205.5 | | Purnell Road / Harris Road | Future interchange (funded), scheduled to begin construction in 2024. |
| Franklin | Youngsville | 130.7 | 210.3 | | NC 96 – Oxford, Youngsville | |
| Franklin | Youngsville | 131.7 | 212.0 | | US 1A south – Youngsville | |
| Franklin | | 133.8 | 215.3 | | US 1A north (Main Street) – Franklinton | |
| Franklin | Franklinton | 135.3 | 217.7 | | NC 56 (Green Street) – Franklinton, Creedmoor | |
| Franklin | Franklinton | 136.3 | 219.4 | | US 1A south (Main Street) – Franklinton | |
| Vance | | 145.2 | 233.7 | | US 1 Bus. north (Raleigh Road) | |
| Vance | | 147.9 | 238.0 | | US 1 Bus. north (Raleigh Road) – Henderson | Northbound exit and southbound entrance |
| Vance | | 148.5 | 239.0 | | Bearpond Road | |
| Vance | Henderson | 150.2 | 241.7 | | Vanco Mill Road | |
| Vance | Henderson | 151.7 | 244.1 | | NC 39 (Andrews Avenue) – Henderson | |
| Vance | Henderson | 154.0 | 247.8 | | Warrenton Road | |
| Vance | Henderson | 155.2 | 249.8 | | To I-85 north / US 158 west / US 1 Bus. south (Garnett Street) – Richmond, Henderson | West end of US 158 overlap; freeway continues onto north I-85 |
| Vance | Middleburg | 157.8 | 254.0 | | I-85 – Richmond, Durham | I-85 exit 220 |
| Warren | Norlina | 166.3 | 267.6 | | US 158 east / US 401 south – Warrenton | East end of US 158 and south end of US 401 overlap |
| Warren | | 173.3 | 278.9 | | I-85 / US 401 – Richmond, Durham | North end of US 401 overlap; I-85 exit 233 |
| Warren | | 174.1 | 280.2 | | US 1 north – South Hill | Continuation into Virginia |
1.000 mi = 1.609 km; 1.000 km = 0.621 mi: Concurrency terminus; Incomplete access; Tolled

== See also ==
- Special routes of U.S. Route 1
- North Carolina Bicycle Route 4 - Concurrent with US 1 near Norlina

U.S. Route 1
| Previous state: South Carolina | North Carolina | Next state: Virginia |
