= North Carolina Highway 97 =

State highway in North Carolina, US

North Carolina Highway 97

Route information
- Maintained by NCDOT
- Length: 64.3 mi (103.5 km)
- Existed: 1961–present

Major junctions
- West end: US 64 Bus. in Wendell
- US 264 in Zebulon; I-95 near Winstead Crossroads; US 301 in Rocky Mount; US 64 / NC 43 in Rocky Mount
- East end: NC 122 near Hobgood

Location
- Country: United States
- State: North Carolina
- Counties: Wake, Franklin, Nash, Edgecombe, Halifax

Highway system
- North Carolina Highway System; Interstate; US; State; Scenic
← NC 96	→ NC 98

North Carolina Highway 97 (NC 97) is a primary state highway in the U.S. state of North Carolina, connecting the cities of Zebulon and Rocky Mount with the vast rural coastal plains.

== Route description ==
NC 97 begins at US 64 Business between the towns of Knightdale and Wendell. The nearest community is the unincorporated Eagle Rock. Through Wake County, the route closely parallels US 64, following it 1/2 mile (0.80 km) to the south. After passing through the unincorporated community of Lizard Lick, NC 97 merges with US 64 Business and forms the main east–west street through the town of Zebulon, Gannon Avenue.

West of Zebulon, just past the Wake–Nash County line, NC 97 has an interchange with US 264. Through Nash County, NC 97 is mostly a rural road oriented east–west. After intersecting Interstate 95 (I-95), it turns to a more northeast–southwest alignment, passing Rocky Mount–Wilson Regional Airport, and then entering the city of Rocky Mount along West Raleigh Boulevard. In the center of Rocky Mount, NC 97 turns to a north–south alignment, and follows Arlington Street until it leaves the city, joining the east–west Cool Spring Road just north of the city limits. From here, NC 97 closely parallels the Tar River and through the small town of Leggett. After the bridge over Fishing Creek (a tributary of the Tar River), NC 97 intersects with US 258 and travels another five miles (8.0 km) before ending at an intersection with NC 122 just outside the town of Hobgood.

== History ==
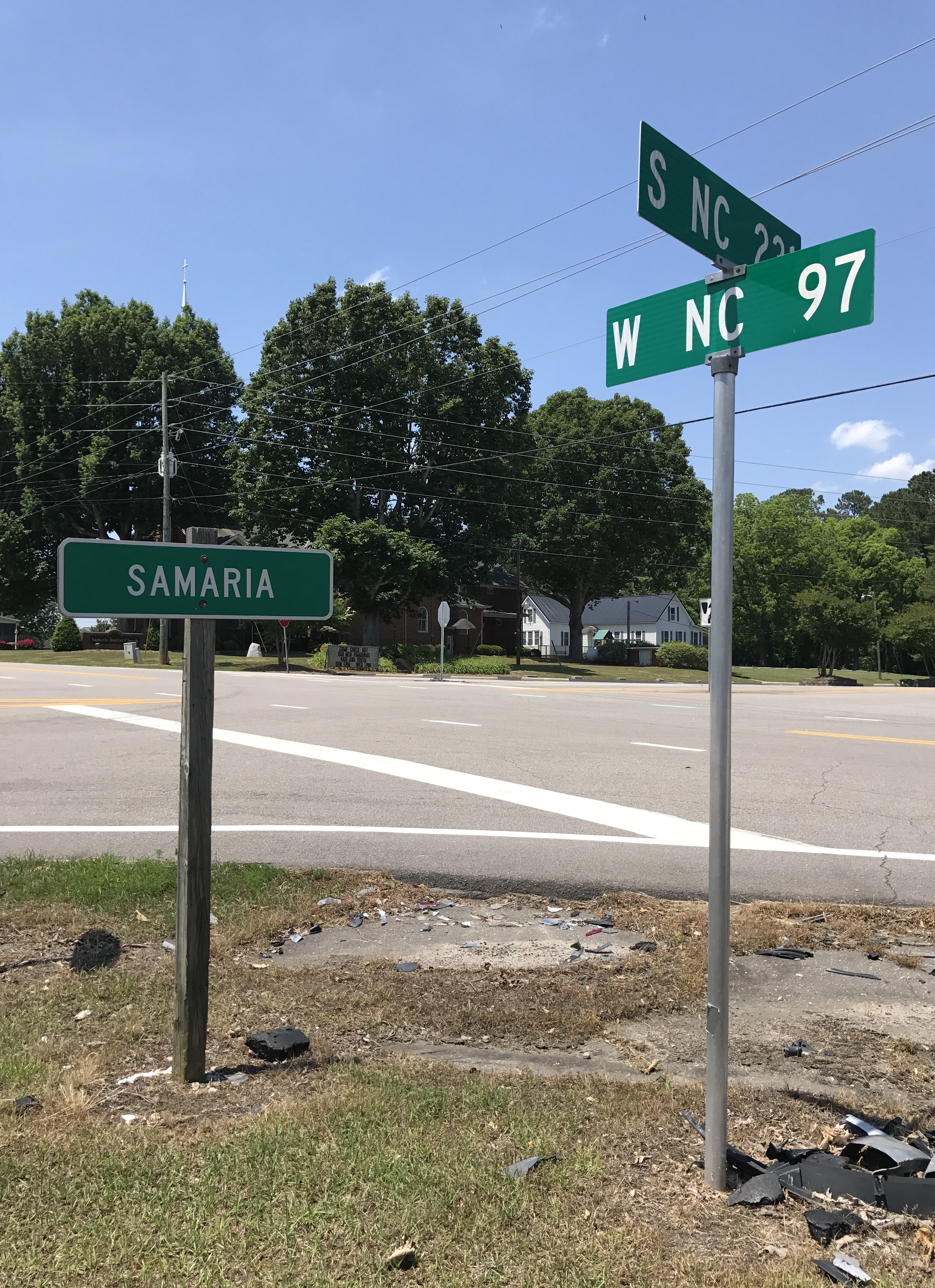
Highway 97 in Samaria, Nash County

There have been three designations of NC 97 since the creation of the North Carolina State Highway System in 1921. The first designation existed from 1920 to 1940 and was located between Plymouth and Pantego. In 1940, a second NC 97 was established travelling from Windsor to Winton and existed until 1952.

The current designation of NC 97 was originally designated as NC 95 from 1930 to 1961. The highway designation was changed to NC 97 in 1961, coinciding with the establishment of I-95 in the state.

=== Previous designations ===
North Carolina Highway 97
- Location: Pantego–Plymouth
- Length: 25 mi (40 km)
- Existed: 1922–1940

NC 97 first appeared as an original North Carolina State Highway, travelling from NC 91 in Pantego to NC 90 in Plymouth. The highway followed an unimproved roadway in a slightly northwesterly direction between the two locations. By 1929, the majority of NC 97's routing shifted. From Pantego, the highway followed a graded roadway to the northwest before making a turn slightly to the northeast as it neared the Beaufort–Washington County line. The highway continued in a slightly northeasterly orientation for the remainder of its route to Plymouth, making the highway 25-mile-long (40 km) in total. By 1935, NC 99 was established running from US 264 east of Bunyan to NC 97 in Beaufort County. This was the only connection to a numbered highway outside of NC 97's termini. NC 97 was eliminated by 1940, with its route from NC 99 to Plymouth becoming part of NC 32 and the route south of NC 99 to Pantego becoming a secondary road.

North Carolina Highway 97
- Location: Windsor–Virginia state line
- Length: 41 mi (66 km)
- Existed: 1940–1951

NC 97 reappeared on the 1940 North Carolina State Transportation map, travelling from US 17 in Windsor north through Powellsville and Ahoskie to NC 30 and NC 35 in Winton. The highway replaced a six miles (nine point seven kilometres) segment of NC 30 north of Windsor, a second segment of NC 30 between Ahoskie and Winton, in addition to all of NC 30A. At the time of establishment, all of NC 97 was paved except for an 11 miles (18 km) segment south of Powellsville which was classified as a gravel road. This segment was paved by 1948. NC 97 was extended north from Winton to NC 37 one mile (one point six kilometres) south of the North Carolina–Virginia state line by 1949. From Winton, the highway followed a concurrency with US 158 for six miles (nine point seven kilometres) until splitting onto its own routing west of Roduco. NC 97 then ran northeast for eight miles (thirteen kilometres) until reaching NC 37. It joined in concurrency with NC 37 to the north for approximately one mile (one point six kilometres) until reaching its new terminus at the North Carolina–Virginia state line. The highway continued north as Virginia State Route 37. In 1951, the entirety of NC 97 was replaced by an extension of US 13.

=== Current routing ===
NC 97 was originally NC 95 in the 1930s. It was renumbered in 1961 to avoid conflict with I-95. In 1975, its western terminus was extended to replace the old alignment of US 64 Business north of Wendell; a new US 64 Bypass freeway was built farther north of Wendell.

==== North Carolina Highway 95 ====
North Carolina Highway 95
- Location: Zebulon–Hobgood
- Length: 59.0 mi (95.0 km)
- Existed: 1930–1961

North Carolina Highway 95 (NC 95) was established in 1930 as a new primary routing from NC 40 in Rocky Mount to NC 12 in Lawrence. In 1933, NC 95 was extended south along US 301/NC 40 through Rocky Mount, then west on new routing to US 64/US 264/NC 39/NC 90/NC 91 in Zebulon. In 1935, NC 95 was extended east to NC 122 near Hobgood. In 1961, because of the establishment of I-95, NC 95 was renumbered as NC 97.

== Major intersections ==
County	Location	mi	km	Destinations	Notes
Wake	Wendell	0.0	0.0	US 64 Bus. (Wendell Boulevard) – Raleigh	Western terminus
Wake	Zebulon	4.8	7.7	US 64 Bus. west (Mack Todd Road)	West end of US 64 Bus. overlap
Wake	Zebulon	5.3	8.5	US 64 Bus. east / NC 96 (Arendell Avenue) – Selma, Youngsville	East end of US 64 Bus. overlap
Wake	Zebulon	6.7	10.8	US 264 – Raleigh, Wilson	
Wake		7.9	12.7	NC 39 – Smithfield, Louisburg	
Franklin	No major junctions				
Nash	Samaria	13.6	21.9	NC 231 – Middlesex, Spring Hope	
Nash	Stanhope	18.1	29.1	NC 581 – Bailey, Spring Hope	
Nash		25.5	41.0	I-95 – Wilson, Roanoke Rapids	
Nash	Winstead Crossroads	28.2	45.4	NC 58 – Wilson, Nashville	
Nash	Rocky Mount	36.0	57.9	US 301 (Weslayan Boulevard) – Wilson, Weldon	
Nash	Rocky Mount	38.4	61.8	US 301 Bus. (Franklin Street) – Wilson	One-way street, must take southbound to access northbound
Nash	Rocky Mount	39.1	62.9	US 64 Bus. east (Tarboro Street)	One-way street
Nash	Rocky Mount	39.3	63.2	US 64 Bus. west (Thomas Street)	One-way street
Nash	Rocky Mount	39.7	63.9	NC 43 Bus. (Grand Avenue)	
Nash	Rocky Mount	40.3	64.9	US 64 / NC 43 – Tarboro, Raleigh	
Edgecombe	Leggett	53.6	86.3	NC 33 – Tarboro, Whitakers	
Edgecombe	Lawrence	58.7	94.5	US 258 – Tarboro, Scotland Neck	To Sylvan Heights Bird Park
Halifax		64.3	103.5	NC 122 – Tarboro, Hobgood	Eastern terminus
1.000 mi = 1.609 km; 1.000 km = 0.621 mi: Concurrency terminus

== North Carolina Highway 95A ==
North Carolina Highway 95A
- Location: Rocky Mount
- Length: 5.4 mi (8.7 km)
- Existed: 1932–1940

North Carolina Highway 95A (NC 95A) was an alternate spur route from NC 95 to US 64/NC 90 (Thomas Avenue), via Legget Road, Myrtle Avenue, Grand Avenue and Atlantic Avenue. By around 1940, it was downgraded to secondary road (SR 1243).

Major intersections

The entire route was in Rocky Mount.

County	mi	km	Destinations	Notes
Nash	0.0	0.0	US 64 / US 301 / NC 95	Western terminus; western end of the US 64 overlap.
Edgecombe	0.2	0.32	US 64 – Tarboro	Eastern end of the US 64 overlap.
Edgecombe	5.4	8.7	NC 95 – Leggett	Eastern terminus.
1.000 mi = 1.609 km; 1.000 km = 0.621 mi
