= Warren County Training School =

Historic school building in North Carolina, United States

- U.S. National Register of Historic Places
- Location within North Carolina Location within the United States
- Location: East side of NC 1300, 0.8 N of NC 1372, near Wise, North Carolina
- Coordinates: 36°30′56″N 78°9′59″W
- Area: 6.5 acres (2.6 ha)
- Built: 1925, 1931, c. 1955
- Architectural style: Rosenwald School
- NRHP reference No.: 06000294
- Added to NRHP: April 19, 2006

Warren County Training School is a historic Rosenwald School located near Wise, Warren County, North Carolina. It was built in 1931, and is a large, one-story, nine classroom brick school. It measures approximately 222 feet by 58 feet, with a rear wing measuring 42 feet by 59 feet. Also on the property are the contributing teacherage (principal's residence) (1925), brick cafeteria building (c. 1955), and brick agricultural building (c. 1955). The complex continued to operate as a school until 1970. The Warren County Training School is one of 25 schools that were constructed using Rosenwald funds in Warren County.

It was listed on the National Register of Historic Places in 2006.
