= South Carolina Highway 154 =

State highway in South Carolina, United States

South Carolina Highway 154

Route information
- Maintained by SCDOT
- Length: 16.680 mi (26.844 km)

Major junctions
- South end: US 76 in Mayesville
- US 401 in St. Charles
- North end: US 15 in Bishopville

Location
- Country: United States
- State: South Carolina
- Counties: Sumter, Lee

Highway system
- South Carolina State Highway System; Interstate; US; State; Scenic
← SC 153	→ SC 157

South Carolina Highway 154 (SC 154) is a 16.680-mile-long (26.844 km) state highway in the U.S. state of South Carolina. The highway connects Mayesville and Bishopville.

== Route description ==
SC 154 begins at an intersection with U.S. Route 76 (US 76; Florence Highway) in Mayesville, within Sumter County, where the roadway continues as Mayes Open Road. It travels to the north-northwest and enters Lee County. In St. Charles, it intersects US 401 (Darlington Highway). The highway passes Lower Lee Elementary School and goes through rural areas of the county. It passes over, but does not have an interchange with Interstate 20. A short distance later, it enters Bishopville, where it meets its northern terminus, an intersection with US 15 (Sumter Highway).

== Major intersections ==
County	Location	mi	km	Destinations	Notes
Sumter	Mayesville	0.000	0.000	US 76 (Florence Highway) – Sumter, Florence	Southern terminus
Lee	St. Charles	6.150	9.897	US 401 (Darlington Highway) – Sumter, Darlington	
Lee	Bishopville	16.680	26.844	US 15 (Sumter Highway) – Sumter	Northern terminus
1.000 mi = 1.609 km; 1.000 km = 0.621 mi
