= Cary Parkway =

Coordinates: 35.7704288°N 78.8405624°W

Route information
- Length: 12.6 mi (20.3 km)
- Existed: 1980s–present

Major junctions
- South end: Holly Springs Rd. in Cary
- US 1 / US 64 in Cary; NC 54 in Cary
- North end: Harrison Ave. in Cary

Location
- Country: United States
- State: North Carolina
- Counties: Wake

Highway system
- North Carolina Highway System; Interstate; US; State; Scenic

Cary Parkway (SR 3977) is a major semi-circular route through Cary, North Carolina, United States. The parkway serves approximately as Cary's outer ring highway, though it does not form a complete circle like the inner ring, Maynard Road. Viewing a map of the town as a clock-face, Cary Parkway extends counterclockwise approximately from the 12 o'clock position in the north down to the 7 o'clock position in the southwest. At that point, the road departs from its circular path and heads south toward its terminus at Holly Springs Road.

== Route description ==
Cary Parkway was built and widened in many stages over two decades, with one of the first stretches running from Seabrook Avenue to High Meadow Drive in south-central Cary. When it was originally built, the road was a two-lane road and was not striped. The intersection with Kildaire Farm Road were stop signs. In the mid-1980s the Town of Cary expanded the highway across US 1/64 to Holly Springs Road in East Cary, creating an interchange at 64/1 and widening the part of the parkway east of Kildaire Farm Road to a four-lane divided highway. West of Kildaire Farm road, the parkway remained a two-lane undivided road up to its original western terminus at Old Apex Road (this segment was not widened to four lanes until the late 1990s). West of that intersection, a four-lane divided part in the road was constructed from scratch in the late 1980s and originally dead-ended just south of High House Road in western Cary for several years. Separately, a small unconnected stretch of Cary Parkway ran from west of Harrison Avenue to well east of Evans Road. During the second stretch of expansion, this portion of the parkway was connected to the portion ending south of High House Road (passing through a short stretch of the town of Morrisville along the way), and extended eastward to Harrison Avenue. Currently, the only portion of the parkway that remains a two-lane undivided roadway is the segment running from just east of Evans Road to just west of Harrison Avenue.

== Future ==
There have been several discussions of extending the parkway. To the southeast, one plan brought the parkway from Holly Springs Road to Gorman Street in Raleigh. To the northeast, there has been talk of extending the parkway eastward from Harrison Avenue toward Trinity Road and I-40 in northeast Cary. This expansion has been approved by the town although construction has not begun.

== Junction list ==
The entire route is in Cary, Wake County.

mi	km	Destinations	Notes
0.3	0.48	Holly Springs Road	
1.1	1.8	Lochmere Drive	
1.5	2.4	Tryon Road	
2.3	3.7	US 1 / US 64 – Raleigh, Apex, Sanford	
3.3	5.3	Kildaire Farm Road	
4.8	7.7	Lake Pine Drive	
5.7	9.2	Old Apex Road	
6.4	10.3	Westhigh Street	
6.5	10.5	Chatham Street	
6.9	11.1	Bond Lake Drive - Mac Arthur Drive	
7.4	11.9	Bebington Drive - Waldo Rood Boulevard	
7.6	12.2	Huntsmoor - Towne Village Drive	
8.2	13.2	High House Road	To Fred G. Bond Metro Park
9.4	15.1	James Jackson Avenue	
9.9	15.9	NC 54 (Chapel Hill Road) – Morrisville, Chapel Hill	
10.8	17.4	Evans Road	
12.6	20.3	Harrison Avenue	
1.000 mi = 1.609 km; 1.000 km = 0.621 mi
