= Virginia State Route 96 =

State highway in Halifax County, Virginia, US

State Route 96

Route information
- Maintained by VDOT
- Length: 7.83 mi (12.60 km)
- Existed: 1940–present

Major junctions
- West end: US 501 near Cluster Springs
- SR 49 / SR 734 in Virgilina
- East end: NC 49 / NC 96 in Virgilina

Location
- Country: United States
- State: Virginia
- Counties: Halifax

Highway system
- Virginia Routes; Interstate; US; Primary; Secondary; Byways; History; HOT lanes
← I-95	→ SR 97

State Route 96 (SR 96) is a primary state highway in the U.S. state of Virginia. Known for most of its length as Virgilina Road, the state highway runs 7.83 miles (12.60 km) from U.S. Route 501 (US 501) near Cluster Springs east to the North Carolina state line in Virgilina. In Virgilina, SR 96 runs concurrently with SR 49 south to the border, where the highways continue as North Carolina Highway 96 (NC 96) and NC 49, respectively.

== Route description ==
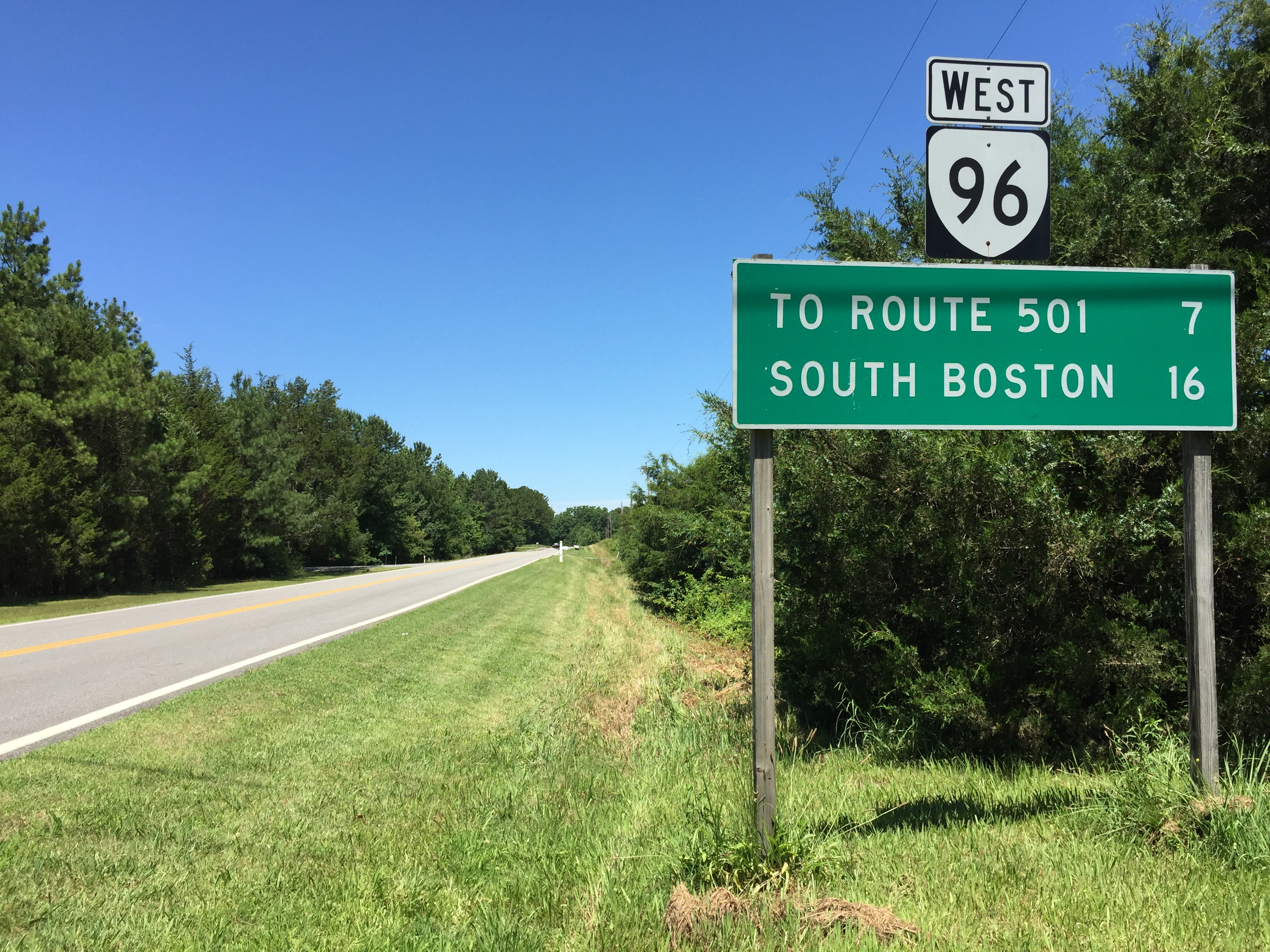
View west along SR 96 just west of Virgilina

SR 96 begins at an intersection with US 501 (Huell Matthews Highway) south of Cluster Springs in southern Halifax County. The state highway heads southeast as Virgilina Road, which crosses Mayo Creek. East of Bluewing Creek, SR 96 heads east to the town of Virgilina, where the highway follows 7th Street. In the center of town, the state highway meets SR 49 at Florence Avenue. Northbound SR 49 follows 7th Street toward Clarksville while both state highways turn south onto Florence Avenue. After crossing over the former alignment of the Norfolk, Franklin and Danville Railway, the two highways reach their respective termini at the North Carolina state line. The two highways, which retain their numbers south of the border, continue south for a short distance before diverging; NC 49 heads southwest toward Roxboro and NC 96 heads southeast toward Oxford.

== History ==
SR 96 was originally part of State Route 302, added in 1931 from State Route 18 (now US 501) east three miles (5 km) towards Virgilina. By 1932, this southern piece of SR 302 became part of State Route 59, and that year it was extended east the rest of the way to Virgilina. In the 1933 renumbering, all of SR 59 became part of State Route 49. The piece west of Virgilina, as well as the several blocks south to the state line in Virgilina (which had not been numbered before then), became State Route 96 in the 1940 renumbering to match North Carolina Highway 96.

== Major intersections ==
The entire route is in Halifax County.

Location	mi	km	Destinations	Notes
	0.00	0.00	US 501 (Huell Matthews Highway) – Roxboro, NC, South Boston	Western terminus
Virgilina	7.70	12.39	SR 49 north (Seventh Street) / SR 734 (Florence Avenue) – Clarksville, Red Bank	Western end of SR 49 concurrency
Virgilina	7.83	12.60	NC 49 south / NC 96 south – Roxboro, Oxford	North Carolina state line; eastern terminus; eastern end of SR 49 concurrency
1.000 mi = 1.609 km; 1.000 km = 0.621 mi: Concurrency terminus

< SR 301	District 3 State Routes; 1928–1933	SR 303 >
