= William A. Jeffreys House =

Historic house in North Carolina, United States

- U.S. National Register of Historic Places
- Location within North Carolina Location within the United States
- Location: SE of Youngsville on SR 1101, near Youngsville, North Carolina
- Coordinates: 35°57′22″N 78°23′41″W
- Area: 6 acres (2.4 ha)
- Built: c. 1842
- Architectural style: Federal, tripartite house type
- NRHP reference No.: 76001323
- Added to NRHP: June 23, 1976

William A. Jeffreys House is a historic plantation house located near Youngsville, Franklin County, North Carolina. It was built about 1842, and is a Federal style frame dwelling consisting of a two-story central block with flanking one-story wings. It has a Greek Revival style interior finish.

It was listed on the National Register of Historic Places in 1976.
