= St. Charles, South Carolina =

- Census-designated place
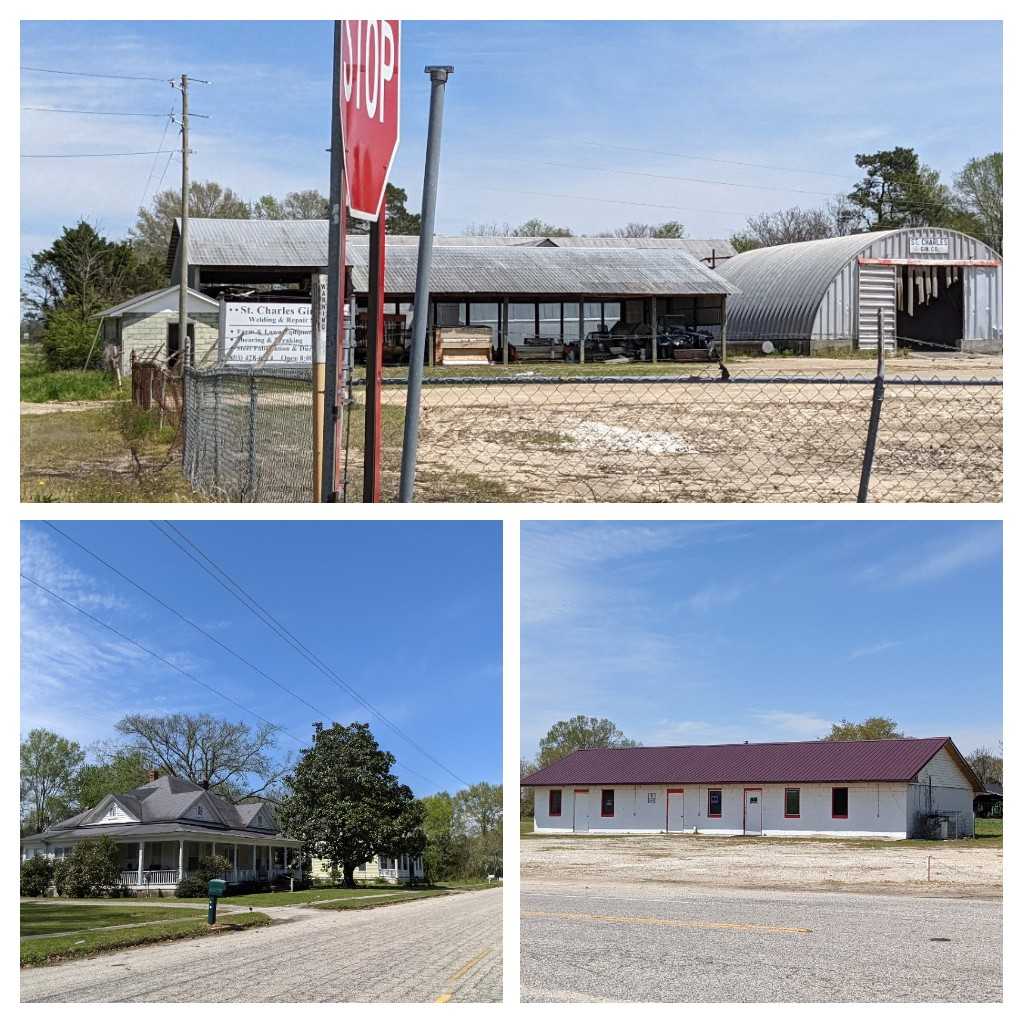
- Buildings in St. Charles

- Location within South Carolina Location within the United States
- Coordinates: 34°05′06″N 80°14′15″W
- Country: United States
- State: South Carolina
- County: Lee

Area
  - Total: 4.24 sq mi (10.97 km^{2})
  - Land: 4.24 sq mi (10.97 km^{2})
  - Water: 0 sq mi (0.00 km^{2})
- Elevation: 174 ft (53 m)

Population (2020)
  - Total: 114
  - Density: 26.9/sq mi (10.39/km^{2})
- Time zone: UTC-5 (Eastern (EST))
  - Summer (DST): UTC-4 (EDT)
- ZIP Codes: 29010 (Bishopville); 29104 (Mayesville)
- Area codes: 803/839
- FIPS code: 45-62485
- GNIS feature ID: 2807067

St. Charles or Saint Charles is an unincorporated community and census-designated place (CDP) in Lee County, South Carolina, United States. It was first listed as a CDP prior to the 2020 census with a population of 114.

The CDP is in southern Lee County, at the junction of U.S. Route 401 and South Carolina Highway 154. Highway 401 leads northeast 25 miles (40 km) to Darlington and southwest 13 miles (21 km) to Sumter, while Highway 154 leads north 11 miles (18 km) to Bishopville and south 6 miles (10 km) to Mayesville.

== Demographics ==
Historical population
Census	Pop.	Note	%±
2020	114		—
U.S. Decennial Census; 2020

St. Charles first appeared as a census designated place in the 2020 U.S. census.

=== 2020 census ===
St. Charles CDP, South Carolina – Demographic Profile (NH = Non-Hispanic)
Race / Ethnicity	Pop 2020	% 2020
White alone (NH)	49	42.98%
Black or African American alone (NH)	59	51.75%
Native American or Alaska Native alone (NH)	0	0.00%
Asian alone (NH)	0	0.00%
Pacific Islander alone (NH)	0	0.00%
Some Other Race alone (NH)	0	0.00%
Mixed Race/Multi-Racial (NH)	3	2.63%
Hispanic or Latino (any race)	3	2.63%
Total	114	100.00%

Note: the US Census treats Hispanic/Latino as an ethnic category. This table excludes Latinos from the racial categories and assigns them to a separate category. Hispanics/Latinos can be of any race.
