= North Carolina Highway 98 =

State highway in North Carolina, US

North Carolina Highway 98
- NC 98 highlighted in red; NC 98 Business highlighted in blue

Route information
- Maintained by NCDOT
- Length: 43.7 mi (70.3 km)
- Existed: 1934–present

Major junctions
- West end: US 15 Bus. / US 70 Bus. / US 501 Bus. in Durham
- I-885 / US 70 in Durham; US 1 in Wake Forest; US 1A in Wake Forest; US 401 near Youngsville
- East end: US 64 Alt. / NC 231 near Spring Hope

Location
- Country: United States
- State: North Carolina
- Counties: Durham, Wake, Franklin, Nash

Highway system
- North Carolina Highway System; Interstate; US; State; Scenic
← NC 97	→ NC 99

North Carolina Highway 98 (NC 98) is a primary state highway in the U.S. state of North Carolina and a semi-urban traffic artery connecting Durham, Wake Forest, and Bunn as well as many small to medium-sized towns in the north portion of The Triangle region of North Carolina. Running from downtown Durham, the route leaves the city to the east, running into a rural area near Falls Lake. As the road approaches Wake Forest, it widens to a four-lane divided highway and runs along the southern side of the city. Once leaving Wake Forest NC 98 becomes a two lane road again, running through rural areas east of Bunn. After a short concurrency with NC 39, NC 98 continues southeast to reach its eastern terminus at US 64 Alternate and NC 231 west of Spring Hope.

NC 98 first appeared in 1930 as a state route connecting NC 91 and NC 102 in the coastal region of North Carolina. That routing was abolished in 1931 in favor of an extended NC 58. The current routing of NC 98 was established in 1934 with the road's western terminus at NC 91 (present-day Jones Dairy Road) to US 64 west of Spring Hope. In 1941, NC 98 was moved to a new section of road running from Zebulon Road to US 1 in Youngsville, which would later become part of NC 96. In 1952, NC 98 was again relocated along NC 264 through Wake Forest to Durham, and NC 96 took over its abandoned section. In 2003, a bypass was completed around Wake Forest leading to the rerouting of mainline NC 98 to the bypass and the establishment of a business route through the town center.

== Route description ==
NC 98 begins at US 15 Business/US 501 Business in downtown Durham. The eastbound lanes of the road begin at Roxboro Street, however the westbound lanes continue to Mangum Street along a one-way road. From its terminus, the road heads east along Holloway Street, following a concurrency with US 70 Business. Holloway Street continues to the I-885/US 70 interchange, where the US 70 Business concurrency ends. NC 98 continues running along Holloway Street, until intersecting Clayton Road, where it then become Wake Forest Highway. Wake Forest Highway continues to be the name for NC 98 throughout Durham County. The highway passes by Oak Grove Elementary School and Neal Middle School on the outskirts of Durham. Before leaving Durham County, the road passes over an extension of Falls Lake.

As the highway enters Wake County, the name changes to Durham Road, which stays the name of the road until Wake Forest. After an intersection with Old Creedmoor Road, NC 98 and NC 50 have a cloverleaf interchange. Continuing to the east, the road intersects Six Forks and New Light Roads, before once again crossing over Falls Lake. After passing by several neighborhoods and crossing over Falls Lake two more times, the road intersects Thompson Mill Road, where it widens from a two lane road to a four lane divided highway. After about one-half mile (0.80 km), the road intersects both Old Falls of Neuse Road and NC 98 Business. The name Durham Road changes to follow NC 98 Business and NC 98 continues to become the Dr. Calvin Jones Highway. After passing by the Wakefield neighborhood, the road has a single-point urban interchange with US 1 (Capital Boulevard). Continuing straight it goes on to intersects Galaxy Drive, US 1A (South Main Street), Franklin Street, and Heritage Lake Road, before meeting back up with NC 98 Business at the Wait Avenue/Jones Dairy Road intersection. After the intersection, NC 98 changes back into a two lane road, carrying the Wait Avenue name. The highway passes through a very rural area east of Wake Forest, with a few neighborhoods present. Wait Avenue intersects Averette Road at a stoplight, and then continues on to intersect NC 96 just north of Rolesville.

Continuing with the same Wait Avenue name into Franklin County, the highway intersects US 401 at an intersection with slip ramps. From there the road continues to go through a rural area east of Bunn with very few neighborhoods nearby. As the road enters into the downtown areas of Bunn, its name changes to Jewett Avenue. The road travels through a mainly residential area of the town before intersects NC 39 in the center of town. NC 98 turns right onto South Main Street to begin a concurrency with NC 39, which it follows for a little over one mile (1.6 km). South Main Street runs through the main commercial center of the town, and passes by Bunn High School before NC 39 turns off to the south. NC 98 continues southeast along its own highway, toward Spring Hope running through very rural areas of Nash County. As the highway reaches its terminus, a few houses appear along the southern side of the road. NC 98 has its eastern terminus at an intersection with US 64 Alternate, which continues east to Spring Hope and south to the US 64 freeway. This spot also marks the northern terminus of NC 231.

== History ==
NC 98 was established in 1934 as a renumbering of a section of NC 581; from NC 91 (Jones Dairy Road) in Wake Forest to US 64 west of Spring Hope. In 1940, it was truncated to a relocated NC 91 (Zebulon Road), with its routing west into Wake Forest becoming part of NC 91. In 1941, NC 98 was extended north as a new primary routing to US 1 in Youngsville. In 1952, NC 98 was rerouted west through Wake Forest ending in Durham, replacing NC 264; its former alignment became part of NC 96.

In 1975, NC 98 was rerouted in Durham: replacing the old alignment to US 15 Business/US 501 Business via Miami Boulevard and Geer Street, to Holloway Street (westbound)/Chapel Hill Street-Liberty Street (eastbound) and its current western terminus. In 1978, NC 98 replaced part of US 64's routing to its current eastern terminus. In 1981, part of NC 98 was abandoned and placed on new construction as a result of the creation of Falls Lake; remnants of the old alignment that were not submerged became secondary roads. In 2006, NC 98 was rerouted south along US 1 and onto a new four-lane bypass south of Wake Forest to Jones Dairy Road; its old alignment becoming NC 98 Business. In 2011, NC 98 was removed from US 1 and placed onto new construction east of Falls of Neuse Road; NC 98 Business was also realigned, starting further east along a new alignment of Durham Road.

The first NC 98 was established in 1930 as a new primary routing from NC 91 near Wilson, to NC 102 near Snow Hill. In 1931, it was decommissioned in favor of becoming part of NC 58.

=== North Carolina Highway 264 ===
North Carolina Highway 264
- Location: Zebulon–Durham
- Length: 44.5 mi (71.6 km)
- Existed: 1941–1952

North Carolina Highway 264 (NC 264) was formed in 1941 as a renumbering of NC 91. It went from the intersection at Roxboro and Greer streets in Durham to US 64/US 264 in Zebulon. It was renumbered in 1952. The route from current NC 98 to Zebulon was renumbered as NC 96. The rest of the route was renumbered as NC 98.

== Future ==
As of March 2017, NCDOT is conducting a study about the future of a 27-mile-long (43 km) stretch of the highway from US 70 in Durham to US 401 north of Rolesville. A public study is open until April 2017 but the study will not conclude until July 2018. At that point, the study group will recommend improvements to NC 98.

== Major intersections ==
County	Location	mi	km	Destinations	Notes
Durham	Durham	0.0	0.0	US 15 Bus. / US 501 Bus. south (Mangum Street) / US 70 Bus. west (Morgan Street)	NC 98 eastbound begin on Chapel Hill Street; NC 98 westbound end on Mangum Street; US 70 Bus westbound overlap ends
Durham	Durham	0.2	0.32	US 15 Bus. / US 501 Bus. north (Roxboro Street)	One block eastbound overlap with US 15 Bus/US 501 Bus along Roxboro Street; US 70 Bus eastbound overlap begins
Durham	Durham	0.9	1.4	NC 55 (Alston Avenue)	
Durham	Durham	2.2	3.5	I-885 / US 70 / US 70 Bus. ends – Raleigh, Burlington	East end of US 70 Bus overlap; I-885 exit 11
Wake		12.4	20.0	NC 50 (Creedmoor Road) – Raleigh, Creedmoor	Cloverleaf interchange
Wake	Wake Forest	20.0	32.2	NC 98 Bus. east (Durham Road)	
Wake	Wake Forest	21.0	33.8	US 1 (Capital Boulevard) – Raleigh, Henderson	Single-point urban interchange
Wake	Wake Forest	22.3	35.9	US 1A (Main Street) – Wake Forest	
Wake	Wake Forest	23.8	38.3	NC 98 Bus. west (Traditions Grande Boulevard/Jones Dairy Road) – Rolesville	
Wake		27.1	43.6	NC 96 (Zebulon Road) – Zebulon, Youngsville	
Franklin		29.1	46.8	US 401 – Rolesville, Raleigh, Louisburg	
Franklin	Bunn	37.6	60.5	NC 39 north (Main Street) – Louisburg	North end of NC 39 overlap
Franklin	Bunn	38.4	61.8	NC 39 south (Main Street) – Pilot	South end of NC 39 overlap
Nash		43.7	70.3	US 64 Alt. / NC 231 south to US 64 – Middlesex, Spring Hope	
1.000 mi = 1.609 km; 1.000 km = 0.621 mi: Concurrency terminus

== Special routes ==
=== Wake Forest business loop ===
North Carolina Highway 98 Business
- Location: Wake Forest, North Carolina
- Length: 4.1 mi (6.6 km)
- Existed: 2006–present

North Carolina Highway 98 Business (NC 98 Bus.) begins at the NC 98/Old Falls of Neuse Road intersection just north of Wakefield. The road runs northeast along the western edge of the Crenshaw Hall Plantation neighborhood. After about one-half mile (0.80 km) the road turns a more eastern direction following the old routing of NC 98 (Durham Road). The road has an interchange with US 1 (Capital Boulevard) in the western sections of Wake Forest. NC 98 Business continues to the east toward downtown Wake Forest. Once reaching downtown the road runs along the southern side of the Southeastern Baptist Seminary before having a roundabout intersection with US 1A. US 1A joins NC 98 Business and continues along the eastern side of the seminary. NC 98 Business turns right onto Roosevelt Avenue and enters downtown Wake Forest. The road merges into Wait Avenue and continues east out of downtown Wake Forest. Just before the road ends at NC 98 the road makes a 90 degree right turn before ending at the NC 98/Jones Dairy Road/NC 98 Business intersections. The road name Wait Avenue continues along NC 98 east.

NC 98 Business was first created running along Wait Avenue through Downtown and met NC 98 at the US 1A roundabout. This was a renumbering of NC 98 as the first sections of the Wake Forest bypass were put into place. As NC 98 was expanded to US 1, NC 98 Business expanded to cover all of the previous NC 98 routing east of US 1 and west of Jones Dairy Road. In September 2010 the third segment of NC 98 was opened from US 1 to Thompson Mill Road with the old routing between Thompson Mill Road and Fawn Drive being torn up and replaced with new routing which became NC 98 Business.

Junction list

The entire route is in Wake Forest, Wake County.

mi	km	Destinations	Notes
0.0	0.0	NC 98 (Doctor Calvin Jones Highway) / Old Falls of Neuse Road	
1.1– 1.2	1.8– 1.9	US 1 (Capital Boulevard) – Raleigh, Henderson	Interchange
2.7	4.3	US 1A south (S Main Street)	Roundabout, south end of UA 1A overlap
2.9	4.7	US 1A north (Front Street) – Youngsville	North end of US 1A overlap
4.1	6.6	NC 98 (Doctor Calvin Jones Highway) / Jones Dairy Road	
1.000 mi = 1.609 km; 1.000 km = 0.621 mi: Concurrency terminus
