= Wise, North Carolina =

Coordinates: 36.486°N 78.171°W

- Unincorporated community
- Interactive map of Wise, North Carolina
- Country: United States
- State: North Carolina
- County: Warren
- Founded: 1907

Area
  - Total: 2.52 sq mi (6.53 km^{2})
  - Land: 2.50 sq mi (6.47 km^{2})
  - Water: 0.019 sq mi (0.05 km^{2})
- Elevation: 367 ft (112 m)
- Time zone: UTC-5 (Eastern (EST))
  - Summer (DST): UTC-4 (EDT)
- ZIP code: 27594
- Area codes: 252, 336
- GNIS feature ID: 997508

Wise is a small unincorporated community located on U.S. Route 1 in Warren County, North Carolina, United States. The nearest town is Norlina.

The Warren County Training School was listed on the National Register of Historic Places in 2006.
