= Rolesville, North Carolina =

- Town
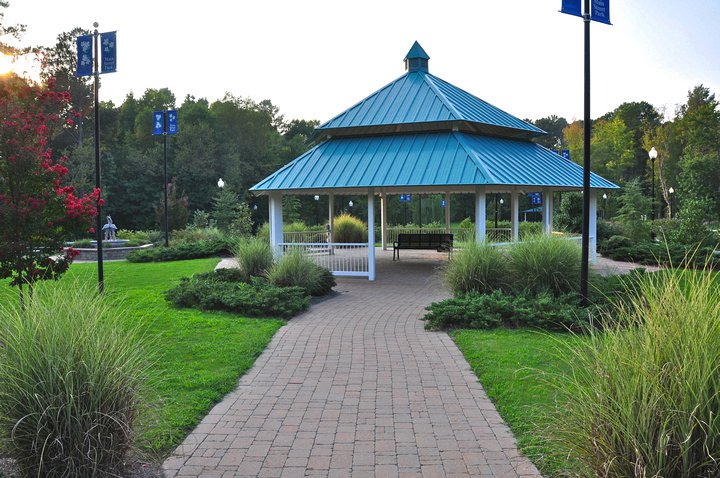
- Main Street Park

- Logo

- Location in Wake County and the state of North Carolina.
- Coordinates: 35°55′18″N 78°27′49″W
- Country: United States
- State: North Carolina
- County: Wake
- Incorporated: January 18, 1837
- Named for: William H. Roles

Government
  - Mayor: Ronnie I. Currin (R)

Area
  - Total: 6.12 sq mi (15.84 km^{2})
  - Land: 6.08 sq mi (15.74 km^{2})
  - Water: 0.039 sq mi (0.10 km^{2})
- Elevation: 410 ft (120 m)

Population (2020)
  - Total: 9,475
  - Density: 1,551.3/sq mi (598.97/km^{2})
- Time zone: UTC-5 (Eastern (EST))
  - Summer (DST): UTC-4 (EDT)
- ZIP code: 27571
- Area code: 919 984
- FIPS code: 37-57640
- GNIS feature ID: 2407237
- Website: rolesvillenc.gov

Rolesville is a town in northeastern Wake County, North Carolina, United States, a suburb of the capital city of Raleigh. It is the second oldest town in Wake County. The population was 9,475 at the 2020 census.

== History ==
In the beginning of the nineteenth century, William H. Roles, the namesake of the town, purchased land in the area and settled there. The town was chartered under his leadership in 1837 and became a stagecoach stop. About the same time, Rolesville Baptist Church was founded with Roles also playing a role. Rolesville Slave Auction Site Rolesville was incorporated on January 18, 1837, by the North Carolina Legislature.

== Geography ==
According to the United States Census Bureau the town has an area of 3.9 square miles (10.2 km^{2}), all land.

Rolesville is the namesake of the Rolesville diorite Batholith, also known as the Rolesville Pluton. While the batholith extends into regions north and south of Wake County, the bedrock formation is particularly visible in the form of rocky outcrops within the town limits and the immediate vicinity.

== Demographics ==
Historical population
Census	Pop.	Note	%±
1880	115		—
1890	150		30.4%
1900	155		3.3%
1910	170		9.7%
1950	288		—
1960	358		24.3%
1970	533		48.9%
1980	381		−28.5%
1990	572		50.1%
2000	907		58.6%
2010	3,786		317.4%
2020	9,475		150.3%
2025 (est.)	12,839	▲	35.5%
U.S. Decennial Census

=== 2020 census ===
Rolesville racial composition
Race	Number	Percentage
White (non-Hispanic)	5,743	60.61%
Black or African American (non-Hispanic)	2,096	22.12%
Native American	14	0.15%
Asian	327	3.45%
Pacific Islander	4	0.04%
Other/Mixed	455	4.8%
Hispanic or Latino	836	8.82%

As of the 2020 census, Rolesville had a population of 9,475. The median age was 37.3 years. 32.7% of residents were under the age of 18 and 10.5% of residents were 65 years of age or older. For every 100 females there were 94.6 males, and for every 100 females age 18 and over there were 88.1 males age 18 and over.

98.9% of residents lived in urban areas, while 1.1% lived in rural areas.

There were 2,978 households in Rolesville, of which 55.0% had children under the age of 18 living in them. Of all households, 72.1% were married-couple households, 7.3% were households with a male householder and no spouse or partner present, and 17.6% were households with a female householder and no spouse or partner present. About 12.5% of all households were made up of individuals and 6.2% had someone living alone who was 65 years of age or older.

There were 3,086 housing units, of which 3.5% were vacant. The homeowner vacancy rate was 1.8% and the rental vacancy rate was 4.4%.

== Parks and recreation ==
Parks include Main Street Park, Redford Place Park, Mill Bridge Nature Park, and Rolesville Community Center.

== Government ==
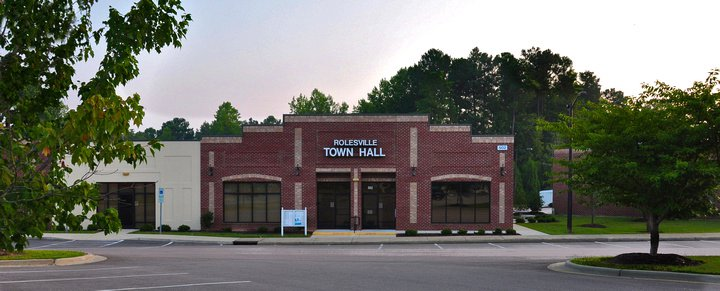
Rolesville Town Hall

Rolesville has an elected body composed of a mayor and five commissioners.

== Education ==
- Rolesville Elementary School
- Rolesville Middle School
- Rolesville High School
- Sanford Creek Elementary School
- Rolesville Charter Academy
- Thales Academy Junior High/High School - Rolesville

== Transportation ==
US 401

I-540

NC 98

US 401 Bus.

NC 96

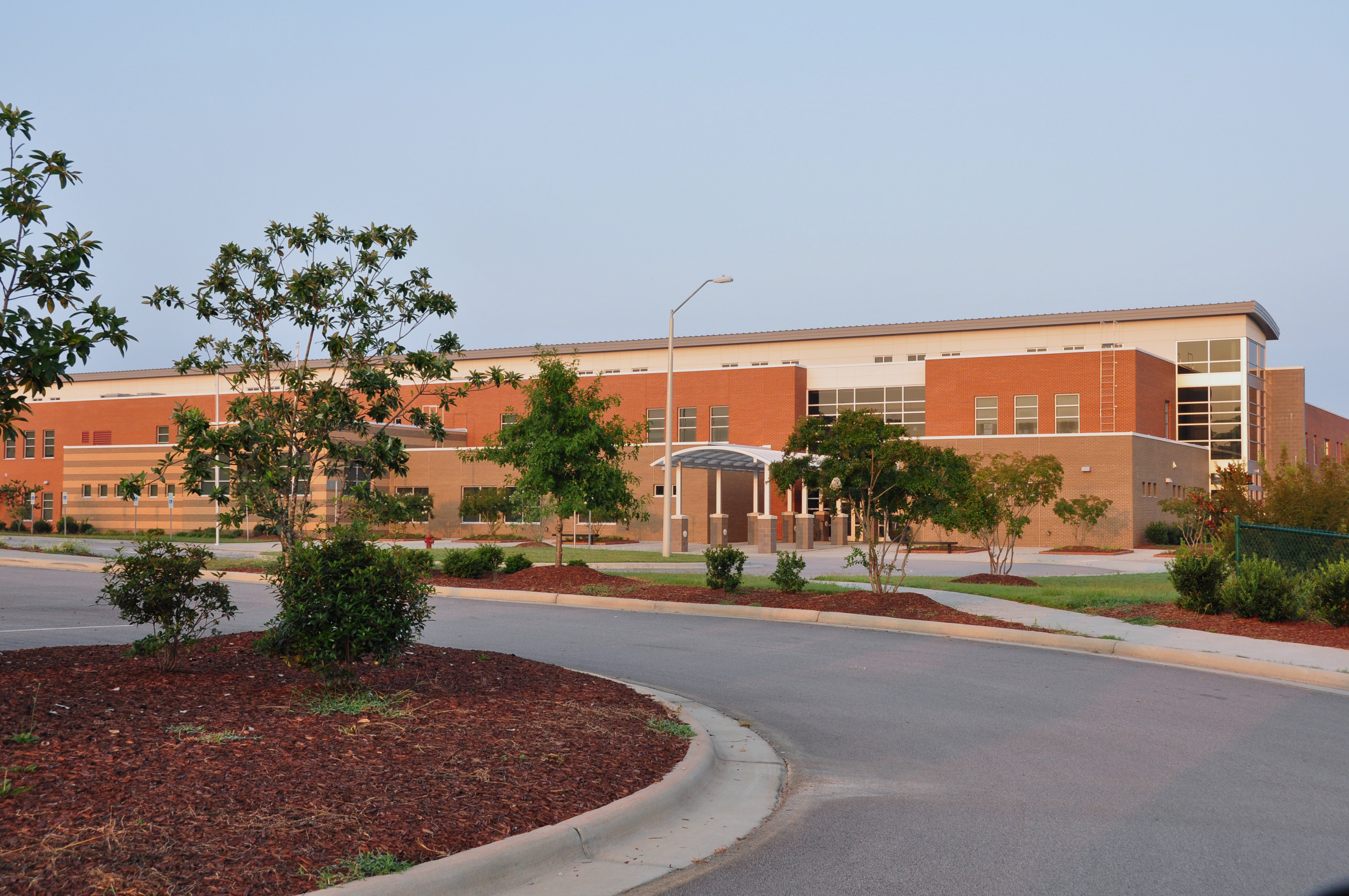
Sanford Creek Elementary

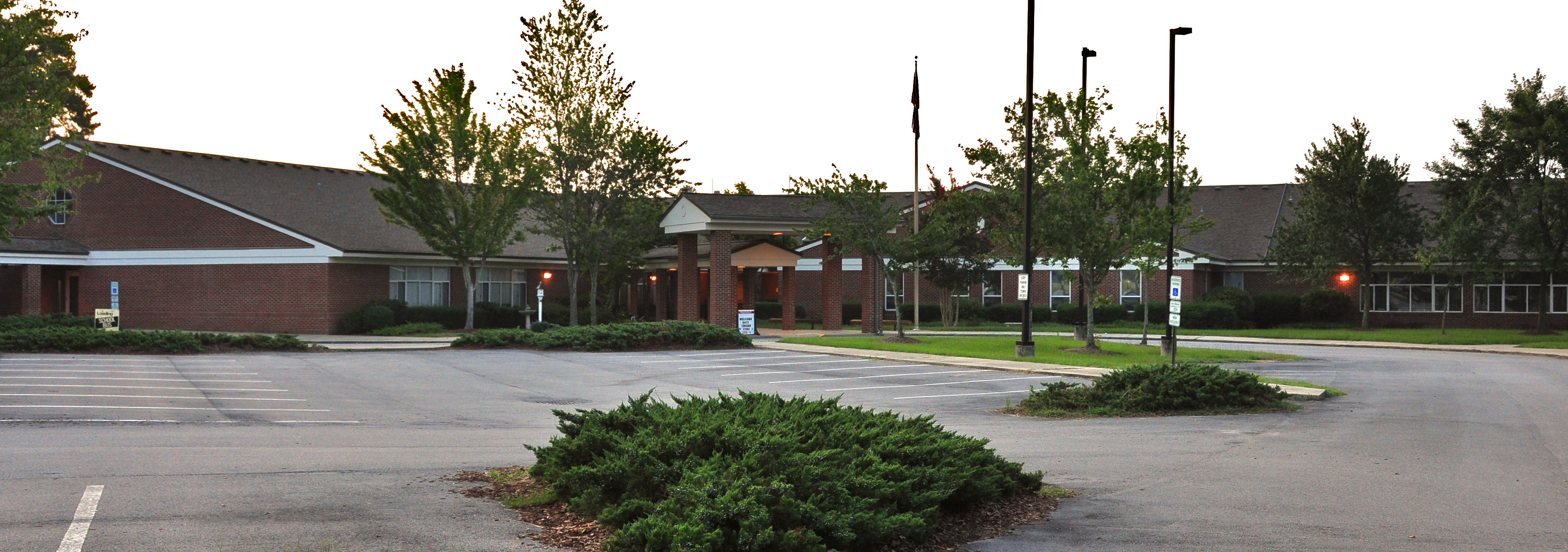
Rolesville Elementary School
