= Youngsville, North Carolina =

- Town
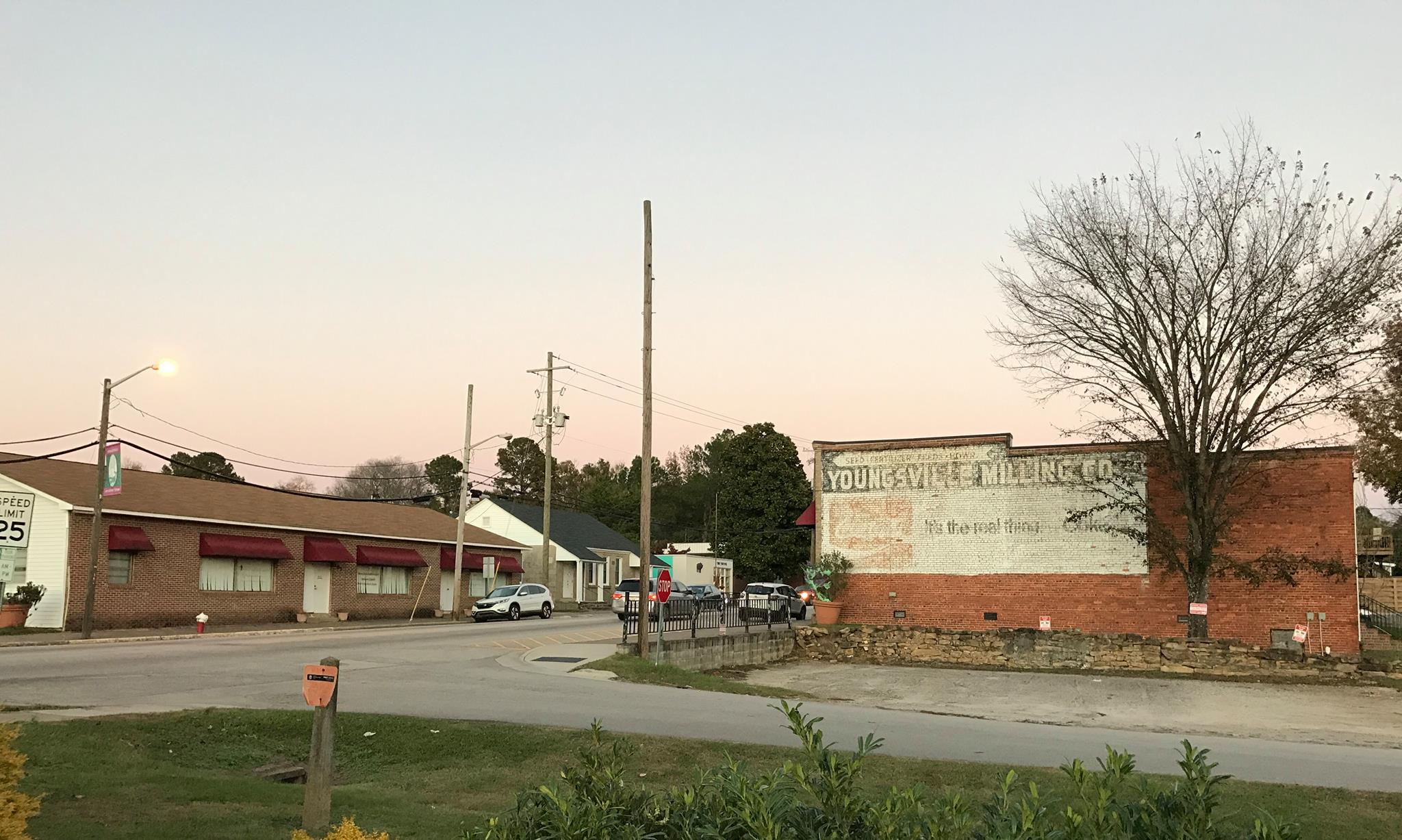

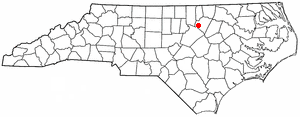
- Location of Youngsville, North Carolina
- Coordinates: 36°01′27″N 78°28′54″W
- Country: United States
- State: North Carolina
- County: Franklin
- Established: 1839
- Incorporated: March 17, 1875
- Named after: John "Jack" Young

Government
  - Type: Board of Commissioners
  - Mayor: Fonzie A. Flowers (R)

Area
  - Total: 1.86 sq mi (4.82 km^{2})
  - Land: 1.85 sq mi (4.80 km^{2})
  - Water: 0.0077 sq mi (0.02 km^{2})
- Elevation: 436 ft (133 m)

Population (2020)
  - Total: 2,016
  - Density: 1,088.2/sq mi (420.17/km^{2})
- Time zone: UTC-5 (Eastern (EST))
  - Summer (DST): UTC-4 (EDT)
- ZIP code: 27596
- Area codes: 919 and 984
- FIPS code: 37-76200
- GNIS feature ID: 2406927
- Website: http://townofyoungsville.org/

Youngsville is a town in Franklin County, North Carolina, United States. The population was 2,016 at the 2020 census.

== History ==
The settlement was originally established as Pacific around 1839 on land owned by John "Jack" Young. It was renamed Youngsville in his honor when the town was incorporated in 1875.

Notable area residents include country music singer Jason Michael Carroll.

William A. Jeffreys House was listed on the National Register of Historic Places in 1976.

== Geography ==
Youngsville is located near Raleigh. According to the United States Census Bureau, the town has a total area of 1.6 square miles (4.1 km^{2}), all land.

A railway operated by CSX Transportation currently passes through Youngsville, which is part of the old Seaboard Coast Line Railroad "S-Line".

== Demographics ==
Historical population
Census	Pop.	Note	%±
1880	117		—
1890	205		75.2%
1900	345		68.3%
1910	431		24.9%
1920	414		−3.9%
1930	395		−4.6%
1940	553		40.0%
1950	619		11.9%
1960	596		−3.7%
1970	555		−6.9%
1980	486		−12.4%
1990	424		−12.8%
2000	651		53.5%
2010	1,157		77.7%
2020	2,016		74.2%
U.S. Decennial Census

=== 2020 census ===
As of the 2020 census, Youngsville had a population of 2,016. The median age was 33.5 years. 25.0% of residents were under the age of 18 and 11.2% of residents were 65 years of age or older. For every 100 females there were 94.0 males, and for every 100 females age 18 and over there were 92.0 males age 18 and over.

98.4% of residents lived in urban areas, while 1.6% lived in rural areas.

There were 876 households in Youngsville, of which 37.0% had children under the age of 18 living in them. Of all households, 41.8% were married-couple households, 20.8% were households with a male householder and no spouse or partner present, and 30.3% were households with a female householder and no spouse or partner present. About 31.1% of all households were made up of individuals and 7.4% had someone living alone who was 65 years of age or older. There were 529 families residing in the town.

There were 903 housing units, of which 3.0% were vacant. The homeowner vacancy rate was 0.7% and the rental vacancy rate was 3.6%.

Youngsville racial composition
Race	Number	Percentage
White (non-Hispanic)	1,190	59.03%
Black or African American (non-Hispanic)	490	24.31%
Native American	7	0.35%
Asian	17	0.84%
Other/Mixed	120	5.95%
Hispanic or Latino	192	9.52%

=== 2010 census ===
As of the census of 2010, there were 1,157 people, 522 households, and 294 families residing in the town. The population density was 723.1 inhabitants per square mile (279.2/km^{2}). The racial makeup of the town was 69.3% White, 25.1% African American, 0.3% Native American, 0.8% Asian, 0.0% Pacific Islander, 2.9% from other races, and 1.6% from two or more races. Hispanic or Latino of any race were 4.8% of the population.

There were 522 households, out of which 28.9% had children under the age of 18 living with them, 35.8% were married couples living together, 15.5% had a female householder with no husband present, and 43.7% were non-families. 35.1% of all households were made up of individuals, and 7.0% had someone living alone who was 65 years of age or older. The average household size was 2.22 and the average family size was 2.89.

In the town, the population was distributed with 26.8% under the age of 20, 8.5% between 20 and 24, 31.8% from 25 to 44, 24.1% from 45 to 64, and 8.8% who were 65 years or older. The median age was 32.5 years. For every 100 females, there were 92.5 males. Among those 18 and older, there were 89.9 males for every 100 females.

The median income for a household in the town was $34,795, and the median income for a family was $43,250. Males had a median income of $32,500 versus $33,125 for females. The per capita income for the town was $21,927. About 8.2% of families and 9.3% of the population were below the poverty line, including 9.1% of those under age 18 and 2.9% of those age 65 or over.

=== Housing ===
There were 562 housing units at an average density of 351.3 per square mile (135.6/km^{2}). 7.1% of housing units were vacant.

There were 522 occupied housing units in the town. 203 were owner-occupied units (38.9%), while 319 were renter-occupied (61.1%). The homeowner vacancy rate was 7.7% of total units. The rental unit vacancy rate was 3.6%.

== Government ==
Youngsville is governed by a mayor and five-member Board of Commissioners, who are elected in staggered four-year terms.
