= List of breweries in North Carolina =

This article regards brewing in North Carolina.

== History ==
The earliest documented commercial brewery in North Carolina was in the Moravian town of Bethabara in Wachovia. According to the Moravian Diaries, a log house was constructed for a distillery and brewery in 1756. The May 1764 brewery and distillery inventory listed 270 gallons of brandy, 40 gallons of rye whisky, and 90 gallons of beer on hand. The Bethabara brewery and distillery continued operating until the last brewer moved away in 1814. The Bethabara brewery operated longer than the Single Brother's Brewery in nearby Salem, NC.

In 1985, Uli Bennewitz pushed a change in the North Carolina law books. This change made it legal for a brewpub to exist under state laws. The next year (1986) Bennewitz opened NC's first brewpub, Weeping Radish Bavarian Restaurant.

On August 13, 2005, House Bill 392 from the NC General Assembly was signed by then-Governor Mike Easley. HB 392 (commonly known as the "Pop The Cap" Bill) defined a "malt beverage" as any "beer, lager, malt liquor, ale, porter, and any other brewed or fermented beverage" that contained between .5% and 15% alcohol by volume. This represented an increase from the previous limit of 6%. As of 2021, there were more than 340 active breweries in North Carolina.

Western North Carolina breweries are transforming into gathering places for the community by offering a variety of entertainment, expanding amenities like playgrounds and dog parks, and hosting local social groups. This approach help brands build deeper local connections.

== List of breweries ==
Name	City	County	Opened	References
7 Sounds Brewing Company	Elizabeth City	Pasquotank	2022	
1718 Brewing Ocracoke	Ocracoke	Hyde	2017	
26 Acres Brewing Company	Concord	Cabarrus	2019	
Angry Elk Brewing	Whittier	Jackson	2022	
Angry Troll Brewing	Elkin	Yadkin	2016	
Appalachian Mountain Brewery	Boone (original); Mills River (2nd location)	Watauga; Henderson	2013 (original); 2023 (2nd location)	
Asheville Brewing Company	Asheville (3 locations)	Buncombe	1998 (original); 2006 (South Slope); 2012 (South Asheville)	
Ass Clown Brewing	Cornelius	Mecklenburg	2011	
Bearded Bee Brewing Company	Wendell	Wake	2020	
Beech Mountain Brewing Company	Beech Mountain	Avery	2014	
Bill's Brewing Company	Wilmington	New Hanover	2016 (original); 2024 (2nd location)	
Birdsong Brewing Company	Charlotte	Mecklenburg	2011	
Blackbird Brewery	Wake Forest	Wake	2022	
Black Creek Brewery	Roxboro	Person	2017	
Blowing Rock Brewing Company	Blowing Rock (2 locations); Hickory (3rd location)	Watauga; Catawba	2005 (original); 2013 (Ale House & Inn); 2018 (Hickory)	
Bond Brothers Beer Company	Cary (2 locations)	Wake	2016 (original); 2021 (Eastside)	
Boodas Brewing Company	Hendersonville	Henderson	2023	
Boojum Brewing Company	Waynesville	Haywood	2014	
Booneshine Brewing Company	Boone	Watauga	2012	
Brevard Brewing Company	Brevard	Transylvania	2012	
Bright Penny Brewing	Mebane (2 locations); Rocky Mount (3rd location)	Alamance; Nash	2017 (original); 2021 (Tanger Outlets); 2024 (Rocky Mount)	
Brown Truck Brewery	High Point	Guilford	2016	
Bryson City Brewing (Note: Originally Nantahala Brewing. Sold and rebranded to Bryson City Brewing in 2023.)	Bryson City	Swain	2023	
Buck Bald Brewing	Murphy	Cherokee	2018	
Burial Beer Company	Asheville (original); Raleigh; Charlotte	Buncombe; Wake; Mecklenburg	2013 (original); 2019 (Raleigh); 2022 (Charlotte)	
Carolina Brewery	Chapel Hill (original); Pittsboro (2nd location)	Orange; Chatham	1995 (original)	
Carolina Brewing Company	Holly Springs (original) Wendell (2nd location)	Wake	1995	
Club West Brewing (Note: Formerly Sycamore Brewing, re-branded to Club West in 2026.)	Charlotte	Mecklenburg	2013	
Currahee Brewing Company	Franklin	Macon	2016	
Dry Falls Brewing Company	Hendersonville	Henderson	2018	
Ecusta Brewing Company	Brevard	Transylvania	2016	
Floating Goat Brewing	Lexington	Davidson	2026	
Gizmo Brew Works	Raleigh (original); Chapel Hill (2nd location); Durham (3rd location)	Wake; Orange; Durham	2013(original); 2019 (Chapel-Hill); 2022 (Durham)	
Goose & Monkey Brewhouse	Lexington	Davidson	2020	
Grove Cartel Brewing Company	China Grove	Rowan	2021	
Guidon Brewing Company	Hendersonville	Henderson		2019
Green Man Brewery	Asheville	Buncombe	1997	
Gypsy Road Brewing Company	Kernersville	Forsyth	2018	
High-Wire Brewing	Asheville (original, 4 locations); Durham; Wilmington; Charlotte	Buncombe; Durham; New Hanover; Mecklenburg	2013 (original); 2015 (Biltmore Village); 2018 (Durham); 2020 (Wilmington); 2022 (Charlotte)	
Hoppy Trout Brewing Company	Andrews	Cherokee	2016	
Iron Key Brewing	Columbus	Polk	2020	
Lazy Hiker Brewing Company	Franklin; Sylva	Macon; Jackson	2015; 2019 (Sylvia)	
Lost Province Brewing Company	Boone	Watauga	2014	
Lynwood Brewing Concern	Raleigh	Wake	2013 (original); 2015 (2nd location)	
Mad Mole Brewing	Wilmington	New Hanover	2018	
Mother Earth Brewing	Kinston	Lenoir	2008	
Natty Greene's Brewing Company	Greensboro	Guilford	2004	
New Belgium Brewing Company	Asheville	Buncombe	2016	
New Sarum Brewing Company	Salisbury	Rowan	2016	
Noblebräu Brewing	Brevard	Transylvania	2020	
NoDa Brewing Company	Charlotte (3 locations)	Mecklenburg	2011 (original); 2015 (North End); 2018 (Airport pub)	
Oklawaha Brewing Company	Hendersonville	Henderson	2015	
Oskar Blues Brewery	Brevard	Transylvania	2012	
Petty Thieves Brewing Co.	Charlotte	Mecklenburg	2020	
Pinehurst Brewing Co.	Pinehurst	Moore	2018	
Ponysaurus Brewing	Durham (original); Wilmington (2nd location); Raleigh (3rd location)	Durham; New Hanover; Wake	2013 (original); 2022 (Wilmington); 2023 (Raleigh)	
Railhouse Brewery	Aberdeen	Moore	2010	
Railhouse Brewery-Penn Station	Southern Pines	Moore	2026	
Red Buffalo Brewing Company	Statesville	Iredell	2018	
Red Oak Brewery	Whitsett	Guilford	1991	
Sideways Farm and Brewing	Etowah	Henderson	2018	
Sierra Nevada Brewing Company	Mills River	Henderson	2012	
Snow Bird Brewery	Andrews	Cherokee	2019	
Southern Appalachian Brewing Company (Note: Formerly Appalachian Craft Brewery)	Hendersonville	Henderson	2003	
Top of the Hill Restaurant & Brewery	Chapel Hill	Orange	1996	
Town Brewing Company	Charlotte	Mecklenburg	2018	
Trailside Brewing Company	Hendersonville	Henderson	2023	
Valley River Brewing	Murphy	Cherokee	2015	
Weeping Radish Farm Brewery	Grandy	Currituck	1986	
Whiteside Brewing Company	Cashiers	Jackson	2018	
Wicked Weed Brewing	Asheville (original); Candler (2nd location)	Buncombe	2012 (Asheville); 2019 (Candler)	
Wiseman Brewing	Winston-Salem	Forsyth	2017	
Wrightsville Beach Brewery	Wilmington	New Hanover	2018	

=== List of closed breweries ===
Name	City	County	Opened	Closed	Notes	References
Avdet Brewing Company	Elizabeth City	Pasquotank	2022	2025		
Belleau Wood Brewing Company	Lillington	Harnett	2020			
Bright Light Brewing Company	Fayetteville	Cumberland	2017	2024		
Cotton House Craft Brewers	Cary	Wake	2018	2025		
Duck-Rabbit Craft Brewery	Farmville	Pitt	2004	2025		
Edward Teach Brewing	Wilmington	New Hanover	2017	2026		
Hatchet Brewing Company	Southern Pines	Moore	2019	2025		
Havoc Brewing Company	Pittsboro	Chatham	2023	2025		
Heinzelmannchen Brewery	Sylva	Jackson	2004	2017		
Kernersville Brewing Company	Kernersville	Forsyth	2018	2024	Acquired by Little Brother Brewing	
Nantahala Brewing Company	Bryson City	Swain	2009	2023	Sold and rebranded as Bryson City Brewing.	
Paddled South Brewing Company	High Point	Guilford	2021	2025		
Red Moose Brewing Company	Pittsboro	Chatham	2021	2025		
Vicious Fishes Brewery	Angier (original); Fuquay-Varina (2nd location); Apex (3rd location); Cary (4th location)	Harnett; Wake	2023 (Cary)	2025 (Angier, Fuquay-Varina); 2026 (Apex, Cary)		

== See also ==
- Beer in the United States
- List of breweries in the United States
- List of microbreweries
