= Eagle Rock, North Carolina =

Unincorporated community in North Carolina, US

Coordinates: 35°47′29″N 78°24′30″W

Eagle Rock is an unincorporated community in Wake County, North Carolina, United States. It is located at 35°47'28N 78°24'31W, and is approximately 4 miles (6.4 km) east of Knightdale, and 2.25 miles (3.62 km) northwest of Wendell, just to the southeast of the interchange of US 64 and US 64-Business. Southeastern Free Will Baptist College lies within the community. The Hood–Anderson Farm is located in Eagle Rock and is listed on the National Register of Historic Places.
