= Josh Grizzard =

American football player and coach (born 1990)

Philadelphia Eagles
- Title: Pass game coordinator

Personal information
- Born: June 11, 1990 (age 36); Lizard Lick, North Carolina, U.S.
- Listed height: 6 ft 3 in (1.91 m)
- Listed weight: 196 lb (89 kg)

Career information
- Position: Safety
- High school: East Wake (NC)
- College: Yale (2008–2011)

Career history
- Carolina Panthers (2012) Team operations intern; Yale (2012) Student assistant; Duke (2013–2016) Graduate assistant & quality control coach; Miami Dolphins (2017–2023); Offensive quality control coach (2017-2018); Quality control coach (2019); Wide receivers coach (2020-2021); Offensive quality control coach (2022-2023); Tampa Bay Buccaneers (2024–2025); Pass game coordinator (2024); Offensive coordinator (2025); Philadelphia Eagles (2026–present) Pass game coordinator
- Coaching profile at Pro Football Reference

Joshua G. Grizzard (born June 11, 1990) is an American professional football coach who is the pass game coordinator for the Philadelphia Eagles of the National Football League (NFL). He previously served as the offensive coordinator for the Buccaneers in the 2025 season. Before that, Grizzard served as an assistant coach for the Miami Dolphins, as well as at Duke University and Yale University.

== Early life ==
A native of Lizard Lick, North Carolina, Grizzard was a two-sport athlete at East Wake High School, where he played basketball and football. A two-way player who played quarterback and safety, he was the football team's MVP and his class's valedictorian, graduating with a 4.75 GPA.

== Playing career ==
Grizzard played college football at Yale from 2008 to 2011 before opting to switch to a student coaching position. He was originally recruited by Tony Reno, who was both the defensive backs coach and assistant head coach at the time. Grizzard was forced to redshirt his freshman season at Yale after reaggravating an ACL injury. Following Yale's 10–0 loss to rival Harvard to close the 2008 season, head coach Jack Siedlecki resigned amid growing criticism, which also resulted in the departure of the staff, including Reno. Grizzard played for Yale under new coach Tom Williams for his redshirt freshman, sophomore, and junior seasons.

== Coaching career ==
=== Early career ===
Following the 2011 season, Grizzard served as a Team Operations Intern with the Carolina Panthers during their pre-season training camp prior to the 2012 season.

When Yale head coach Tom Williams stepped down from following the 2011 season, Yale hired Tony Reno – who had spent the 2009–2011 seasons as the defensive backs and special teams coach for Harvard and had originally recruited Grizzard to Yale in 2008 – as their new head coach. Having recognized his interest in coaching, Grizzard opted to work as a student assistant coach for defensive coordinator Rick Flanders rather than play for his redshirt senior season in 2012. Grizzard graduated following that season, in December 2012, with a bachelor's degree in political science.

Following his graduation from Yale, Grizzard coached at Duke from 2013 to 2016 as a graduate assistant/quality control coach, working with the Blue Devil quarterbacks. While at Duke, Grizzard earned a master's degree in Christian studies.

=== Miami Dolphins ===
During his time with the Dolphins, Grizzard served as a quality control coach (2017–19, 2022–23) and wide receivers coach (2020–21). Grizzard was a part of four consecutive winning seasons with the Dolphins, which accomplished the feat for the first time since the club did so in seven straight seasons from 1997 through 2003.

Grizzard contributed to an offense that finished the 2023 season ranked first in yards per game (401.3), passing yards per game (265.5), and yards per carry (5.1), while ranking second in yards per play (6.5), net yards per pass attempt (8.0), and points scored per game (29.2). During his time as Miami's wide receivers coach, Grizzard worked closely with Jaylen Waddle, who in 2021 broke both the NFL's then-record for most rookie receptions with 104 and the current Dolphins club rookie record of 1,015 receiving yards.

=== Tampa Bay Buccaneers ===
On February 23, 2024, Grizzard was hired by the Tampa Bay Buccaneers as their pass game coordinator under head coach Todd Bowles. On January 31, 2025, Grizzard was promoted to offensive coordinator, replacing Liam Coen, after his departure to become head coach of the Jacksonville Jaguars. On January 8, 2026, the Buccaneers fired Grizzard.

=== Philadelphia Eagles ===
On January 30, 2026, Grizzard was hired by the Philadelphia Eagles as their pass game coordinator under head coach Nick Sirianni.
