= List of Lizard Lick Towing episodes =

Lizard Lick Towing is an improvised American reality television series. It is filmed in the style of cinéma vérité, and the network behind the show, truTV, state that their series "feature real-life situations," unlike other reality shows "which often involve contests or other highly staged events." The show is a spin-off of the truTV series All Worked Up, and follows Ron Shirley, his wife Amy, Bobby Brantley, and their team of repossession agents in Wendell, North Carolina (the town that has jurisdiction over the Lizard Lick unincorporated area).

As of August 18, 2014, 91 episodes of Lizard Lick Towing have aired, the most recent season ending in late 2014.

== Series overview ==
Season	Episodes	Originally aired	
Season	Episodes	Season premiere	Season finale
1	12	February 7, 2011	October 10, 2011
2	26	December 5, 2011	September 3, 2012
3	26	January 21, 2013	September 30, 2013
4	27	December 16, 2013	August 18, 2014

== Episodes ==
=== Season 1 (2011) ===
No. overall	No. in season	Title	Original release date
1	1	"Episode 101"	February 7, 2011
A dangerous tattooed man's car is targeted for repossession in the premiere of this series following a repo business in Lizard Lick, North Carolina.
2	2	"Episode 102"	February 14, 2011
Ron & Bobby must repossess a car from a guy who opens fire on them. Amy takes to the streets to retrieve a cable van. Ron's dog is taken by an angry repossessee.
3	3	"Episode 103"	February 21, 2011
Amy punches a debtor who demands the return of his truck. Ron is late for his date with Amy due to a late evening repo.
4	4	"Episode 104"	February 28, 2011
Ronnie and Bobby are attacked by a car owner throwing explosives at them.
5	5	"Episode 105"	March 7, 2011
Ron and Bobby head to a stock car track to repossess a flatbed and truck from a racecar driver.
6	6	"Episode 106"	March 14, 2011
Ron and Amy host a pig roast, and while at the party, Bobby spots a car up for repo. The guys go to Miami to repo a boat. Amy confronts a man in the office with just a few days left till her due date for the baby. Amy's waters break and she is rushed to hospital, Ron has to rush back from Miami with Bobby. Ron arrives just in time and helps Amy give birth to their daughter, Maggie Mae Shirley.
7	7	"Episode 107"	August 22, 2011
Ron and Bobby repo a tricked-out truck from a wannabe military man. Then, back at the office, Ron and Amy grow annoyed as Bobby becomes distracted by his personal life. Finally, a repo gone bad in a rough part of town sends Ron to the ER.
8	8	"Episode 108"	August 29, 2011
Tensions rise as Bobby denies involvement with his ex. The team goes after landscapers who haven't paid for their fancy lawn mowers. Ron and Bobby get a car that is held hostage. Ron and Amy find a surprise that could change Lizard Lick.
9	9	"Episode 109"	September 5, 2011
Tensions are high between Bobby and Amy after their confrontation at the diner. Ron puts Bobby in a sticky situation at a motel when the boys set up a sting on a sexy escort. Amy finds an interesting video in Ron's inbox.
10	10	"Episode 110"	September 12, 2011
The boys get caught up in a dangerous situation when they head out to the boonies to repo a truck from a bunch of moonshiners. Ron throws Bobby a party in his honor, but a surprise guest puts a kink in Ron's plans.
11	11	"Episode 111"	September 26, 2011
Tensions rise as Ron gives Bobby an ultimatum that could change Lizard Lick Towing forever. A lien holder brings unsettling news as rumors swirl around Lizard Lick. A surprise guest throws a wrench in Ron's plan to mend his family ties.
12	12	"Episode 112"	October 10, 2011
On this exciting season finale, Ron tells Bobby he has to choose between his family at The Lick and his ex. After the repo of an arsenal of yard equipment, Bobby and Ron have a confrontation that will change Lizard Lick Towing forever.

=== Season 2 (2011–12) ===
No. overall	No. in season	Title	Original release date
13	1	"Episode 201"	December 5, 2011
A new chapter begins in the Lizard Lick saga as Ron recovers from his stabbing. With Ron not up to full strength, he and Amy enlist some new help, When a surprise visitor arrives, the fate of Lizard Lick Towing hangs in the balance.
14	2	"Episode 202"	December 12, 2011
Tensions rise when Ron is forced to go on some jobs with Bobby, They head out to repo a tractor from a group of enraged farmers. Later, they go after a car that is under the protection of a fight promoter and his violence-prone bodyguard.
15	3	"Episode 203"	December 19, 2011
As bills pile up, Ron and Bobby must take on high-risk repos. Bobby is set on revenge when his childhood bully's car comes up for repo. Ron gets a visit from his fuel distributor, who urges Ron to pay the bill or risk losing him as a source.
16	4	"Episode 204"	December 26, 2011
Tensions rise when Ron defies Amy and listens to Bobby's big plan to get them out of debt. Ron and Bobby go on a high-stakes repo that leaves Bobby in a compromising situation. Bobby's kind heart leads him to repo more than just a car.
17	5	"Episode 205"	January 5, 2012
Dwight sets the stakes for the New Orleans trip as Ron and Bobby scramble to tie up loose ends around the office. Ron and Bobby enlist the help of Big Juicy for a tricky repo. A traumatic accident leaves Ron and Bobby's trip in jeopardy.
18	6	"Episode 206"	January 9, 2012
Tensions mount as Ron’s knee injury puts a kink in their plans to go to New Orleans. Ron, Bobby and Amy work together on a tricky motorcycle repo, and a van repo turns violent when a surprise rolls into Ron and Bobby’s lap.
19	7	"Episode 207"	January 16, 2012
Ron and Bobby's trip to the Big Easy starts off with a bang. When they are sent to repo a fan boat, they end up on the wrong end of rifle-wielding swamp people. Amy's suspicions about Dwight lead her to make a crucial decision.
20	8	"Episode 208"	January 23, 2012
Lizard Lick Towing's jobs in New Orleans get even stranger. The boys go to an abandoned warehouse to repo a semi trailer from a family of eccentrics, and Amy assists on a job to repo a hearse from unscrupulous gangbangers.
21	9	"Episode 209"	February 6, 2012
After a disastrous end to their New Orleans trip, Ron and Bobby battle over how to deal with Dwight. The boys head to Make-Out Point to repo a car, and Bobby suffers a devastating setback that puts the future of the business in jeopardy.
22	10	"Episode 210"	February 20, 2012
With Bobby's truck up in flames, he's out for revenge, and it's up to Ron to hold The Lick together. Ron and Bobby head to a den of criminals to repo a vehicle, and a huge job lands in the boys' lap: 25 cars in three hours for 30 grand.
23	11	"Episode 211"	February 27, 2012
Ron heads to Bobby's house to drag him out of bed for a potentially nasty repo. With Ron and Bobby still trying to get out from under Dwight's shadow, they get called out on a repo that could end with someone in the back of a police car.
24	12	"Episode 212"	March 5, 2012
Ron faces his first day out of jail with new resolve to atone for his past sins. Bobby and Ron head to the backwoods to repossess some tricked-out rims, and the Lizard Lick office gets buried under its toughest challenge yet.
25	13	"Episode 213"	March 19, 2012
As Ron and Amy make plans to renew their wedding vows, Bobby plans a wild bachelor party. A sneaky debtor leads Ron and Bobby on a wild goose chase. Bobby comes across a repo that could cause him to miss Ron and Amy's big day.
26	14	"Episode 214"	June 11, 2012
A new chapter begins in the Lizard Lick saga! Ron and Bobby get attacked by a group of angry biker women. Then, their plans get bulldozed when the angry owner of a steamroller comes around looking for revenge. And a mysterious man from the past reappears with an offer that Ronnie can't refuse... much to Amy's dismay.
27	15	"Episode 215"	June 18, 2012
Tensions rise at the Lick as Ron's old friend Johnny pushes a wedge between the Lizard Lick crew. First, when the boys go to repossess a sedan from a crazed karate expert, Bobby takes a hit that could put him down for good. Then, a repo at a chicken farm leaves Ron with egg on his face. And finally, the repo crew pushes Ron to make a drastic decision that will change the face of Lizard Lick Towing.
28	16	"Episode 216"	June 25, 2012
Ron decides to bring his ex-con cousin, Johnny, onto the Lizard Lick team and ignites a massive firefight with Amy and Bobby.
29	17	"Episode 217"	July 2, 2012
While Johnny puts the moves on Amy, Ron and Bobby get caught up in a civil war reenactment.? First, Johnny's indecent proposal sends Amy into a frenzy to find Ronnie.? Then, Ron and Bobby enlist Krazy Dave's help with a special recovery-200 feet straight down... and finally, it's the day of reckoning for Johnny when Ron discovers he's been betrayed by a kissing cousin!
30	18	"Episode 218"	July 9, 2012
Ronnie plans a big team outing to the beach for some greatly needed R & R. But first, Ron and Bobby get caught in an old fashioned barn burner that leaves them running for the exits!? When the gang lands on the shore, they wind-up face-to-face with an angry mob... and Krazy Dave gets tossed by giant, rogue wave — and more than his pride gets swept away...
31	19	"Episode 219"	July 16, 2012
Ron's bad bet turns the tables and makes Bobby his boss! The first repo stinks-- and lands Ron into the dumps. Later, Ron and Bobby battle a band of crazed mountain folk that has them yelling, "Run from the hills!"
32	20	"Episode 220"	July 23, 2012
Bobby is flying on cloud nine until an airplane repo leaves him gasping for air. First, after winning Lizard Lick in a bet, Bobby makes some drastic changes to the office that leaves Ron and Amy with no other choice but to plot their revenge. Then, Ron and Bobby enlist Amy's help in repoing the country super star Colt Ford's tour bus. And finally, the tables have turned when Bobby realizes that being the boss isn't always all that it's cracked up to be.
33	21	"Episode 221"	July 30, 2012
Ron and Bobby grind Amy's gears when they leave her home alone for some fun at a classic car show — but the boy's day hits a road bump when Ron and Bobby spot a vintage MG sports car that's up for repo. Then, Ron sends Amy on a wild goose chase that leads her to a former fight rival who is itching for a rematch — right in the streets of Raleigh!
34	22	"Episode 222"	August 6, 2012
A pet shop repo has Bobby scaling the walls... while Amy's intense MMA fight training has her absent at work and threatens the marriage.
35	23	"Episode 223"	August 13, 2012
Ron and Bobby go for a "Hail Mary" when a football coach has his truck repossessed — but not before Ron gets stuck sleeping on the couch when he refuses to support Amy in her upcoming MMA brawl.
36	24	"Episode 224"	August 20, 2012
With the help of veteran NASCAR driver Elliott Sadler, Ron, Bobby and Amy play a prank on rookie racer, Austin Dillon-but not until a mysterious man starts stealing business from the Lizard Lick crew.
37	25	"Episode 225"	August 27, 2012
A big shot offers to buy Lizard Lick Towing — but when Ron refuses the proposition, the mysterious money man wages an all-out war on the Lick Crew!
38	26	"Episode 226"	September 3, 2012
Repo Ron is about to either make the biggest jackpot of his life — or the biggest mistake of his life — when a hyper aggressive competitor makes an offer to buy Lizard Lick.

=== Season 3 (2013) ===
No. overall	No. in season	Title	Original release date	U.S. viewers (millions)
39	1	"Episode 301"	January 21, 2013	2.88
Ron deals with the aftermath of his hasty decision to sell Lizard Lick Towing: the new owner threatens to put the whole crew out of a job. But before the deal is done, Ron and Bobby go after one final repo — an expensive sports car abandoned on train tracks that leaves Ron and Bobby in the path of an oncoming train.
40	2	"Episode 302"	January 28, 2013	2.63
The fate of Lizard Lick Towing is finally revealed! Can Ron Shirley find a legal loophole to hang onto his beloved business... or will Lars Dixon become the new owner and toss the Lizard Lick crew onto the street and into the unemployment line?
41	3	"Episode 303"	February 4, 2013	2.12
Ron and Bobby are about to embark in their new careers as security guards for a mystery celebrity -- but before they get started, the boys are forced to repo a charter bus filled with senior citizens on a gambling trip.
42	4	"Episode 304"	February 11, 2013	2.00
Before Ron and Bobby can start their very first security detail protecting Wrestling Superstar Ric Flair at a charity event, the boys are forced into a deadly game of chicken at a BMX bike race track.
43	5	"Episode 305"	February 18, 2013	2.09
Bobby has big plans to get into the restaurant business when a food truck goes on the auction block — but will Ron and Amy jump on board as partners? Then, Ron and Bobby try to lure reluctant debtors out of a locked car with a BBQ cook-off!
44	6	"Episode 306"	February 25, 2013	1.97
Krazy Dave's family reunion threatens to ruin the debut of Ron and Bobby's Food Truck.
45	7	"Episode 307"	March 4, 2013	2.25
A dangerous six-car repo mobilizes the entire crew. but not before the grand opening of Lizard Lick's new BBQ venture is canceled when Ron and Bobby's food truck gets stolen from Krazy Dave.
46	8	"Episode 308"	March 11, 2013	2.20
Ron and Bobby repo a vehicle at a rodeo. Krazy Dave and Amy arrange a blind date for Bobby.
47	9	"Episode 309"	March 18, 2013	1.87
Ron recalls his old dog, Repo. Meanwhile Bobby has to repossess a van from a beauty pageant. Bobby's date with Cassie is jeopardized by Ron.
48	10	"Episode 310"	March 25, 2013	2.28
Krazy Dave has a racy encounter during a repo. Amy jeopardizes her friendship with Bobby by meddling in his love life.
49	11	"Episode 311"	April 1, 2013	2.15
Ron helps a farmer facing foreclosure on his property. Bobby fulfills a lifelong dream.
50	12	"Episode 312"	April 15, 2013	1.85
An old enemy from his past attempts to sabotage Ron's mayoral campaign.
51	13	"Episode 313"	April 22, 2013	2.40
Ron's opponent in the mayoral race accuses him of misconduct. A mishap during a repo has consequences for the team.
52	14	"Episode 314"	July 8, 2013	2.42
Bobby is rushed to the hospital after a bad car accident; Ron and Amy await news on his condition.
53	15	"Episode 315"	July 15, 2013	1.82
Cassie reveals a secret to Bobby. Ron's Cousin Johnny botches a repo.
54	16	"Episode 316"	July 22, 2013	2.22
Ron ends up injured and arrested during a repo. Meanwhile, Cassie attempts an insurance scam.
55	17	"Episode 317"	July 29, 2013	2.05
The mayor of Lizard Lick accuses Bobby of theft, prompting Amy to try to prove his innocence.
56	18	"Episode 318"	August 5, 2013	1.43
Bobby contuinues to recover from his injuries. Ron is forced to use Krazy Dave on a repo during a turkey hunt.
57	19	"Episode 319"	August 12, 2013	1.83
Bobby finds a compromising photo of Cassie with another man.
58	20	"Episode 320"	August 19, 2013	2.28
Bobby confronts Cassie about seeing her ex-husband. Meanwhile, Ron suspects another man is interested in Amy.
59	21	"Episode 321"	August 26, 2013	2.04
Ron and Bobby are forced to perform a repo on a volatile (and illegal) bounty hunter.
60	22	"Episode 322"	September 2, 2013	1.89
Amy tries to gather evidence of wrongdoing against incumbent Sam Davis, Ron's rival in the mayoral race.
61	23	"Episode 323"	September 9, 2013	1.77
Bobby confronts the man who burglarized his home. Krazy Dave attempts to repossess an 18-wheeler on his own.
62	24	"Episode 324"	September 16, 2013	1.38
Bobby takes charge of the business while Ron takes Amy on a second honeymoon.
63	25	"Episode 325"	September 23, 2013	1.28
Amy is unimpressed with Ron's efforts at a second honeymoon. Bobby struggles with taking care of the business.
64	26	"Episode 326"	September 30, 2013	1.54
Amy and Ron grapple with each other for control of the business. A member of the team goes missing during a repo.

=== Season 4 (2013–14) ===
No. overall	No. in season	Title	Original release date	U.S. viewers (millions)
65	1	"Episode 401"	December 16, 2013	1.32
Ron and Amy's repo competition takes a turn when Amy goes missing. Bobby has to go before a judge to face felony charges.
66	2	"Episode 402"	December 23, 2013	1.38
One of the Shirleys' children goes missing while roaming the woods searching for a Christmas tree. Bobby plays Santa to a needy family.
67	3	"Episode 403"	December 30, 2013	1.53
Ron, Amy and Bobby attend an 80's-themed party, where Bobby faces people from his past.
68	4	"Episode 404"	January 6, 2014	1.31
The Lizard Lick crew rally to help a struggling single mother. Bobby hurts Big Juicy's feelings.
69	5	"Episode 405"	January 13, 2014	1.48
The Lizard Lick crew offer a life-changing surprise to a homeless mother and her kids.
70	6	"Episode 406"	January 20, 2014	1.42
While on a date, Bobby is forced to confront a female stalker.
71	7	"Episode 407"	January 27, 2014	1.62
Bobby makes changes to the office after tackling an airplane repo. The crew must repo a tour bus from a country singer.
72	8	"Episode 408"	February 3, 2014	1.61
Ron and Bobby attend a classic car show and find an MG sports that's up for repo. Amy, left on her own, gets into a fight.
73	9	"Episode 409"	February 17, 2014	1.17
Ron and Amy deal with a theft from the Lizard Lick tow lot, and the clues seem to suggest Big Juicy is the culprit.
74	10	"Episode 410"	February 24, 2014	1.18
Ron and Amy discover the true culprit behind the theft from the tow lot.
75	11	"Episode 414"	March 3, 2014	1.10
A special edition as Ron, Amy and Bobby take viewers on a tour of their hometown and their favorite hangouts and meaningful places.
76	12	"Episode 411"	March 10, 2014	1.13
Big Juicy risks losing her job when a repossessed car is stolen while under her watch; she tries to find the culprit.
77	13	"Episode 412"	March 24, 2014	1.02
Lizard Lick Towing is on the brink of bankruptcy when Ron's dad breaks off his support. Bobby is tempted with an opportunity apart from Ron and Amy.
78	14	"Episode 413"	March 31, 2014	0.84
Bobby's new opportunity, the chance at his own towing business, leads to an angry confrontation with Ron.
79	15	"Episode 415"	May 26, 2014	1.26
Ronnie is heartbroken when Bobby leaves Lizard Lick to start his own towing company.
80	16	"Episode 416"	June 2, 2014	1.27
Amy comes to the rescue of Krazy Dave and Juicy when they bungle a repo, and Ron secretly lends a hand to Bobby's new business when Cassie fails to deliver the start-up cash.
81	17	"Episode 417"	June 9, 2014	1.37
In a desperate move, Cassie turns to Ron for bailout money for Bobby's new business.
82	18	"Episode 418"	June 16, 2014	1.21
Cassie pressures Bobby to move in with her, and cousin Johnny blows a big repo while Ronnie recuperates from his beat down.
83	19	"Episode 419"	June 23, 2014	1.52
Bobby plans to repo a Chevy Suburban from the gang who beat up Ronnie, Juicy starts her modeling career.
84	20	"Episode 420"	June 30, 2014	1.26
Ronnie comes to the rescue during a fiery repo, while things really heat up between Juicy and Earl.
85	21	"Episode 421"	July 7, 2014	1.15
Bobby ponders selling his new business to rejoin the Lizard Lick crew, and Ron's father, "Pops," asks Bobby to help him on a giant repo job that can land everyone in a ton of dough.
86	22	"Episode 422"	July 14, 2014	1.20
Ronnie allows Bobby to rejoin the Lizard Lick crew on a few strange conditions, and Krazy Dave receives some heartbreaking news on his marriage.
87	23	"Episode 423"	July 21, 2014	1.37
Ronnie sets a trap to uncover the identity of a stalker; Bobby and Johnny take a wild ride.
88	24	"Episode 424"	July 28, 2014	1.44
Ronnie uncovers the identity of the thief at Lizard Lick.
89	25	"Episode 425"	August 4, 2014	1.39
90	26	"Episode 426"	August 11, 2014	1.09
91	27	"Episode 427"	August 18, 2014	1.45
