= Top of the Hill =

Top of the Hill may refer to:

- Top of the Hill (TV series), an American political drama television series
- Top of the Hill (film), a 1980 American television film
- Top of the Hill bar shooting, a 1972 mass shooting in Derry, Northern Ireland
- Top of the Hill Restaurant & Brewery, Chapel Hill, North Carolina
- Top of the Hill, a song by John Mayall & the Bluesbreakers, from the album A Hard Road
