= Harmony Plantation =

Historic house in North Carolina, United States

- U.S. National Register of Historic Places
- Location within North Carolina Location within the United States
- Location: 5104 Riley Hill Rd., near Wendell, North Carolina
- Coordinates: 35°51′54″N 78°26′38″W
- Area: 15 acres (6.1 ha)
- Built: 1833
- Architectural style: Greek Revival
- MPS: Wake County MPS
- NRHP reference No.: 07001504
- Added to NRHP: January 29, 2008

The Harmony Plantation, also known as Montague-Jones Farm, is a historic plantation house located at 5104 Riley Hill Road near Wendell, North Carolina, a town in eastern Wake County. It was built in 1833, and is a two-story, three-bay, single-pile, Greek Revival style frame dwelling. It is sheathed in weatherboard, has a hipped roof, and a gabled rear ell. The front facade features a centered, double-tier pedimented, front-gabled portico with bracketed cornice and unfluted Doric order columns. Also on the property is a contributing one-story, rectangular, beaded weatherboard building that once housed a doctor's office (1833).

The plantation was the home of Dr. Henry W. Montague, his wife Anne Jones Montague and as many as 46 people who they enslaved people and forced to work the farm.

In January 2008, the Harmony Plantation was listed on the National Register of Historic Places.

== See also ==
- List of Registered Historic Places in North Carolina
