= Asheville Brewing Company =

American brewery

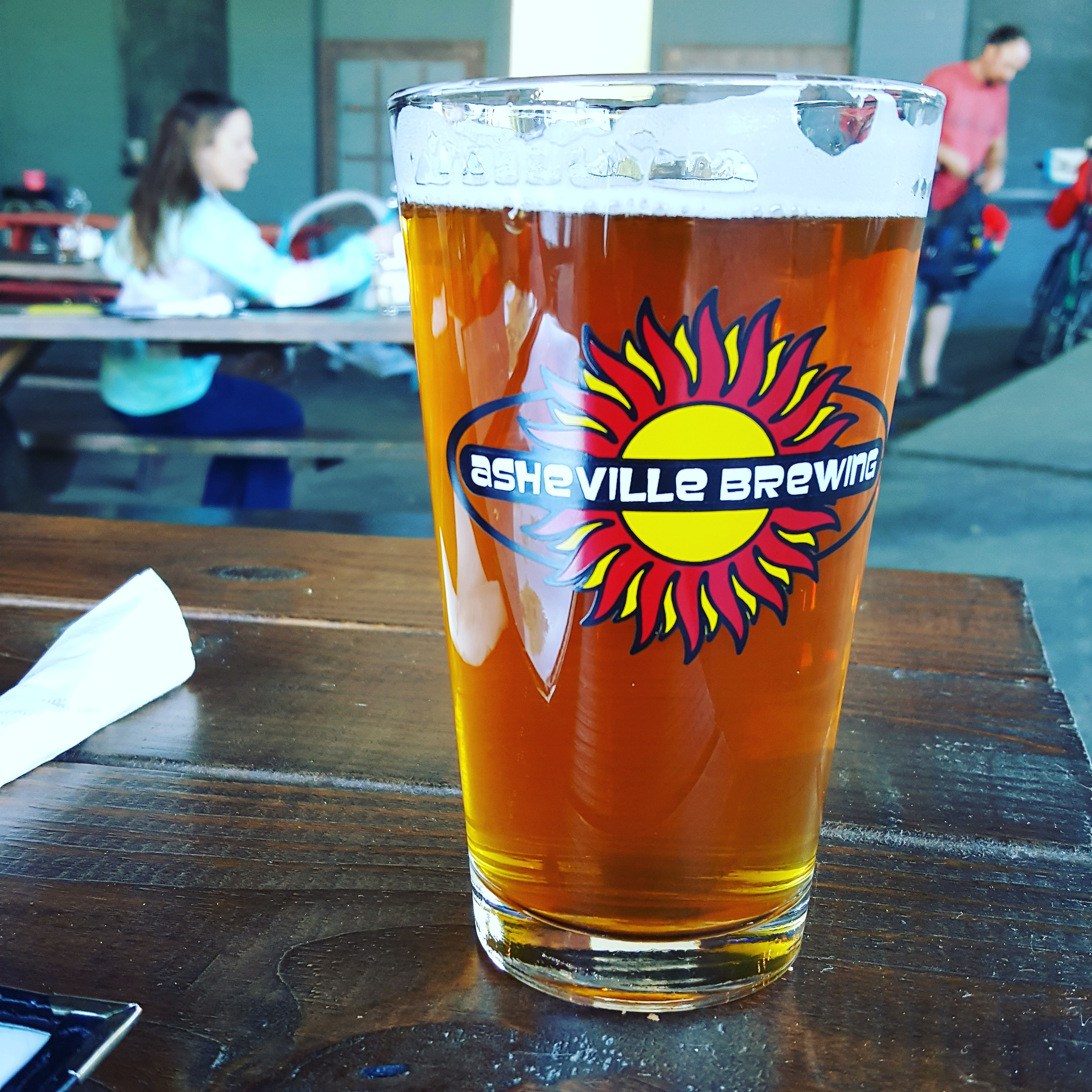
Pint at Asheville Brewing Company

Asheville Brewing Company is a craft brewery in Asheville, North Carolina.

== History ==
One of a plethora of breweries on the "south slope" of the city, the company was Asheville's third brewery, after Highland Brewing and Green Man.

Until a move in 2015, it was western North Carolina's oldest continuously operated brewery.

As of 2014, the brewery had plans to produce up to 13,000 barrels of beer per year.
