= Gizmo Brew Works =

Microbrewery in Raleigh, North Carolina

- Industry: Alcoholic beverage
- Founded: 2013
- Headquarters: Raleigh, North Carolina, United States
- Products: Beer
- Website: gizmobrewworks.com

Gizmo Brew Works is a microbrewery in Raleigh, NC. Gizmo was established in 2013 when the brewery that previously operated in that location went out of business and was bought out by former customers. Since then, Gizmo has become a part of the Raleigh foodie scene, participating in local events like Hickory Hops and Brewgaloo as well as regularly hosting independent food trucks and live music.

== Products ==
Gizmo produces several year-round beers in different styles, as well as an unusually large rotating selection of seasonal and experimental beers. "Born to Bee" is a beer produced with wild yeast harvested from bees in a NC-State University research project.As of August 2017, Untappd's entry for Gizmo Brew Works listed a total of 113 different beers, with an average rating of 3.7/5.

At the Gizmo taproom, beers are sold as flights, pints, bottles, growlers, and kegs. Bottled Gizmo beers are sold at Weaver Street Market, a North Carolina organic food co-op, as well as many other retailers across the state.

== Awards ==
In 2016, Gizmo beers won awards at both the NC Brewers Cup and the Carolina Championship of Beers.

== See also ==
- Brewing in North Carolina
- List of microbreweries
