= Lizard Lick Towing =

American reality television show (2011–2014)

- Genre: Reality
- Starring: Ronnie Shirley; Amy Shirley; Big Juicy; Bobby Brantley
- Country of origin: United States
- Original language: English
- No. of seasons: 4
- No. of episodes: 91 (list of episodes)

Production
- Executive producers: Jessica Shreeve; Jo Inglott; Mike Gamson; Robyn Hutt; Steven Derek Booth
- Production company: Zodiak USA

Original release
- Network: truTV
- Release: February 7, 2011 – August 18, 2014

Related
- All Worked Up

Lizard Lick Towing is an American reality television show that originated as a spin-off of the series All Worked Up and ran for four seasons on truTV from February 7, 2011, to August 18, 2014. The show follows Ron and Amy Shirley, Bobby Brantley, and their team of repossession agents in Lizard Lick, North Carolina, the unincorporated area near the Raleigh suburb of Wendell.

== History ==
Lizard Lick Towing and Recovery is a local towing and recovery company owned and operated by Lizard Lick resident Ronnie Shirley and his wife Amy Shirley.

Ron Shirley started Lizard Lick Towing in 1998 with a single truck, along with his wife Amy Shirley. In 10 years, the company grew to 15 staff members and a fleet of 20 trucks. Bobby Brantley is Ron's friend and longtime co-worker, who started out as a dissatisfied customer after Ron towed his truck, then began working at Lizard Lick to pay off his debt.

Ron and Amy originally were going to be part of Wife Swap.

According to the local Eastern Wake News, the television series got its start at the end of August 2008, when the station sent a cameraman down for one day of shooting and that was all it took for a contract to be written. Those at the network were merely scouting out prospects at the time, but after realizing Amy Shirley was not only a powerlifter, but a mortician and co-owner of the recovery business, they realized there was more color to the picture than originally anticipated. Robyn Hutt, the truTV executive in charge of the show, was quoted by the Raleigh News and Observer "We really fell in love with Lizard Lick". The Shirleys are "dynamic and entertaining characters".

The first television series following Ronnie and his company operations was All Worked Up. TruTV later developed a new show solely dedicated to the Shirleys. The show premiered on February 7, 2011. The second season debuted on December 5, 2011. The third season premiered on January 21, 2013. The fourth season premiered on December 16, 2013. The series was canceled at the end of the fourth season.

On February 17, 2022, Ron Shirley's son Harley "Alex" Shirley was shot and killed outside a home in Garner, North Carolina. Authorities in Johnston County subsequently arrested two teenagers for the shooting of Alex Shirley and his female companion, Sophie Hagy.

== Cast ==
This is a list of the main cast members and guest stars who have appeared and are currently appearing on Lizard Lick Towing & Lick Life.

Key
= Main Cast
= Recurring cast member (cast member appears in two or more episodes in that series)
= Guest starring (cast member appears in only one episode in that series)

Cast member	Lizard Lick Towing			
Cast member	Season 1	Season 2	Season 3	Season 4
Ronnie Shirley	Main	Main	Main	Main
Amy Vaughn Shirley	Main	Main	Main	Main
Big Juicy	Recurring	Main	Main	Main
Bobby Brantley	Main	Main	Main	Main
Krazy Dave Eckler	Main	Main	Main	Main
Cassie	Recurring	Recurring	Recurring	Recurring
Johnny Reynolds	Recurring	Recurring	Recurring	Recurring
Lou			Recurring	Recurring
Earl				Recurring
Micky Visser	Guest	Guest	Guest	Guest
Grace	Recurring	Recurring	Recurring	Recurring

- Ronnie Lee Shirley, Jr.: Owner of Lizard Lick Towing and Recovery/Repo Man
- Amy Jane Shirley (née Vaughn): Vice President of Lizard Lick Towing
- Big Juicy: Driver and office worker; her "real" name is Diane
- Bobby Brantley: Ron's Employee
- "Krazy Dave" Eckler: Shop Mechanic, called "KD"
- Cassie: Bobby's on and off girlfriend
- Johnny Reynolds: Ronnie's cousin
- Lou: Employee
- Earl: Repo man
- Grace: Office employee
- Henry Cousins: Security guard

== Series overview ==
During the course of the original series, 91 episodes have aired.

Season	Episodes	Originally aired	
Season	Episodes	Season premiere	Season finale
1	12	February 7, 2011	October 10, 2011
2	26	December 5, 2011	September 3, 2012
3	26	January 21, 2013	September 30, 2013
4	27	December 16, 2013	August 18, 2014
