= Wendell Commercial Historic District =

Historic district in North Carolina, United States

- U.S. National Register of Historic Places
- U.S. Historic district
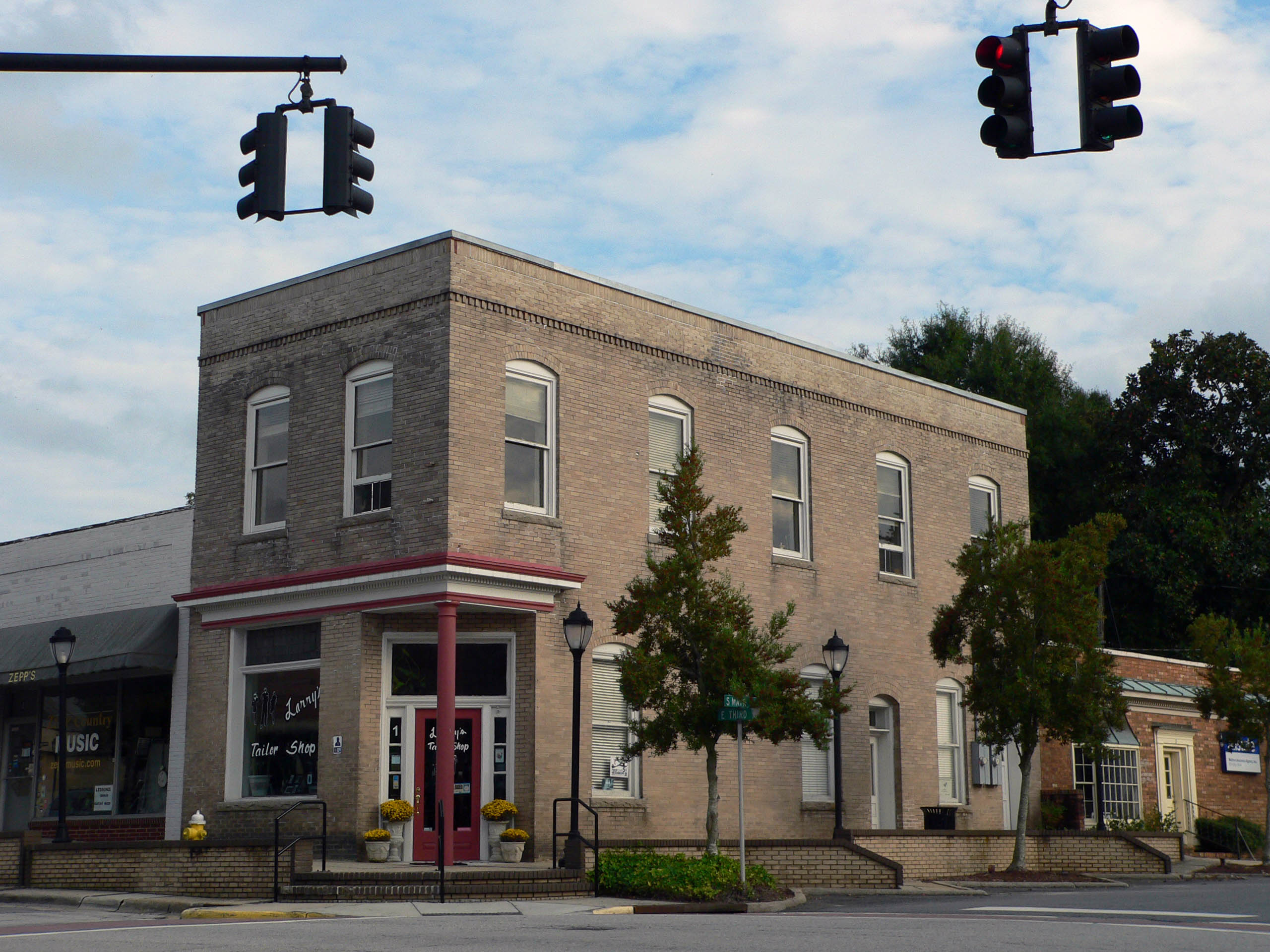
- The old Bank of Wendell building on the southeast corner of Main Street and Third

- Location within North Carolina Location within the United States
- Location: Roughly along jct. of Main St. and Third St., Wendell, North Carolina
- Coordinates: 35°46′52″N 78°22′15″W
- Area: 6 acres (2.4 ha)
- Built: 1906–1947
- Architectural style: Early Commercial
- MPS: Wake County MPS
- NRHP reference No.: 98000947
- Added to NRHP: July 31, 1998

The Wendell Commercial Historic District is a national historic district encompassing the historic central business district of Wendell, North Carolina, a town in eastern Wake County. The district is notable for its intact collection of one- and two-story brick masonry commercial buildings executed in the vernacular style typical of eastern North Carolina communities in the first half of the twentieth century. The roughly three-block district is bounded on the north by the 1906 Raleigh-Pamlico Railroad tracks, on the east by Pine Street, on the south by the rear property lines of the structures fronting Third Street, and on the west by the rear property lines of the buildings fronting Main Street. The district was listed on the National Register of Historic Places in July 1998.

== Buildings ==
	Image	Name	Location	Year
1		W. C. Campen Livery Stable	32-A North Main Street	1915
2		Storage Building	34 North Main Street	1925
3		Commercial Building	16–32 North Main Street	1925
4		Commercial Building	14 North Main Street	1920
5		Commercial Building	6–12 North Main Street	1915
6		Commercial Building	2–4 North Main Street	1915
7		Bank of Wendell	1 South Main Street	1917
8		Commercial Building	25–33 North Main Street	1920
9		Commercial Building	21 North Main Street	1920
10		Commercial Building	17 North Main Street	1920
11		Commercial Building	13 North Main Street	1920
12		Commercial Building	9 North Main Street	1925
13		Commercial Building	5 North Main Street	1920
14		Commercial Building	1 North Main Street	1920
15		W. R. Nowell Drugstore	4 South Main Street	1915
16		R. B. Whitley Tobacco Auction House	21 East Third Street	1919
17		Commercial Building	15 East Third Street	1935
18		Commercial Building	11 East Third Street	1930
19		Commercial Building	7 East Third Street	1930
20		Esso Service Station	22 East Third Street	1920
21		Commercial Building	20 East Third Street	1920
22		Commercial Building	14–16 East Third Street	1940
23		Commercial Building	8 East Third Street	1940
24		Commercial Building	4 East Third Street	1940
25		Commercial Building	11 West Third Street	1935
26		Commercial Building	13–15 West Third Street	1935

== See also ==
- List of Registered Historic Places in North Carolina
