= Riley Hill School =

Historic school building in North Carolina, United States

- U.S. National Register of Historic Places
- Location within North Carolina Location within the United States
- Location: NC 2320, 0.2 miles (0.32 km) east of NC 2318, near Wendell, North Carolina
- Coordinates: 35°51′34″N 78°24′59″W
- Area: 4 acres (1.6 ha)
- Built: 1928
- Built by: Strickland Brothers
- Architectural style: Colonial Revival
- NRHP reference No.: 01000415
- Added to NRHP: April 25, 2001

Riley Hill School is a historic Rosenwald School building located in Wendell, North Carolina, a town in eastern Wake County. It was built in 1928, and is a one-story, brick building with an H-shaped plan. The five-bay original section has a one-story porch with simple Doric order columns in the Colonial Revival style. The school closed its doors in 1970, but was purchased in 1991 by the Riley Hill Baptist Church. It caught fire on September 25, 2020. Much of the structure was damaged.

In April 2001, Riley Hill School was listed on the National Register of Historic Places.

== See also ==
- List of Registered Historic Places in North Carolina
