= Greg Ellis (American football) =

American football player (born 1975)

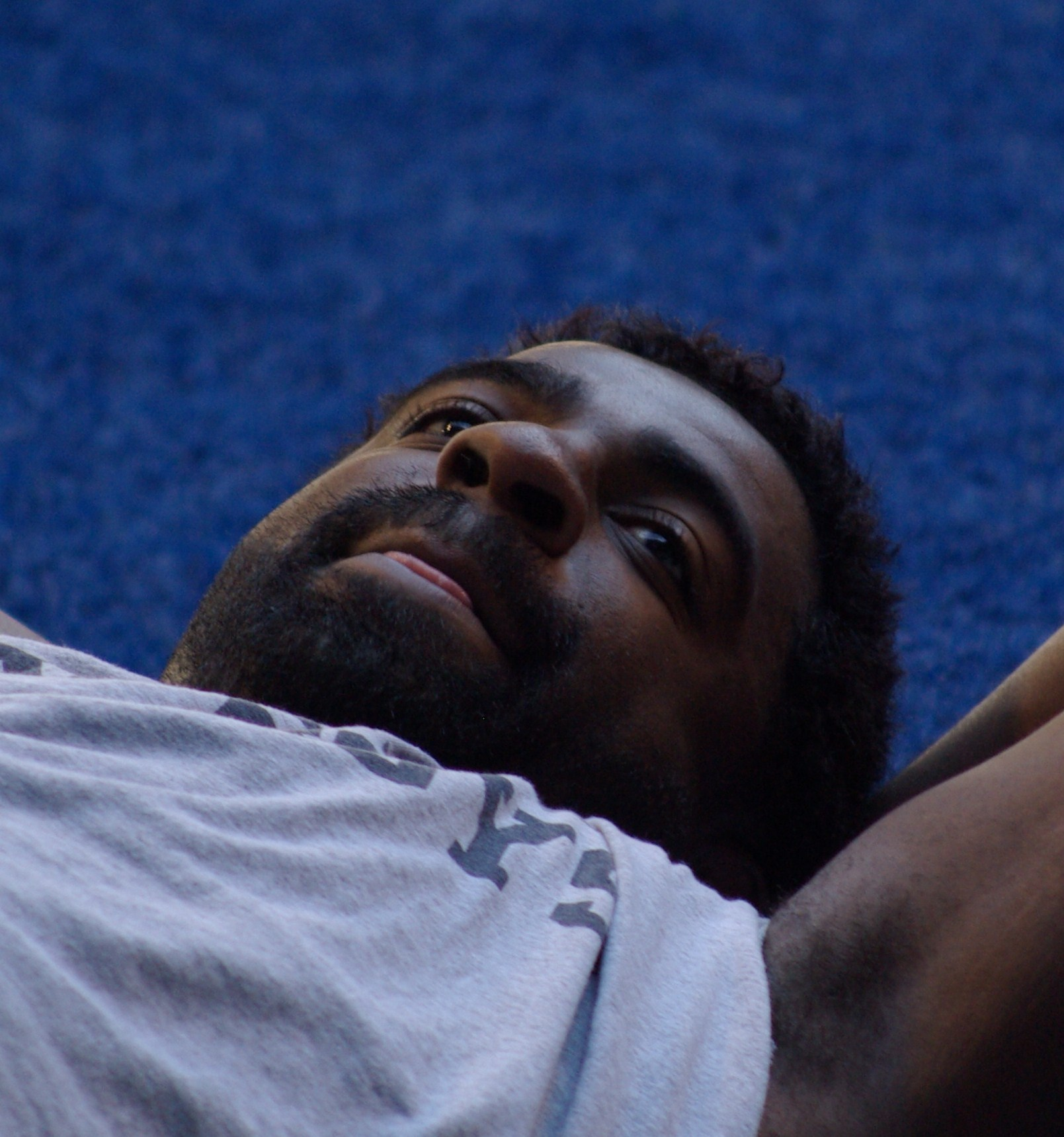
- Ellis in 2008

Dallas Cowboys
- Title: Assistant defensive line coach

Personal information
- Born: August 14, 1975 (age 51); Wendell, North Carolina, U.S.
- Listed height: 6 ft 6 in (1.98 m)
- Listed weight: 265 lb (120 kg)

Career information
- High school: East Wake (Wendell)
- College: North Carolina
- NFL draft: 1998: 1st round, 8th overall pick

Career history

Playing
- Dallas Cowboys (1998–2008); Oakland Raiders (2009)

Coaching
- Texas College (2020–2021) Head coach; SAGU (2022–2023) Head coach; Dallas Cowboys (2024–present) Assistant defensive line coach

Awards and highlights
- NFL Comeback Player of the Year (2007); Pro Bowl (2007); Consensus All-American (1997); Third-team All-American (1996); 3× First-team All-ACC (1995–1997); North Carolina Tar Heels Jersey No. 87 honored

Career NFL statistics
- Tackles: 531
- Sacks: 84
- Forced fumbles: 22
- Fumble recoveries: 11
- Interceptions: 4
- Defensive touchdowns: 2
- Stats at Pro Football Reference

Gregory Lemont Ellis (born August 14, 1975) is an American former professional football player who was a defensive end in the National Football League (NFL) for the Dallas Cowboys and Oakland Raiders. He was selected by the Cowboys in the first round of the 1998 NFL draft. He played college football for the North Carolina Tar Heels, and was recognized as an All-American.

== Early life ==
Ellis was born in Wendell, North Carolina. He attended East Wake High School in Wendell. He was named Male High School Athlete of the Year in 1993 by the Raleigh News and Observer.

== College career ==
Ellis accepted a football scholarship from the University of North Carolina at Chapel Hill (UNC). As a freshman with the Tar Heels in 1994, he had four sacks a back-up defensive end.

As a sophomore in 1995, he was named the starter at right defensive end and was named first-team All-ACC. He also received honorable mention All-American by UPI, while recording 71 tackles and seven sacks.

As a junior in 1996, he was named second-team All-American by The Sporting News and was a first-team All-ACC selection after closing the season with 62 tackles and 12.5 sacks—the second most sacks in Tar Heels history, behind Lawrence Taylor's 16 in 1979.

As a senior in 1997, he was named a consensus All-American and became just the fourth tar heel to earn first-team All-ACC honors three times. He finished his college career with 244 tackles, 32.5 sacks (school record) and 50 tackles for loss (third in school history).

In 2025, he was inducted into the North Carolina Sports Hall of Fame. His jersey number 87 is honored at Kenan Stadium.

== Professional career ==
Pre-draft measurables
Height	Weight	Arm length	Hand span	40-yard dash	10-yard split	20-yard split	20-yard shuttle	Three-cone drill	Vertical jump	Broad jump	Bench press
6 ft 5 1/4 in (1.96 m)	281 lb (127 kg)	34 5/8 in (0.88 m)	10 1/4 in (0.26 m)	4.87 s	1.73 s	2.84 s	4.48 s	8.03 s	35.5 in (0.90 m)	9 ft 10 in (3.00 m)	26 reps
All values from NFL Combine

=== Dallas Cowboys ===
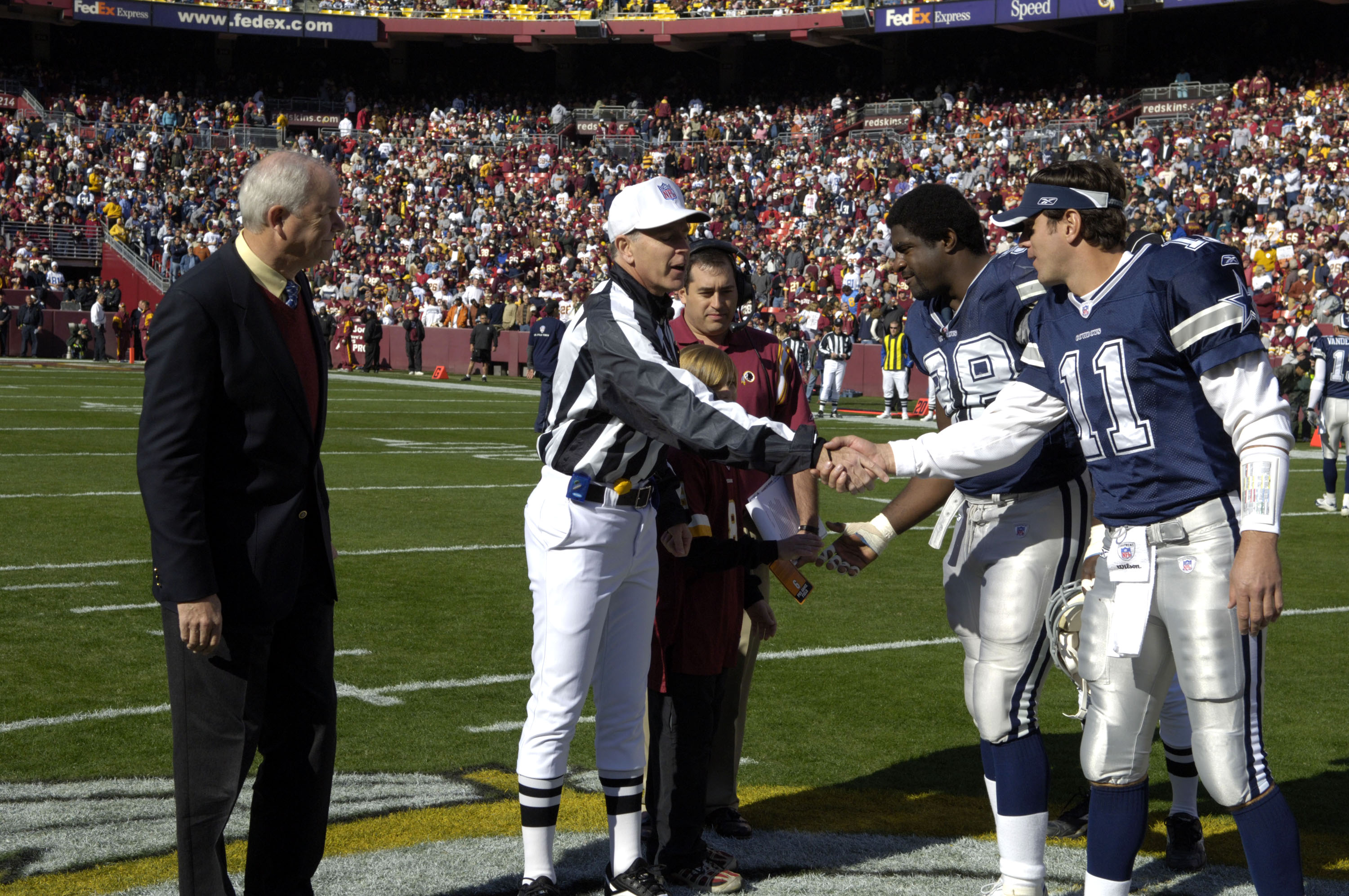
Ellis with Drew Bledsoe in a 2006 game.

Ellis was selected with the eighth pick of the first round in the 1998 NFL draft by the Dallas Cowboys, a selection which caused a great stir among Cowboys fans who were disappointed that the team passed on the opportunity to take Randy Moss. Although rumored to be the destination where Moss would end up, Dallas opted to take a player in Ellis who did not possess the character issues that Moss did.

He became a starter at defensive end for Dallas immediately and started 155 of 162 games during his Cowboy career from 1998 to 2008. For the first eight years he spent a similar amount of time as the starting right end as he did the starting left end. In 2006, he was moved to outside linebacker as Bill Parcells implemented his 3-4 defense. Ellis started 35 games and made 38 total appearances at outside linebacker from 2006 to 2008.

During his tenure in Dallas he totaled 77 quarterback sacks, 377 tackles, 20 forced fumbles nine fumble recoveries and four interceptions. He scored two touchdowns, both in 1999, one coming on an 87-yard interception return and the other on a 98-yard return of a fumble recovery.

Ellis's top season in quarterback sacks was 2007 when he tallied 12.5 sacks in only 13 games. Other top sack seasons were 2004 (9.0), 2003 and 2005 (8.0 each) and 1999 and 2002 (7.5 each). In 2007 Ellis was selected for the NFC Pro Bowl roster and was named the NFL Comeback Player of the Year, acknowledging his return from a season-ending Achilles tendon suffered during the 2006 campaign.

The Cowboys decided to release Ellis on June 2, 2009, saving $4.15 million in cap space.

=== Oakland Raiders ===
Ellis agreed on a 3-year contract for $10 million with the Oakland Raiders on June 15, 2009. He returned to the position of defensive end in a 4-3 scheme, joining a defensive line that would also include former Patriot and All-pro Richard Seymour. He started all 14 games he appeared in at right defensive end. He amassed seven quarterback sacks, 26 tackles, two forced fumbles and two fumble recoveries. He was released on March 8, 2010.

== Coaching career ==
In 2020, Ellis returned to football to become the head football coach at Texas College, a historically black college (HBCU) and National Association of Intercollegiate Athletics (NAIA) members, located in Tyler, Texas. The 2020 season was canceled due to the COVID-19 pandemic. During the 2021 football season, the Texas College lost all of their 11 games.

On March 31, 2022, it was announced that Ellis would be leaving Texas College. In June 2022, Ellis was hired as the head football coach at Southwestern Assemblies of God University in Waxahachie, Texas, a conference opponent of Texas College. On November 27, 2023, Ellis resigned. On February 16, 2024, he was hired by the Dallas Cowboys as an assistant defensive line coach, reuniting with his former defensive coordinator Mike Zimmer. In 2025, he was let go after the Cowboys hired new head coach Brian Schottenheimer.

== Personal life ==
While attending East Wake High School, he met his wife, Tangie Ellis. They have three children together: Tyann, Geremiah and Taliah.

He has also produced for television and film, including as the executive producer of the 2015 sports film Carter High.

== NFL career statistics ==
=== Regular season ===
Year	Team	Games		Tackles					Interceptions					Fumbles			
Year	Team	GP	GS	Cmb	Solo	Ast	Sck	Sfty	Int	Yds	Lng	TD	PD	FF	FR	Yds	TD
1998	DAL	16	16	39	27	12	3.0	0	0	0	0	0	0	1	1	2	0
1999	DAL	13	13	42	36	6	7.5	0	1	87	87	1	3	2	1	98	1
2000	DAL	16	16	52	39	13	3.0	0	0	0	0	0	1	0	2	0	0
2001	DAL	16	16	60	45	15	6.0	0	0	0	0	0	5	3	2	0	0
2002	DAL	15	15	68	51	17	7.5	0	1	0	0	0	4	1	0	0	0
2003	DAL	16	15	49	35	14	8.0	0	0	0	0	0	8	4	0	0	0
2004	DAL	16	16	59	44	15	9.0	0	0	0	0	0	9	1	0	0	0
2005	DAL	16	13	35	25	10	8.0	0	0	0	0	0	6	2	2	37	0
2006	DAL	9	9	31	24	7	4.5	0	1	-1	-1	0	3	3	0	0	0
2007	DAL	13	10	31	24	7	12.5	0	0	0	0	0	1	3	0	0	0
2008	DAL	16	16	36	25	11	8.0	0	1	11	11	0	1	0	1	0	0
2009	OAK	14	14	29	25	4	7.0	0	0	0	0	0	1	2	2	0	0
Career		176	169	531	400	131	84.0	0	4	97	87	1	42	22	11	137	1

== Head coaching record ==
Year	Team	Overall	Conference	Standing	Bowl/playoffs
Texas College Steers (Sooner Athletic Conference) (2020–2021)
2020–21	No team—COVID-19				
2021	Texas College	0–11	0–9	10th	
Texas College:		0–11	0–9		
SAGU Lions (Sooner Athletic Conference) (2022–2023)
2022	SAGU	7–3	6–3	T–4th	L Victory
2023	SAGU	4–6	4–5	6th	
SAGU:		11–9	9–8		
Total:		11–20			
