= Dr. Thomas H. Avera House =

Historic house in North Carolina, United States

- U.S. National Register of Historic Places
- Location within North Carolina Location within the United States
- Location: 6600 Robertson Pond Rd., near Wendell, North Carolina
- Coordinates: 35°49′7″N 78°24′11″W
- Area: 5.1 acres (2.1 ha)
- Built: c. 1874
- Architectural style: Gothic, Italianate
- MPS: Wake County MPS
- NRHP reference No.: 03000928
- Added to NRHP: September 11, 2003

The Dr. Thomas H. Avera House (also known as the Avera-Winston House) is a historic house located at 6600 Robertson Pond Road near Wendell, Wake County, North Carolina.

== Description and history ==
It was built about 1874, and is a two-story, T-shaped, Italianate style frame dwelling with Gothic design elements. Also on the property are the contributing privy, smokehouse, and dairy, all built about 1874. The house, facing north, is sited close to the road that has been cut deeply forming a steep slope up to the house lot.

It was listed on the National Register of Historic Places on September 11, 2003.

== See also ==
- List of Registered Historic Places in North Carolina
