= Wendell Boulevard Historic District =

Historic district in North Carolina, United States

- U.S. National Register of Historic Places
- U.S. Historic district
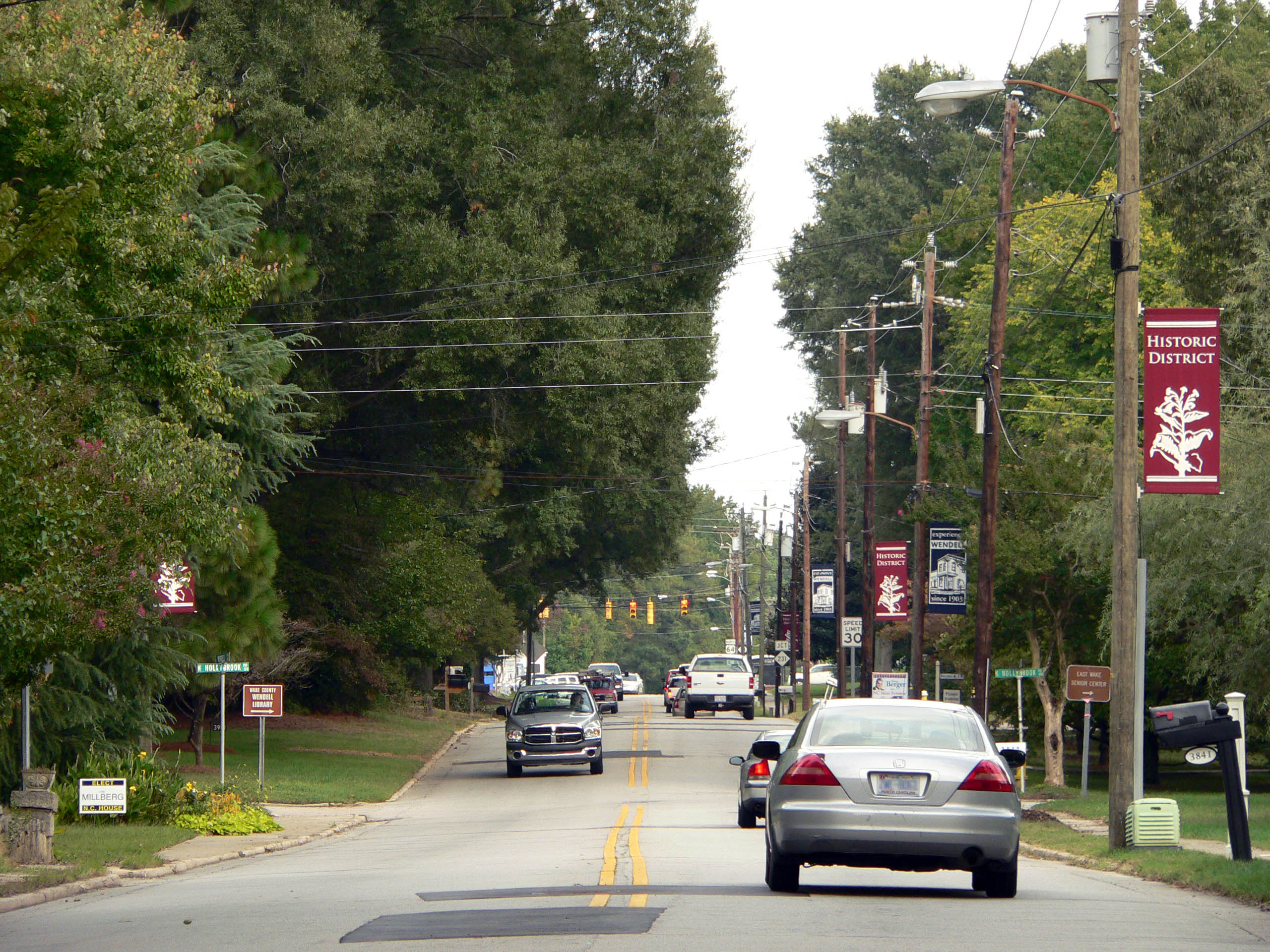
- East Wendell Boulevard, September 2012

- Location within North Carolina Location within the United States
- Location: Wendell Blvd., Mattox St., Old Zebulon Rd., Buffalo St. and Main St., Wendell, North Carolina
- Coordinates: 35°47′04″N 78°21′58″W
- Area: 43 acres (17 ha)
- Built: c. 1890
- Architectural style: Colonial Revival, Bungalow/craftsman
- MPS: Wake County MPS
- NRHP reference No.: 09000382
- Added to NRHP: June 3, 2009

The Wendell Boulevard Historic District is a national historic district located at Wendell, North Carolina, a town in eastern Wake County. The residential district encompasses 74 contributing buildings built between about 1890 and 1958. It includes notable examples of Colonial Revival and Bungalow / American Craftsman style architecture. Notable buildings include the Wendell Baptist Church (1937), Wendell United Methodist Church (1923), and a service station (1958).

The district was listed on the National Register of Historic Places in 2009.
