= Sunnyside (Wendell, North Carolina) =

Historic house in North Carolina, United States

- U.S. National Register of Historic Places
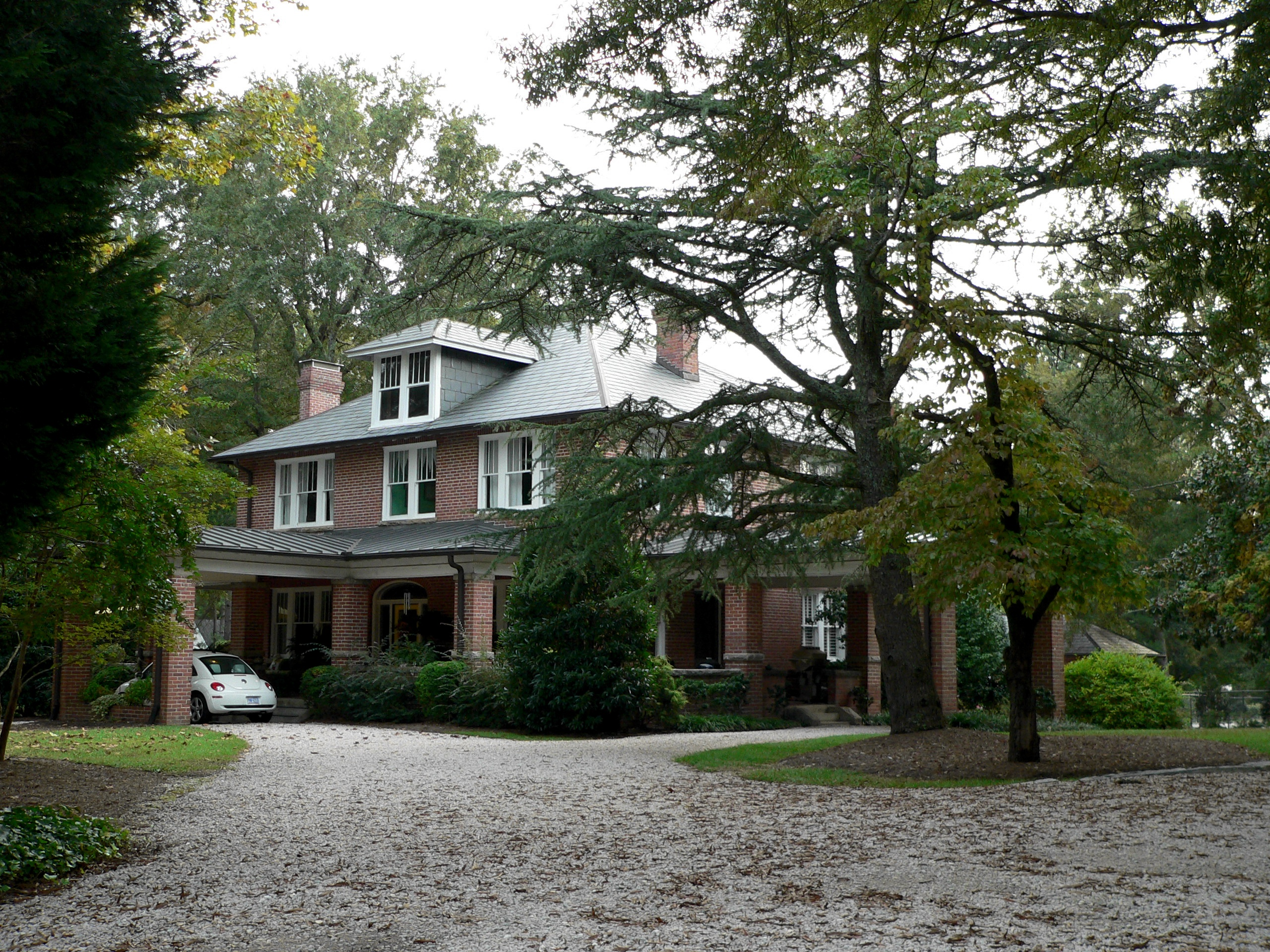
- Sunnyside viewed from the northeast

- Location within North Carolina Location within the United States
- Location: 210 S. Selma Rd., Wendell, North Carolina
- Coordinates: 35°46′39″N 78°21′46″W
- Area: 1.1 acres (0.45 ha)
- Built: 1918
- Architectural style: Bungalow/Craftsman
- MPS: Wake County MPS
- NRHP reference No.: 01001113
- Added to NRHP: October 15, 2001

Sunnyside, also known as the R.B. Whitley House, is a historic home located in Wendell, North Carolina, a town in eastern Wake County. The Craftsman house was built in 1918 by R. B. Whitley, a prominent Wendell businessman who founded the Bank of Wendell in 1907.

The brick home features car shelters on the front and side, a modern detail during the 1910s. In addition to the home, a wash house, smokehouse, garage, and four entrance pillars are located on the property. According to family tradition, Sunnyside was used as a hospital during the Spanish flu epidemic of 1918.

Sunnyside was listed on the National Register of Historic Places in October 2001.

== See also ==
- List of Registered Historic Places in North Carolina
