= Hood–Anderson Farm =

Historic farm in North Carolina, United States

- U.S. National Register of Historic Places
- U.S. Historic district
- Location within North Carolina Location within the United States
- Location: Old Battle Bridge Rd., 0.4 miles (0.64 km) south of the junction with Old Tarboro Rd., Eagle Rock, North Carolina
- Coordinates: 35°47′46″N 78°24′20″W
- Area: 138 acres (56 ha)
- Built: 1839
- Architect: William Henry Hood
- Architectural style: Greek Revival
- MPS: Wake County MPS
- NRHP reference No.: 99000509
- Added to NRHP: April 29, 1999

The Hood–Anderson Farm is a historic home and farm and national historic district located at Eagle Rock, Wake County, North Carolina, a suburb of the state capital Raleigh. The main house was built about 1839, and is an example of transitional Federal / Greek Revival style I-house. It is two stories with a low-pitched hip roof and a rear two-story, hipped-roof ell. The front facade features a large, one-story porch, built in 1917, supported by Tuscan order columns. Also on the property are the contributing combined general store and post office (1854), a one-room dwelling, a two-room tenant/slave house, a barn (1912), a smokehouse, and several other outbuildings and sites including a family cemetery.

== Main House ==
The following is according to national records, which are cited: The house is reached by an unpaved driveway, outlined by a formal aIle of juniper trees that are estimated to be one hundred and fifty years old. Viewed from above, the main house on the Hood-Anderson Farm is L-shaped, made up of an original two-story, east-facing I-plan house with a low-pitched hip roof and a rear two-story, hipped-roof ell that connects with the northern half of the original I-house. Behind the ell to the west is a one-story, hipped-roof breezeway, enclosed in the 1950s, connecting to a one-story kitchen that dates from 1912. The house is set on a foundation of fieldstone piers with some brick piers supporting the additions. The front elevation of the house is three bays wide and is dominated by a large, one-story porch, built in 1917, with a hip roof covered in tin. The porch runs the width of the house and features solid wooden Tuscan columns (purchased In 1912), one at each corner, and four columns, set in two closely spaced pairs, on either side of the wide wooden central steps leading up to the porch. Tuscan pilasters (half-columns) are set against the house at either end of the porch. Photographic and structural evidence indicates that the original porch on the house was narrower and probably had a second story deck with a balustrade onto which a door opened from the upstairs central hall, possibly similar to the porch on nearby Midway Plantation (NR 1970). A photo circa 1888 shows the house with flush boards surrounding the front door; a few flush boards were never removed and are still in place, hidden by the hip roof of the current porch. According to family letters, the upstairs door was made into a window in 1917. Two exterior end-chimneys, well constructed of ashlar masonry, frame the house on either side, serving the four fireplaces in the original one-bay deep I-plan part of the house. The chimney on the north side of the house was rebuilt in the early twentieth century. A couple of stones have fallen from the top of the chimney on the south side. A third, partially enclosed, chimney on the west end of the ell serves its two fireplaces. The front doors open into a central hall that extends through the house to the double back doors, which also have six transom lights. The rear doors have 1/1 beveled panels and are original. A steep staircase with a closet underneath rises next to the front door on the north side. Through the rear doors of the central hall is the L-shaped back porch that borders the west side of the original section of the house and the south side of the ell. The back porch has a hip roof supported by square posts.

== General Store ==
Built in 1854, the General store/post office is a rectangular two-room structure on fieldstone piers with unpainted weatherboard siding and a metal roof. The roof is hipped in the front and gabled in the back. The three-bay front has two sets of original shutter on the windows that flank the entrance. The small back storekeeper's room has four over four windows and a fireplace served by a cut-stone exterior chimney on the gable end. The interior was finished in plaster and retains its countertops, shelves, and a wooden rack used to separate mail. Constructed to replace an earlier building with the same functions that burned in 1854, it was used as a combined Eagle Rock Post Office and general store from 1854 to 1874, and it remained in use as a store until the early twentieth century when it began to be used for storage. This building is quite important in that it is "the only antebellum store building known to survive in the county". It is in fair condition.

== One Room Dwelling (1830s) ==
The one-room dwelling stands on low fieldstone piers and is covered by unpainted weatherboards and a metal gabled roof. It has a cut-stone chimney at one end and three small four over four windows. The doors are board and batten. The frame is mortise and tenon construction. The interior is unfinished. The building shows signs of decay, and the chimney was damaged by a falling limb in Hurricane Fran. It is located very near the main house.

== Barn ==
Built in 1912, the large barn with a gabled metal roof and weatherboard sheathing has livestock stalls on the ground level and a large, open hayloft above. There is a shed extension on the west side with an entrance wide enough for a buggy or cart. It is painted white and is in good condition. It was previously used to store the tenant's horses, circa. 1990-2000.

== Two-room Tenant/Slave House ==
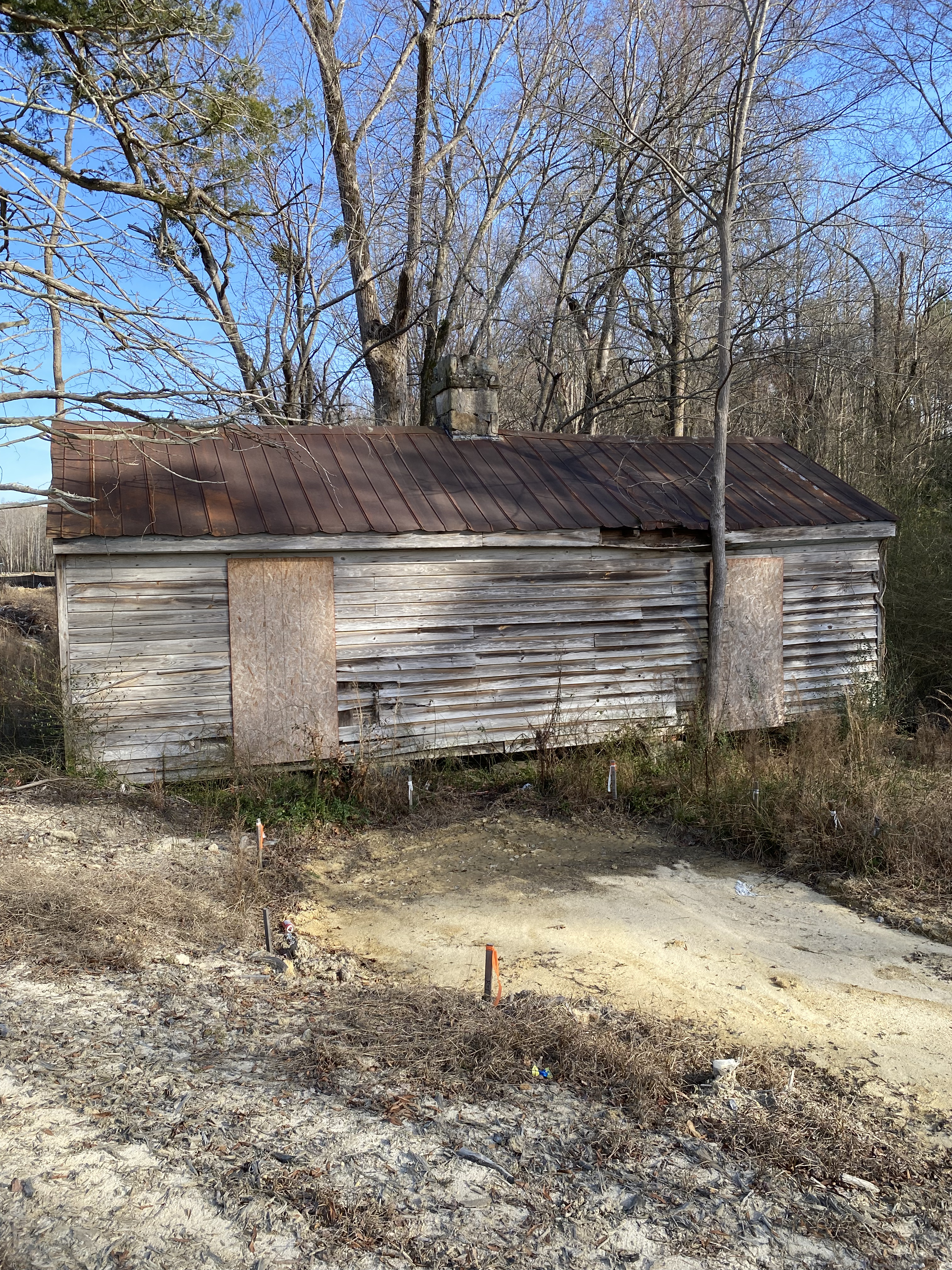
Hood-Anderson slave house

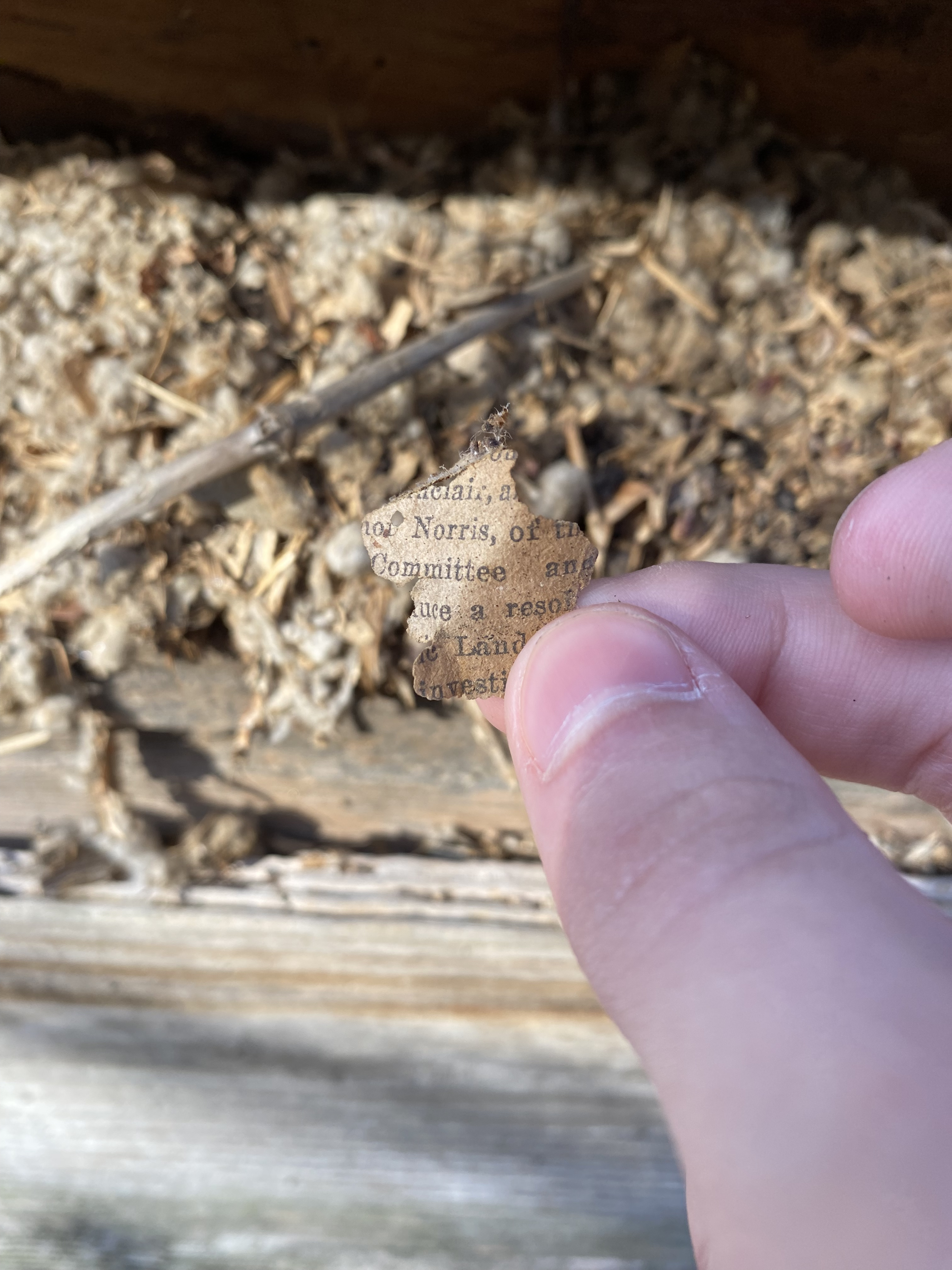
Insulation of the Hood Family's secondary slave shack

Across the road from and south of the main house, there was a one-story, two-room tenant/slave house that had two rooms on either side of a large, central stone chimney. The house was built on fieldstone piers with axe-hewn log floor joists, hand hewn sills, and very wide floor boards. Each room had a single front door and a single, small 4/4 window in the rear. It had a metal gable roof and unpainted weatherboard siding on the exterior. The interior was finished with plaster. The five-panel doors it more recently had were probably added at a later date. This particular building was discussed in The Historic Architecture of Wake County/ North Carolina as a typical example of the type of buildings inhabited by slaves and tenant farmers during the early and mid nineteenth century, and it is noted that few examples of this type survive. It was in fair condition. The insulation contained what appeared to be newspapers. It was torn down by construction company D.R. Horton in mid-2024.

In April 1999, the Hood–Anderson Farm was listed on the National Register of Historic Places.

== See also ==
- List of Registered Historic Places in North Carolina
