= Bearded Bee Brewing Company =

Brewery in Wendell, North Carolina

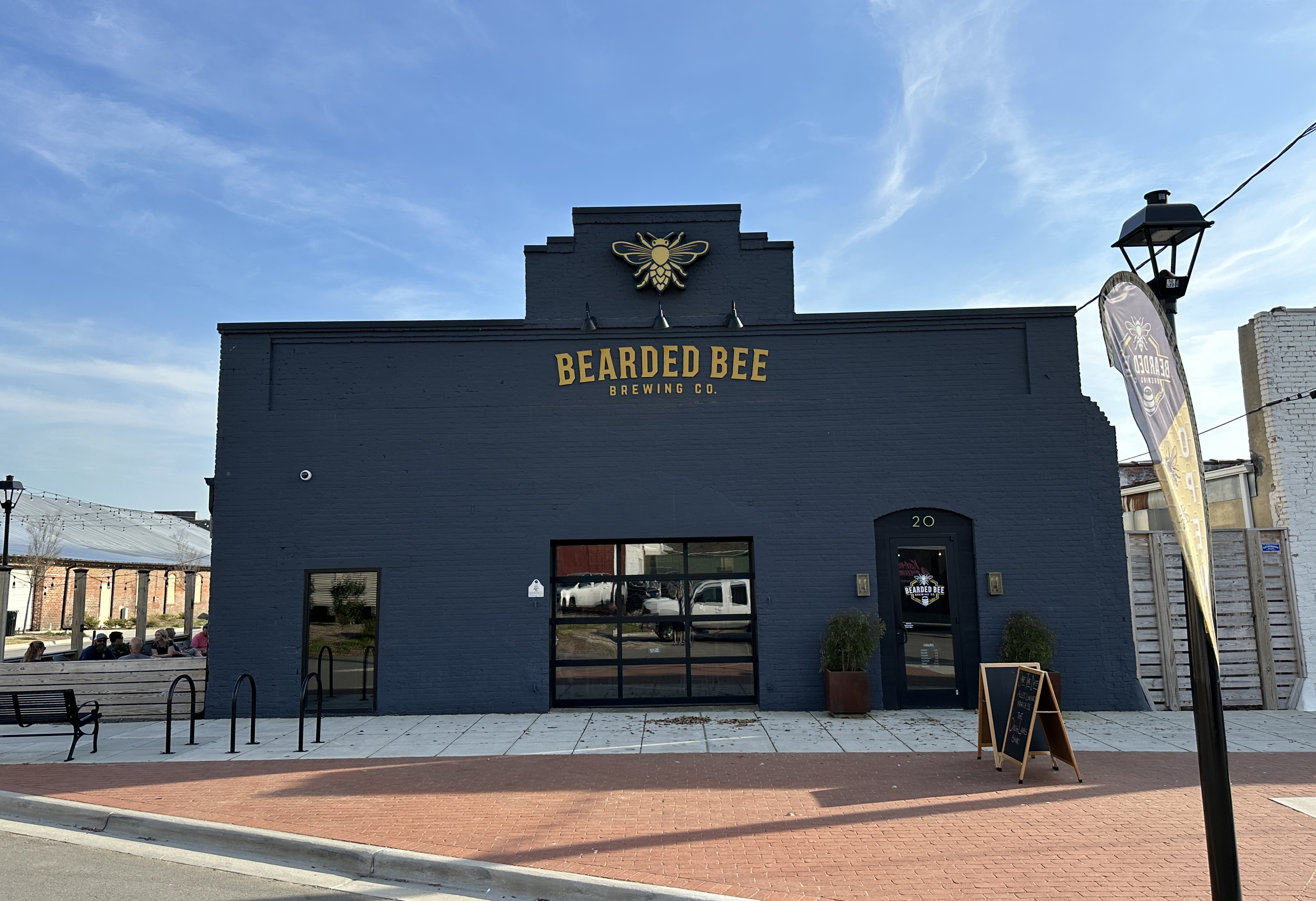
- The Bearded Bee Brewery in March 2023
- Type: Limited Liability Company (Domestic)
- Location: Wendell, North Carolina
- Coordinates: 35°46′54.4″N 78°22′09.7″W
- Opened: July 31, 2020
- Key people: Derek T. Ayscue, Keri Wilder Ayscue, Dave Lewis, and William Delano
- Other products: Wine, Mead, Cider, Ginger beer, and Soft drinks
- Owned by: Derek T. Ayscue
- Website: beardedbeebrewing.com

Bearded Bee Brewing Company is a brewery located in Wendell, North Carolina. Since opening on July 31, 2020, the brewery has involved itself with the community by participating in town events, hosting food trucks, and supporting local beekeeping efforts to become a major community gathering place within the town.

== History ==
The building the brewery now occupies on 20 E. Campen Street in the Wendell Historic District was built around 1915. The building was first occupied by Campen Livery & Stable, a livery yard owned and operated by W.C. Campen, who also became the namesake for the street. The building would change hands several times between families, and in its history would be used as a "warehouse, furniture shop, garage, and lawn mower repair shop," according to the brewery's website. At the time renovations began in early January 2020 for the brewery, Perry's Warehouse Inc. occupied the building. The brewery was officially opened during the COVID-19 lockdown in the state on July 31, 2020. The business was founded by Derek and Keri Ayscue, along with their friend Dave Lewis, after forming a partnership in honey and mead production in 2017. Most beer is still made using these products from local and on-site apiaries.

While the brewery was being built, a mural of pollinators including bees was painted throughout mid-2020 by artist Matthew Willey on the building to the left-hand side. The purpose of the artwork was to support the likewise named brewery and the artist's personal goal to paint 50,000 individual honeybees worldwide.

== Interior ==
The interior of the brewery is furnished with modern décor including large communal and high-top tables, lounge furniture, and bee-themed objects such as a honeycomb shaped light fixture in the middle of the large taproom. The brewery also has an adjacent beer garden on the left-hand side of the building.

== Events and activities ==
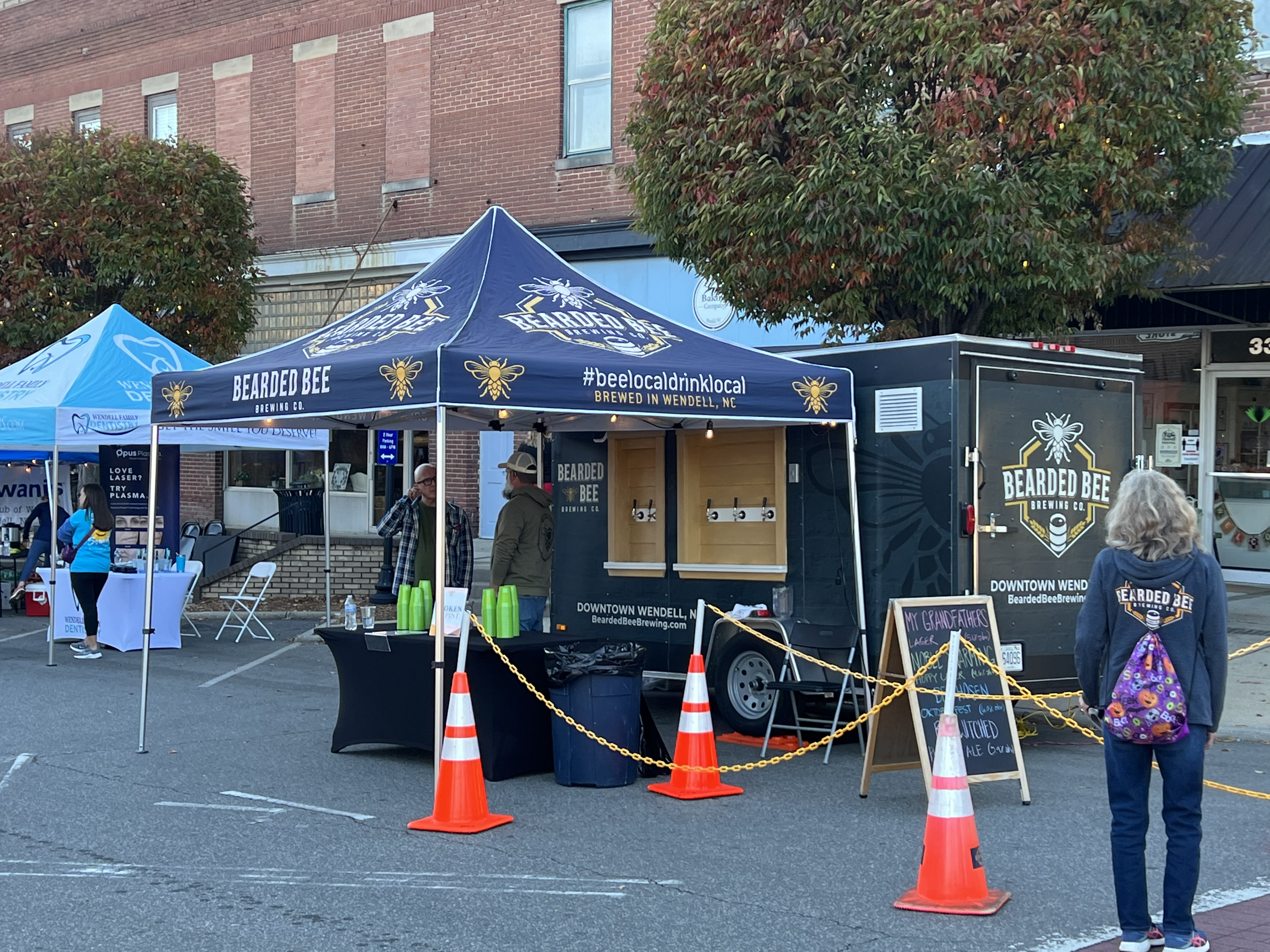
Beadred Bee set-up during Wendell's Meet-On-Main event in October 2022

The Bearded Bee frequently holds events in the establishment, including hosting live music nights by local musicians, bingo nights, and trivia nights. Outside of the establishment, food trucks are often present which are advertised by the business.

The brewery has also held outdoor axe throwing competitions, broadcast films for the holidays, and participated in town-sponsored events such as Meet-On-Main. (Note: See section photo)

== Awards ==
The brewery has mainly received positive reviews from the community since its opening. In WRAL's "Voters Choice Award" category for Best Brewery, Bearded Bee won 4th in 2020, 3rd in 2021, 1st in 2022 and 2023, and 2nd in 2024.

The brewery also won Raleigh Magazine's award for "Best Burb Bar" in 2021, 1st in WRAL podcast 919 Beers "Battle of the Brews" in 2021, 3rd in Mill Chills "Brewery Throwdown" in 2021,
