= Southeastern Free Will Baptist College =

- Motto: To Know Him and To Make Him Known
- Type: Bible college
- Established: 1983
- Chairman: Gene Williams
- President: Dr. Jeff Jones
- Dean: Ken Cash
- Students: 78
- Location: Wendell, North Carolina, United States; 35.8004°N 78.4166°W
- Colors: red, black, and white
- Website: www.sfwbc.edu

Southeastern Free Will Baptist College is a college of the Free Will Baptist denomination located in Wendell, North Carolina. It was started in Virginia Beach, Virginia at Gateway FWB Church. Gene Williams is Chairman of the Board of Directors. According to the college's website, "The purpose of Southeastern Free Will Baptist College is to train young men and women for church-related ministries." In 2023 Dr. Jeff Jones took over as President, replacing Nate Ange.

== Degrees and certificates ==
Southeastern was established in 1983 and offers bachelor's degrees in Pastoral Theology, Teacher Education, Missions, Music, Bible, and Business Administration. Two-year associate's degrees in Ministry and Business Administration are also available. This school is accredited through the Transnational Association of Christian Colleges and Schools.

== Student information ==
The college has a student base from Free Will Baptist and Baptist churches across the country. Approximate cost of this college is $16,300 per year including tuition, room and board, and fees. Financial aid is available.
