= Nantahala Brewing Company =

Craft brewery located in Bryson City, North Carolina

- Location: 61 Depot Street, Bryson City, North Carolina 28713-7821
- Coordinates: 35.431448°N 83.446181°W
- Website: http://www.nantahalabrewing.com/

Nantahala Brewing Company is a craft brewery located in Bryson City, North Carolina. The brewery was founded in 2009 by Chris Collier, Joe Rowland and Ken Smith. It's located at 61 Depot Street, Bryson City, North Carolina, across the street from the Great Smoky Mountains Railroad train depot. September 2023 - Nantahala Brewing Company is closed
