= Lizard Lick, North Carolina =

Lizard Lick
- Unincorporated community
- Location within the state of North Carolina
- Coordinates: 35°49′00″N 78°22′30″W
- Country: United States
- State: North Carolina
- County: Wake County
- Elevation: 331 ft (101 m)
- Time zone: UTC-5 (Eastern (EST))
  - Summer (DST): UTC-4 (EDT)
- ZIP code: 27591
- Area code: 919
- GNIS feature ID: 1021251

Lizard Lick is an unincorporated community in Wake County, North Carolina, United States. The community is located at the crossroads of Lizard Lick Road and NC 97. Lizard Lick has frequently been noted on lists of unusual place names.

The community is approximately 20 miles (32 km) east of the state capital of Raleigh, along NC 97. It is about 3 miles (4.8 km) north of Wendell and 3 miles (4.8 km) west of Zebulon.

== History ==
According to North Carolina historian William S. Powell, the town got its name from a "passing observer who saw many lizards sunning and licking themselves on a rail fence." Regardless of the town name, local community members who are native to the area are proud of their origins, and their economic future in the area. In May 1997, the state installed the first traffic light in Lizard Lick, marking a new period of "increasing property values" and growth.

== Media attention ==
In March 1998 the small town received publicity when Nintendo first released the Nintendo 64 game "Yoshi's Story" there, with the name of the host town reflecting the Nintendo character Yoshi's ability to extend his tongue over a long distance. The pre-launch choice of Lizard Lick was the idea of Pasadena, California-based PR consultant Dereck Andrade. Andrade had been retained by the public relations firm Golin-Harris in Los Angeles to launch Yoshi's Story. Andrade chose two cities — French Lick, Indiana, and Lizard Lick — as possible launch sites for the game. Lizard Lick was finally chosen over French Lick because the character of Yoshi was a dinosaur, which was related to a lizard. The game's launch in Lizard Lick was the largest event ever covered by the news media for a Nintendo product, bringing national and international news media to the crossroads town, including ABC World News Tonight, the CBS Evening News, and NBC's The Today Show.

In September 2009, Lizard Lick once again received publicity, this time on a national level. The Time Warner-owned TruTV cable television network became aware of a local towing and recovery company owned and operated by evangelist and Lizard Lick honorary "Mayor" Ronnie Shirley and his wife Amy called Lizard Lick Towing and Recovery. According to the Eastern Wake News, the television series, originally title Lizard Lick Towing and later titled Lick Life, got its start at the end of August 2008, when the station sent a cameraman down for one day of shooting, and that was all it took for a contract to be written. Those at the network were merely scouting out prospects at the time, but after realizing Amy Shirley was not only a power lifter, but a mortician and co-owner of the recovery business, they realized there was "more color" to the picture than originally anticipated.

In addition, they soon discovered that Ronnie is a "walking reality show". Robyn Hutt, the truTV executive in charge of the show, was quoted by the News & Observer (the largest regional daily newspaper of the Research Triangle Park area, covering several counties in North Carolina), as saying that they "really fell in love with Lizard Lick" and that the Shirleys are "dynamic and entertaining characters".

The television series (Lizard Lick Towing) following Ronnie and his company operations was called All Worked Up and had a discussion forum, Ronnie's published poetry, interviews with the stars of the show and further information, including the scheduled show times. The Shirleys now have their own show called Lizard Lick Towing. It is a half-hour program that is shown on the TruTV network. The show premiered on February 7, 2011. It is dedicated entirely to Lizard Lick Towing and Recovery, due to its fast growing popularity from the segments of the show All Worked Up.

== Notable people ==
- Josh Grizzard — Professional football coach and former collegiate football player and coach.
- Ronnie Shirley~ owner of Lizard Lick Towing and reality TV star.
