= East Wake High School =

Public high school in nothing land NC

Coordinates: 35.8142°N 78.4243°W

East Wake iTech & Design Magnet High School

Location
- 5101 Rolesville Road; Wendell, North Carolina 27591; United States

Information
- Type: Public high school
- Established: 1977 (49 years ago)
- School district: Wake County Public School System
- Superintendent: Dr. Robert P. Taylor
- CEEB code: 344260
- Principal: Eric Bethiel
- Staff: 91.89 (FTE)
- Grades: 9–12
- Enrollment: 1,708 (2023–24)
- Student to teacher ratio: 18.74
- Classes offered: Arts, Engineering Systems, Health Sciences, Integrated Technology
- Language: English
- Schedule: Block, 4-period
- Hours in school day: Monday–Friday, 7:25am–2:18pm
- Colors: Blue and gold
- Fight song: The East Wake Fight Song
- Athletics: East Wake High School Athletics
- Mascot: Warrior
- Yearbook: The Shield
- Programs: AP, CTE
- Website: East Wake Magnet High School

East Wake iTech & Design Magnet High School (also known as East Wake High School) is a public high school located in Wendell, North Carolina, in the United States. It is part of the Wake County Public School System. The school serves the Wake County towns of Wendell and Zebulon as well as the surrounding unincorporated parts of eastern Wake County.

== Notable alumni ==
- Greg Ellis, former NFL defensive end from 1998–2009 and Pro Bowl selection in 2007
- Gregory Helms, professional wrestler in the WWE and WCW
- Darren Jackson, Democratic member of the North Carolina House of Representatives
- Johnny Perry, professional strongman competitor
