= Wendell, North Carolina =

Town in North Carolina

- Town
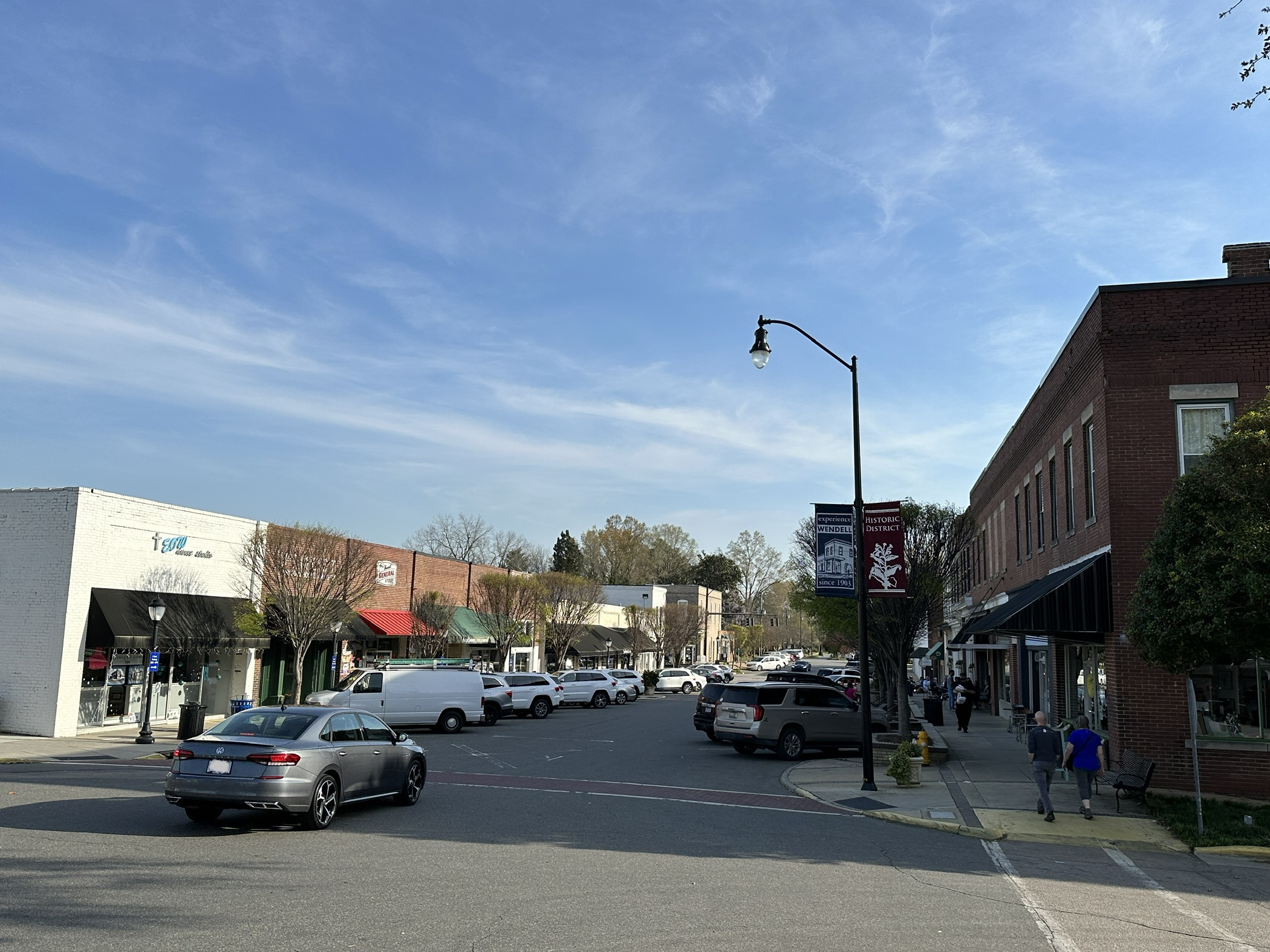
- Downtown Wendell on the corner of W. Campen St. and N. Main St. on March 24, 2023

- Seal Logo
- Motto: Small Town, Big Charm
- Interactive map of Wendell, North Carolina
- Location within North Carolina
- Coordinates: 35.7833°N 78.3887°W
- Country: United States
- State: North Carolina
- County: Wake
- Founded: 1850s
- Incorporated: March 6, 1903
- Named for: Oliver Wendell Holmes Sr.

Government
  - Type: Council–Manager
  - Mayor: Virginia Gray
  - Mayor Pro Tempore: Joe DeLoach
  - Town Manager: Marvin "Marc" E. Collins III
  - Commissioners: Deans Eatman; Braxton Honeycutt; Kate Benson; Dustin Ingalls

Area
  - Total: 10.013 sq mi (25.934 km^{2})
  - Land: 9.979 sq mi (25.846 km^{2})
  - Water: 0.034 sq mi (0.088 km^{2}) 0.34%
- Elevation: 305 ft (93 m)

Population (2020)
  - Total: 9,793
  - Estimate (2025): 19,687
  - Density: 981.3/sq mi (378.9/km^{2})
- Time zone: UTC–5 (Eastern (EST))
  - Summer (DST): UTC–4 (EDT)
- ZIP Code: 27591
- Area codes: 919 and 984
- FIPS code: 37-71860
- GNIS feature ID: 2406857
- Website: townofwendellnc.gov

Wendell (/wɛnˈdɛl/ wen-DEL) is a town in Wake County, North Carolina, United States. It is a satellite town of Raleigh, the state capital. The population was 9,793 as of the 2020 census, and was estimated at 19,687 in 2025.

== History ==
Incorporated on March 6, 1903, Wendell was settled in the 1850s, when farmers in Granville County were victims of a blight that came to be known as the Granville County Wilt. Their tobacco crops failed, and they chose to move to a new location with more fertile land for their crops.

As settlement increased, a small village took form. The villagers asked the local schoolteacher, M.A. Griffin, to choose a name. Griffin suggested they call it Wendell, in honor of his favorite poet, Oliver Wendell Holmes. However, the townspeople pronounce each syllable with equal emphasis, not as the poet's middle name is said. The Town seal was adopted on April 4, 1963.

The first post office was built in 1891, and has been restored by the Wendell Historical Society. The oldest institution in Wendell is Hephzibah Baptist Church, founded in 1809. The first newspaper was the Wendell Clarion, founded in 1911, which was succeeded by the Gold Leaf Farmer and currently the Eastern Wake News.

Wendell has four buildings and two districts that are listed on the National Register of Historic Places. These are the Dr. Thomas H. Avera House, Harmony Plantation, Riley Hill School, Sunnyside, Wendell Boulevard Historic District, and the Wendell Commercial Historic District.

In the 2020s, the town began experiencing a population surge due to proximity to Raleigh and increased demand for housing in the wake of the COVID-19 pandemic. This growth has led to numerous infrastructure and municipal projects, private developments and expansion of services across Wendell to keep up with the influx of people.

The town was the fastest-growing municipality in North Carolina in 2026 and the fourth fastest in the United States.

== Geography ==
According to the United States Census Bureau, the town has an area of 10.013 square miles (25.93 km^{2}), of which 9.979 square miles (25.85 km^{2}) is land and 0.034 square miles (0.09 km^{2}) (0.34%) is water.

Wendell is located in the northeast-central region of North Carolina, where the Piedmont and Atlantic Coastal Plain regions meet. This area is known as the "Fall Line" because it marks the elevation inland at which rapids and small waterfalls begin to appear in creeks and rivers. Its central Piedmont location situates Wendell approximately two hours (via car) north of Wilmington, two hours south of Richmond, two and a half hours west of Atlantic Beach and Nags Head and four hours east of the Great Smoky Mountains.

Adjacent to Wendell is the Lizard Lick community, which has a Wendell zip code and addresses and became notable for the Lizard Lick Towing reality series.

== Climate ==
Wendell enjoys a moderate subtropical climate, with moderate temperatures in the spring, fall, and winter. Summers are typically hot with high humidity. Winter highs generally range in the low 50s °F (10 to 13.2 °C) with lows in the low-to-mid 30s°F (-2 to 2 °C), although an occasional 60 °F (15 °C) or warmer winter day is not uncommon. Spring and fall days usually reach the low-to-mid 70s°F (low 20s°C), with lows at night in the lower 50s°F (10 to 14 °C). Summer daytime highs often reach the upper 80s to low 90s°F (29 to 35 °C). The rainiest months are July and August.

== Demographics ==
Historical population
Census	Pop.	Note	%±
1910	759		—
1920	1,239		63.2%
1930	980		−20.9%
1940	1,132		15.5%
1950	1,253		10.7%
1960	1,620		29.3%
1970	1,929		19.1%
1980	2,222		15.2%
1990	2,822		27.0%
2000	4,247		50.5%
2010	5,845		37.6%
2020	9,793		67.5%
2025 (est.)	19,687		101.0%
U.S. Decennial Census; 2020 Census

According to realtor website Zillow, the average price of a home as of September 30, 2026, in Wendell was $365,931.

As of the 2024 American Community Survey, there were 4,957 estimated households in Wendell with an average of 2.63 persons per household. The town has a median household income of $95,787. Approximately 3.2% of the town's population lives at or below the poverty line. Wendell has an estimated 72.5% employment rate, with 38.2% of the population holding a bachelor's degree or higher and 91.8% holding a high school diploma. There were 5,198 housing units at an average density of 520.89 per square mile (201.12/km^{2}).

The top five reported languages (people were allowed to report up to two languages, thus the figures will generally add to more than 100%) were English (81.5%), Spanish (14.9%), Indo-European (2.1%), Asian and Pacific Islander (0.6%), and Other (1.0%).

The median age in the town was 38.0 years.

Wendell, North Carolina – racial and ethnic composition Note: the US Census treats Hispanic/Latino as an ethnic category. This table excludes Latinos from the racial categories and assigns them to a separate category. Hispanics/Latinos may be of any race.
Race / ethnicity (NH = non-Hispanic)	Pop. 1990	Pop. 2000	Pop. 2010	Pop. 2020	% 1990	% 2000	% 2010	% 2020
White alone (NH)	2,486	2,894	3,211	4,925	88.09%	68.14%	54.94%	50.29%
Black or African American alone (NH)	315	1,011	1,743	2,564	11.16%	23.81%	29.82%	26.18%
Native American or Alaska Native alone (NH)	2	18	31	37	0.07%	0.42%	0.53%	0.38%
Asian alone (NH)	9	17	51	224	0.32%	0.40%	0.87%	2.29%
Pacific Islander alone (NH)	—	2	0	8	—	0.05%	0.00%	0.08%
Other race alone (NH)	0	10	8	64	0.00%	0.24%	0.14%	0.65%
Mixed race or multiracial (NH)	—	44	128	429	—	1.04%	2.19%	4.38%
Hispanic or Latino (any race)	10	251	673	1,542	0.35%	5.91%	11.51%	15.75%
Total	2,822	4,247	5,845	9,793	100.00%	100.00%	100.00%	100.00%

=== 2020 census ===
As of the 2020 census, there were 9,793 people, 3,644 households, and 2,607 families residing in the town. The population density was 1,700.17 inhabitants per square mile (656.44/km^{2}). There were 3,868 housing units at an average density of 671.53 per square mile (259.28/km^{2}). The racial makeup of the town was 52.29% White, 27.04% African American, 0.71% Native American, 2.33% Asian, 0.11% Pacific Islander, 9.30% from some other races and 8.21% from two or more races. Hispanic or Latino people of any race were 15.75% of the population.

=== 2010 census ===
As of the 2010 census, there were 5,845 people, 2,270 households, and _ families residing in the town. The population density was 1,123.17 inhabitants per square mile (433.66/km^{2}). There were 2,430 housing units at an average density of 466.95 per square mile (180.29/km^{2}). The racial makeup of the town was 58.08% White, 30.25% African American, 0.79% Native American, 0.89% Asian, 0.00% Pacific Islander, 6.76% from some other races and 3.23% from two or more races. Hispanic or Latino people of any race were 11.51% of the population.

=== 2000 census ===
As of the 2000 census, there were 4,247 people, 1,675 households, and 1,118 families residing in the town. The population density was 2,164.37 inhabitants per square mile (835.67/km^{2}). There were 1,785 housing units at an average density of 909.68 per square mile (351.23/km^{2}). The racial makeup of the town was 70.43% White, 24.06% African American, 0.42% Native American, 0.40% Asian, 0.05% Pacific Islander, 3.30% from some other races and 1.34% from two or more races. Hispanic or Latino people of any race were 5.91% of the population.

There were 1,675 households out of which 37.9% had children under the age of 18 living with them, 47.6% were married couples living together, 15.9% had a female householder with no husband present, and 33.2% were non-families. 29.0% of all households were made up of individuals and 13.6% had someone living alone who was 65 years of age or older. The average household size was 2.50 and the average family size was 3.07.

In the town the population was spread out with 29.4% under the age of 18, 6.6% from 18 to 24, 33.7% from 25 to 44, 17.8% from 45 to 64, and 12.5% who were 65 years of age or older. The median age was 34 years. For every 100 females there were 83.6 males. For every 100 females age 18 and over, there were 76.5 males.

The median income for a household in the town was $39,750, and the median income for a family was $47,077. Males had a median income of $35,668 versus $26,994 for females. The per capita income for the town was $17,772. 12.6% of the population and 8.6% of families were below the poverty line. Out of the total people living in poverty, 13.5% were under the age of 18 and 25.7% were 65 or older.

== Education ==
The town is served by five public schools, which are administered by the Wake County Public School System. They include Lake Myra Elementary, Carver Elementary School, Wendell Elementary School, Wendell Middle School and East Wake High School.

The town is home to two institutions of higher learning: Southeastern Free Will Baptist College, and the Eastern Wake Campus of Wake Technical Community College (Wake Tech), which opened in April 2024.

== Economy ==
Notable Wendell businesses include the Bearded Bee Brewing Company and the North American headquarters of Daedong-USA, the maker of Kioti tractors. Siemens houses a 272,000 square foot manufacturing facility bordering city limits that serves as the company's US headquarters for its Electrification and Automation (EA) business and employs local residents. The town's growth in the 2020s has spurred rapid commercial development in the Wendell Falls area and along the Wendell Falls Parkway and Wendell Boulevard corridors.

In 2025, work broke ground on the Wendell Commerce Center, a complex of multi-tenant warehouse buildings totaling nearly 1.8 million square feet of industrial space near the interchange of Interstate 87, Wendell Boulevard and Rolesville Road similar to existing properties in western Wake County and in Research Triangle Park.

== Transportation ==
=== Passenger ===
- Air: Wendell is served by Raleigh-Durham International Airport, which is located in northwestern Wake County on I-40, about 25 minutes from the town.
- Rail: Wendell was served by a passenger line between Raleigh and Wilson with stops in Knightdale, Zebulon, and Wendell, but was terminated in 1943. The railroad (Carolina Coastal Railway) still runs through downtown Wendell and is owned by Regional Rail LLC. Wendell is not served directly by passenger trains. The nearest Amtrak stations are in Raleigh and Selma.
- Local bus: GoTriangle operates the ZWX (Zebulon-Wendell Express) line that serves the area during rush hour for park and ride commuters, and connects to municipal bus systems in Raleigh, Durham, and Chapel Hill. GoRaleigh operates Route 33 that connects the New Hope area of Raleigh to Knightdale and Wendell's campus of Wake Tech (weekdays only to the campus) hourly.

=== Roads ===
- I-87 runs through the western portions of Wendell and has three exits serving the town: Wendell Falls Parkway (Exit 11), Wendell Boulevard/Knightdale Boulevard (Exit 13) and Rolesville Road (Exit 14, southbound only).
- US 64 and US 264 run concurrently along the Interstate 87 route and take over as the primary highway designations at Interstate 87's terminus at Rolesville Road, continuing east as an expressway towards Zebulon and serving Wendell via Exit 432 (Lizard Lick Road).
- US 64 Business (Wendell Boulevard) runs through Wendell from east to west as the main non-expressway arterial road between Raleigh and Zebulon.
- Other highways in the area include NC 97, and NC 231.
- Wendell Falls Parkway is the main arterial route for southwestern Wendell, running from the I-87 interchange to downtown Wendell, terminating at Wendell Boulevard. A portion of Wendell Falls Parkway was formerly the final few miles of Poole Road, a longstanding road between Wendell and Raleigh. The road serves the Wendell Falls community, one of the largest planned communities in North Carolina.

== Parks and recreation ==
The town is served by several recreational parks and facilities. They include Wendell Park, Hollybrook Park (opened in 2025), Wendell Community Center and J. Ashley Wall Town Square. Future additions include the Buffalo Creek Greenway, Main Street Greenway, Main Street Park, Carver Community Center at Pleasant Grove and smaller parks as part of neighborhood or commercial developments.

== Notable people ==
- BJ Barham, lead singer of American Aquarium (moved to town)
- Greg Ellis, NFL defensive end (born in town)
- Fred Marshall Henry "Snake", MLB first baseman (moved to town, possibly born)
- Lawson B. Knott Jr., administrator of the General Services Administration (born in town)
- George J. Laurer, inventor of the Universal Product Code (moved to town)
- Brian McGinnis, US Senate candidate, pro-Palestine activist (moved to town)
- Charlie Leland Rowland "Chuck", MLB catcher (moved to town)
- Gregory Walcott, film and television actor (born in town)

== Notable annual town events ==
- Wendell Fireworks Show: held July 2 annually
- Harvest Festival: takes place annually on the first Saturday in October
- International Food and Music Festival: held annually in September
- Wendell Wonderland: takes place annually on the first Friday in December
