= Top of the Hill Restaurant & Brewery =

Coordinates: 35°54′47″N 79°03′19″W

The Top of the Hill Restaurant, Brewery & Distillery
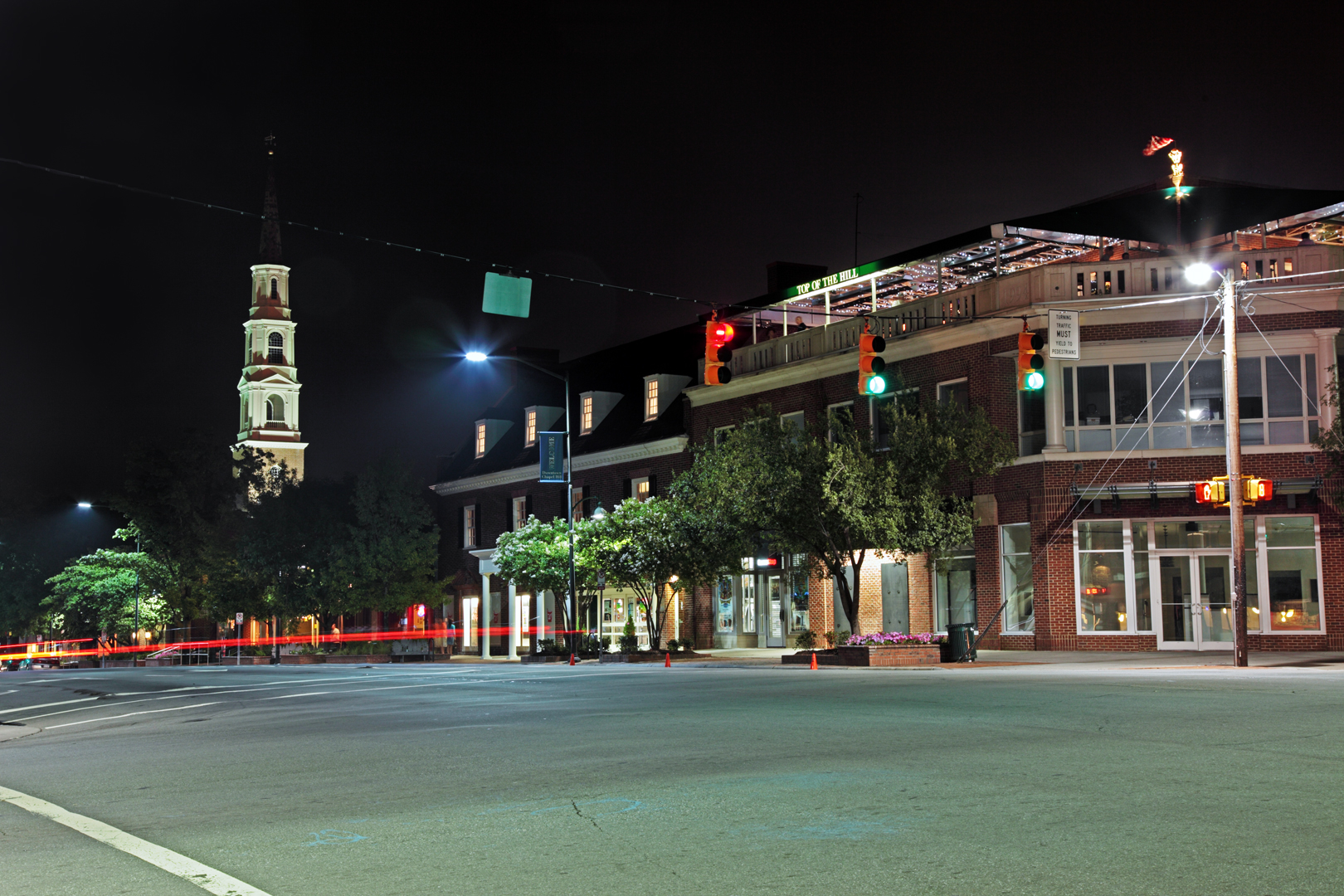
- Top of the Hill at the intersection of Franklin and Columbia Streets

Restaurant information
- Established: 1994
- Owner: Scott Maitland
- Food type: No distinct food style
- Dress code: Casual
- Location: 100 E. Franklin Street, Chapel Hill, NC
- Website: The Top of the Hill

Top of the Hill (TOPO) is a brewpub, restaurant, event space and distillery located in downtown Chapel Hill, North Carolina. The restaurant and brewery opened in 1994 at the intersection of Franklin and Columbia Streets adjacent to the University of North Carolina at Chapel Hill. It was one of the first microbreweries in the state. TOPO expanded in 2010, adding the Great Room event space and the Back Bar, which is home to North Carolina's first on-premise cask ale program.

TOPO Distillery opened in 2012 and produces the only 100% locally sourced and USDA certified organic spirits in the deep South: TOPO Organic Vodka, TOPO Organic Piedmont Gin and TOPO Moonshine Carolina Whiskey. All three organic spirits are made with 100% organic Carolina soft red winter wheat grown less than 100 miles from the distillery. The distillery is also located on Franklin Street, three blocks south in the former printing press room of the Chapel Hill News.

== History ==
Top of the Hill was founded in 1996 by Scott Maitland, then a law student studying at the University of North Carolina at Chapel Hill. Maitland became interested in an under-construction building at the intersection of Franklin and Columbia Streets after learning that a national restaurant chain, wanted to open a new location there. Fearing what he perceived as a potential stifling of Chapel Hill's local food and drink culture by corporate establishment, he partnered with Daniel Bradford, the editor of All About Beer Magazine, and John Withey, an experienced English brewer, to open a microbrewery.

Top of the Hill made additions to its original location in 2010, building the TOPO Great Room complex and TOPO Back Bar in an adjoining space formerly occupied by the Carolina Theater. In 2012, Top of the Hill opened their own organic spirits distillery three blocks south of the brewery, branding it TOPO.

== Facilities ==
=== Restaurant ===
TOPO Restaurant and Brewery overlooks downtown Chapel Hill and has extensive space for outdoor dining. The lunch, afternoon, and dinner menus feature a mix of Southern bistro fare. Local dining guides such as the Daily Tar Heel and the Independent Weekly continually award TOPO top dining and visiting honors such as the "Best Place to Watch ACC Basketball" as well as the "Best Outdoor Dining in Orange/Chatham County" (2009, 2010) and "Best Business Lunch" (2007) awards.

=== Brewery ===
Top of the Hill's brewery primarily specializes in English style ales, though it also makes a number of beers in other styles, including American lagers, wheat beers, Indian pale ales and stouts, many of which are named after famous Chapel Hill residents and landmarks. In 2004, Top of the Hill began canning beers to be sold off-site, making it the first microbrewery in North Carolina to do so. As the largest purchaser of alcohol in North Carolina, customers at Top of the Hill drink an average of sixty kegs of beer per week, making it one of the largest brewpubs in the United States in terms of volume of beer sold on site per square foot. The brewery is also home to the first cask ale program in the American south.

The beer brewed by Top of the Hill has earned top honors, including platinum, gold, silver and bronze medals at the Carolinas Championship of Beer. Internationally, Top of the Hill has won gold and silver medals at the World Beer Championships, and several of its beers have been declared among the world's best by the Beverage Tasting Institute.

=== Great Room and Back Bar ===
Back Bar is styled like a traditional bar or pub. The menu of the Back Bar consists of foods commonly served at sports bars, and is also where Top of the Hill's cask ale is served. Back Bar can also be used as an event space, either alone or in combination with the adjoining TOPO Great Room. The Great Room, is used for large events such as weddings and Greek life, as well as public occasions such as university events, corporate workshops, nationally known performers and international touring acts such as the National Theatre of Scotland.

=== Distillery ===
In lieu of expanding the micro-canning operation into a commercial brewery, Top of the Hill opened an organic distillery in 2012, branding it TOPO. It produces vodka, whiskey, and gin which are distributed in seven states. The distillery, which uses a fifth-generation still and copper kettle sources its organic ingredients from an organic wheat farm in Scotland Neck, North Carolina. Southern Wine and Spirits distributes the spirits in North Carolina, Mississippi, and South Carolina. The spirits are also available in Missouri, Maryland, Washington DC and Delaware.

== Reputation within Chapel Hill ==
In Spring 2012, seniors at UNC Chapel Hill voted proprietor Scott Maitland, also an adjunct professor at the Kenan-Flagler Business School, to present "The Last Lecture" at UNC Chapel Hill, signifying Top of the Hill's popularity and importance to both the school and Chapel Hill.
