= Green Man Brewery (Asheville) =

- Industry: Alcoholic beverage
- Founded: 1997
- Headquarters: Asheville, North Carolina, USA
- Products: Beer
- Production output: 13000 Barrels (as of 2015)

Green Man Brewery is a craft beer brewery in Asheville, North Carolina. It is Asheville's second officially established brewery.

== History ==
Green Man Brewery was started in 1997 in the brew pub Jack of the Wood in downtown Asheville. Initially brewed in dairy tanks at the brewery's inception, the operations were relocated to a new brewery and connected taproom nicknamed "Dirty Jack's" in 2005, located in the South Slope area of Downtown Asheville, Buxton Avenue. Ownership switched from Joe Eckert to the current owner in 2010, while original brewer John Stuart continued to brew for Green Man after the change in owners. As the company's distribution footprint widened and popularity of Green Man's beers rose, the production abilities needed to be scaled up. An upgrade in 2006 saw production grow from 7bbl to 14bbl, and was later redoubled in 2012 to a 30 bbl brewhouse. In 2015, expansion continued with the addition of an 18,000 ft^{2} bottling line, packaging, and shipping facility. In addition, there is also a 3,000 ft^{2} beer garden in this new facility.

== Beers ==
The year-round flagship beers offered by Green Man are their ESB, IPA, and Porter. Green Man's flagship beers are their own take on traditional English styles, made with imported English malt; the beers are not pasteurized. Offered alongside the English styled flagship beers are a rotating line-up of seasonals, such as Rambler, Harvester, Leaf Blower, Wayfarer, and Forester. Special limited releases happen throughout the year, including beers from Green Man's Barrel program. The brewery has also had specialty programs such as a featured historical series that offered recipes from 1850 to 1915.

Greenman's Beers
Name	Style	ABV %	IBU	Notes
IPA	India Pale Ale	6.2	63	Year-round
ESB	English Bitter	5.5	32	Year-round
Porter	Porter	6.0	40	Year-round
Rambler	Pale Ale	5.5	45	Seasonal
Harvester	Marzen	6.0	30	Seasonal
Leaf Blower	Red India Pale Ale	6.2	67	Seasonal
Wayfarer	India Pale Ale	6.0	70	Seasonal
Forester	Stout	6.0	60	Seasonal
The Rainmaker	Double IPA	9.3	158	Limited Release
Holly King	Holiday Ale	11.0	75	Limited Release
The Dweller	Imperial Stout	10.0	65	Limited Release

== Distribution Footprint ==
Green Man's beers are distributed in North Carolina, South Carolina, Tennessee, and as of 2015, Florida, and most currently Georgia and Virginia. In 2019 Mississippi was added and Alabama is scheduled for 2020.

== Taproom ==
Green Man taprooms offer the brewery's flagship, seasonal, limited and special releases, as well as one-off beers. Green Man hosts 2 separate tap rooms, Dirty Jack's and The Mansion. Dirty Jack's, located at 23 Buxton Avenue, is a dog friendly brewery with British pub stylings, including a long wooden bar, darts, and soccer matches playing on the televisions on the walls. The Mansion, located at 27 Buxton Avenue, is also dog friendly and offers 2 levels of seating with a merchandise shop and bar on the main floor, and a larger bar on the 3rd floor with a covered patio and multiple TVs.

== Festival Participation ==
Green Man participates in local, regional, and out of state beer festivals, where their beers have earned acclaim and awards. The Forester Stout earned a silver medal and the Porter won a bronze at the World Beer Championship.
