= WAUG =

WAUG may refer to:

- WAUG (AM), a radio station (750 AM) licensed to New Hope, North Carolina, United States
- WAUG-LD, a low-power television station (channel 4, virtual 8) licensed to Raleigh, North Carolina
- WFAM, a radio station (1050 AM) licensed to Augusta, Georgia which held the call sign WAUG from 1952 to 1978
- WLUB, a radio station (105.7 FM) licensed to Augusta, Georgia which held the call sign WAUG-FM from 1952 to 1980
- West African University Games
