= Halls Crossroads, North Carolina =

Unincorporated community in North Carolina, US

Halls Crossroads
- unincorporated community
- Location in North Carolina
- Coordinates: 36.0800°N 78.4500°W
- Country: United States
- State: North Carolina
- County: Franklin
- Elevation: 302 ft (92 m)
- Time zone: UTC-5 (Eastern (EST))
  - Summer (DST): UTC-4 (EDT)
- Area code: 919

Halls Crossroads is an unincorporated community in south central Franklin County, North Carolina, United States.

It is located north of Bunn, at an elevation of 302 feet (92 m). The primary cross roads where the community is located are: N.C. Highway 39, Pearces Road (SR 1001) and Ferrells Bridge Road (SR 1001).
