= North Carolina Highway 222 =

State highway in North Carolina, US

North Carolina Highway 222

- Route of NC 222 highlighted in red

Route information
- Maintained by NCDOT
- Length: 57.8 mi (93.0 km)
- Existed: 1934–present

Major junctions
- West end: NC 231 near Emit
- US 301 in Kenly; I-795 in Fremont; US 117 in Fremont; US 264 Alt. in Saratoga; I-587 / US 264 near Saratoga; US 258 in Fountain
- East end: NC 33 in Belvoir

Location
- Country: United States
- State: North Carolina
- Counties: Johnston, Wayne, Wilson, Pitt

Highway system
- North Carolina Highway System; Interstate; US; State; Scenic
← US 221	→ NC 225

North Carolina Highway 222 (NC 222) is a primary state highway in the U.S. state of North Carolina. The highway traverses between Emit and Belvoir, connecting the rural towns of Kenly, Fremont, Eureka, Stantonsburg, Saratoga, Fountain, and Falkland.

== Route description ==
NC 222 is a two-lane rural highway that traverses 57.8 miles (93.0 km) through mostly farmland in eastern North Carolina. Beginning at NC 231 east of Emit, it travels southeast towards Kenly, passing by Aycock Birthplace along the way. At Kenly, it goes east to Fremont connecting with Interstate 795 (I-795) and US 117 there. Heading northeast, it goes through Eureka and Stantonsburg, reaching I-587 and US 264 near Saratoga. Heading easterly, it connects with US 258 in Fountain. After Falkland, NC 222 ends at NC 33 in Belvoir.

== History ==
NC 222 was established in 1934 traversing between US 301/NC 22 in Kenly, to NC 58 near Lindell. In 1938, NC 222 was rerouted at Eureka to NC 58 in Stantonsburg; its old alignment was downgraded to secondary roads. In 1948, NC 222 was extended west on new primary routing to NC 42; the following year it extended again to its current western terminus at NC 231. Between 1963-1968, NC 222 was rerouted through Stantonsburg. In 1978, NC 222 was extended east to NC 33 in Belvoir.

== Junction list ==
County	Location	mi	km	Destinations	Notes
Johnston		0.0	0.0	NC 231 – Wendell, Middlesex	
Johnston	Stancils Chapel	3.9	6.3	NC 42 – Clayton, Wilson	
Johnston	Kenly	11.5	18.5	US 301 (Church Street) to I-95 – Wilson, Smithfield	
Wayne	Aycock	16.6	26.7	NC 581 – Goldsboro, Spring Hope	
Wayne		20.4	32.8	I-795 – Goldsboro, Mount Olive, Wilson	Exit 14 (I-795)
Wayne	Fremont	21.2	34.1	US 117 north (Wilson Street) – Wilson	North end of US 117 overlap
Wayne	Fremont	21.3	34.3	US 117 south (Wilson Street) – Pikeville, Goldsboro	South end of US 117 overlap
Wayne		25.9	41.7	NC 111 south – Goldsboro, Beulaville	South end of NC 111 overlap
Wilson	Stantonsburg	33.5	53.9	NC 58 north (Moyton Drive) – Wilson	North end of NC 58 overlap
Wilson	Stantonsburg	33.8	54.4	NC 58 south (Moyton Drive) – Snow Hill	South end of NC 58 overlap
Wilson	Saratoga	38.0	61.2	US 264 (Main Street) – Farmville, Wilson	
Wilson		39.1	62.9	I-587 – Farmville, Wilson	Exit 53 (I-587)
Wilson		39.3	63.2	NC 111 north (Good News Church Road) – Macclesfield	North end of NC 111 overlap
Pitt	Fountain	46.8	75.3	US 258 (Railroad Street) – Farmville, Tarboro	
Pitt	Falkland	54.7	88.0	NC 43 north (Main Street) – Pinetops	North end of NC 43 overlap
Pitt		55.6	89.5	NC 43 south – Greenville	South end of NC 43 overlap
Pitt	Belvoir	57.8	93.0	NC 33 – Greenville, Tarboro	
1.000 mi = 1.609 km; 1.000 km = 0.621 mi
