= Seven Paths, North Carolina =

Unincorporated community in North Carolina, US

Coordinates: 35°59′52″N 78°11′01″W

Seven Paths is an unincorporated community in southeastern Franklin County, North Carolina, United States.

It is located at the intersection of Seven Paths Road (SR 1002) and Sykes Road (SR 1629, SR 1636), northeast of Bunn, at an elevation of 312 feet (95 m).
