= Stallings Crossroads, North Carolina =

Unincorporated community in North Carolina, US

Coordinates: 36°05′39″N 78°09′55″W

Stallings Crossroads is an unincorporated community in eastern Franklin County, North Carolina, United States. It is located east of Louisburg, at an elevation of 384 feet (117 m). The primary cross roads where the community is located are N.C. Highway 56, Fire Tower Road (SR 1002) and Edward Best Road (SR 1002).
