= Lake Royale, North Carolina =

- Census-designated place
- Location within the state of North Carolina Lake; Royale (the United States)
- Coordinates: 35°58′00″N 78°11′45″W
- Country: United States
- State: North Carolina
- County: Franklin

Area
  - Total: 7.05 sq mi (18.25 km^{2})
  - Land: 6.51 sq mi (16.86 km^{2})
  - Water: 0.54 sq mi (1.39 km^{2})
- Elevation: 187 ft (57 m)

Population (2020)
  - Total: 3,392
  - Density: 521.1/sq mi (201.19/km^{2})
- Time zone: UTC-5 (Eastern (EST))
  - Summer (DST): UTC-4 (EDT)
- Area codes: 919, 984 and 252
- FIPS code: 37-36513
- GNIS feature ID: 2584323

Lake Royale is a census-designated place (CDP) in southeastern Franklin County, North Carolina, United States. The population was 3,392 at the 2020 census.

It is a gated resort community which surrounds a man-made lake with the same name. The main entrance to Lake Royale is off Sledge Road (SR 1611), 3 miles (5 km) east of Bunn.

== Geography ==
Lake Royale is located in southeastern Franklin County. The residential community that comprises the CDP surrounds Lake Royale, a reservoir on Cypress Creek and a tributary of the Tar River. The southeastern border of the CDP follows the Franklin County/Nash County line.

According to the United States Census Bureau, the CDP has a total area of 7.0 square miles (18.1 km^{2}), of which 6.4 square miles (16.7 km^{2}) is land and 0.54 square miles (1.4 km^{2}), or 7.69%, is water.

== Demographics ==
Historical population
Census	Pop.	Note	%±
2020	3,392		—
U.S. Decennial Census

=== 2020 census ===
As of the 2020 census, Lake Royale had a population of 3,392. The median age was 52.4 years. 16.0% of residents were under the age of 18 and 26.7% of residents were 65 years of age or older. For every 100 females there were 93.1 males, and for every 100 females age 18 and over there were 90.8 males age 18 and over.

86.7% of residents lived in urban areas, while 13.3% lived in rural areas.

There were 1,569 households in Lake Royale, including 1,035 families. Of all households, 20.2% had children under the age of 18 living in them, 53.6% were married-couple households, 17.3% were households with a male householder and no spouse or partner present, and 23.1% were households with a female householder and no spouse or partner present. About 28.6% of all households were made up of individuals and 12.3% had someone living alone who was 65 years of age or older.

There were 2,489 housing units, of which 37.0% were vacant. The homeowner vacancy rate was 5.2% and the rental vacancy rate was 11.9%.

Lake Royale racial composition
Race	Number	Percentage
White (non-Hispanic)	2,684	79.13%
Black or African American (non-Hispanic)	397	11.7%
Native American	20	0.59%
Asian	18	0.53%
Other/Mixed	135	3.98%
Hispanic or Latino	138	4.07%

=== 2010 census ===
As of the census of 2010, there were 2,506 people, 1,066 households, and 762 families residing in the CDP. The population density was 385.5 people per square mile (148.8 people/km^{2}). The racial makeup of the CDP was 82.1% White, 14.5% African American, 0.7% Native American, 0.5% Asian, 0.0% Pacific Islander, 0.6% from other races, and 1.6% from two or more races. Hispanic or Latino of any race were 2.3% of the population.

There were 1,066 households, out of which 24.1% had children under the age of 18 living with them, 60.2% were married couples living together, 8.1% had a female householder with no husband present, and 28.5% were non-families. 23.3% of all households were made up of individuals, and 7.1% had someone living alone who was 65 years of age or older. The average household size was 2.35 and the average family size was 2.77.

In the CDP, the population was spread out, with 22.3% under the age of 20, 3.9% from 20 to 24, 23.7% from 25 to 44, 25.3% from 45 to 64, and 15.9% who were 65 years of age or older. The median age was 45.0 years. For every 100 females, there were 101.9 males. For every 100 females age 18 and over, there were 97.4 males.

The median income for a household in the CDP was $44,019, and the median income for a family was $43,750. Males had a median income of $44,286 versus $34,803 for females. The per capita income for the CDP was $25,752. About 2.2% of families and 6.3% of the population were below the poverty line, including 9.7% of those under age 18 and 6.6% of those age 65 or over.

=== Housing ===
There were 2,094 housing units at an average density of 322.2 per square mile (124.4/km^{2}). 49.1% of housing units were vacant.

There were 1,066 occupied housing units in the CDP. 896 were owner-occupied units (84.1%), while 170 were renter-occupied (15.9%). The homeowner vacancy rate was 6.3% of total units. The rental unit vacancy rate was 7.5%.
