= Katesville, North Carolina =

Unincorporated community in North Carolina, US

Coordinates: 36°05′21″N 78°21′57″W

Katesville is an unincorporated community in west central Franklin County, North Carolina, United States.

It is located near the intersection of N.C. Highway 56 and Phelps Road (SR 1223), west of Louisburg, at an elevation of 351 feet (107 m).
