= Stancils Chapel, North Carolina =

Unincorporated community in North Carolina, US

Coordinates: 35°40′53″N 78°12′35″W

Stancils Chapel is an unincorporated community in Johnston County, North Carolina, United States, situated on North Carolina Highway 42 and North Carolina Highway 222, east-southeast of Emit. It lies at an elevation of 240 feet (73 m).
