= North Carolina Highway 231 =

State highway in North Carolina, US

North Carolina Highway 231
- NC 231 highlighted in red

Route information
- Maintained by NCDOT
- Length: 25.4 mi (40.9 km)
- Existed: 1935–present

Major junctions
- South end: US 64 Bus. in Wendell
- US 264 near Middlesex; US 64 near Spring Hope
- North end: US 64 Alt. / NC 98 near Spring Hope

Location
- Country: United States
- State: North Carolina
- Counties: Wake, Johnston, Nash

Highway system
- North Carolina Highway System; Interstate; US; State; Scenic
← NC 226A	→ I-240

North Carolina Highway 231 (NC 231) is a 25.4-mile-long (40.9 km) primary state highway in the U.S. state of North Carolina. NC 231 travels through Wake County, Johnston County, and Nash County between its southern terminus at US 64 Business in Wendell and its northern terminus at US 64 Alternate/NC 98 near Spring Hope. Throughout Wake County and Johnston County, NC 231 primarily follows a southeast–northwest alignment. Entering into Nash County, NC 231 turns to follow a northerly alignment until reaching its northern terminus. NC 231 serves the towns of Wendell, Middlesex, and Spring Hope.

NC 231 was first established in 1926 running between Elizabethtown and Delco in Southeastern North Carolina. By 1929, NC 21 was extended southwest along the route of NC 231 and the highway was decommissioned. Modern-day NC 231 was established in 1935, between NC 39 in Emit and US 64 west of Spring Hope. In 1948, NC 231 was extended west along its current routing to US 64 in Wendell. With the exception of a minor realignment in 1978, the routing of NC 231 has remained the same since.

== Route description ==
NC 231 is a two-lane rural highway that traverses 25.4 miles (40.9 km) from Wendell to near Spring Hope; making a "J" shape on a map.

The southern terminus of NC 231 is located at an intersection with US 64 Business (Wendell Boulevard), Old Wilson Road, and Selma Road east of downtown Wendell. From the intersection, NC 231 heads south along Selma Road, crossing over a railroad operated by the Carolina Coastal Railway. NC 231 runs through a residential area of southern Wendell before leaving the town to the southeast. The highway follows Selma Road for 1.6 miles (2.6 km) until crossing into Johnston County. NC 231 continues for 0.2 miles (0.32 km) along Selma Road in Johnston County before reaching a T-intersection. At the intersection, NC 231 turns east toward Hocutts Crossroads. NC 231 primarily runs through a rural area with sporadic residential neighborhoods, farms, and forested areas. The highway approaches Hocutts Crossroads from the northwest and passes adjacent to Corinth-Holders Elementary School. NC 231 meets NC 96 at an all-way stop in Hocutts Crossroads. Beyond the intersection, NC 231 turns to follow an easterly and later northeasterly direction toward Emit. The highway crosses the Little River, a tributary of the Neuse River between Hocutts Crossroads and Emit. NC 231 enters the unincorporated community of Emit from the west, intersecting NC 39 at an all-way stop. NC 231 exits the community to the east but quickly turns to the southeast. The highway intersects the western terminus of NC 222 at a four-way intersection located 1.6 miles (2.6 km) east of Emit. NC 231 continues east for 2.3 miles (3.7 km) before entering into Nash County.

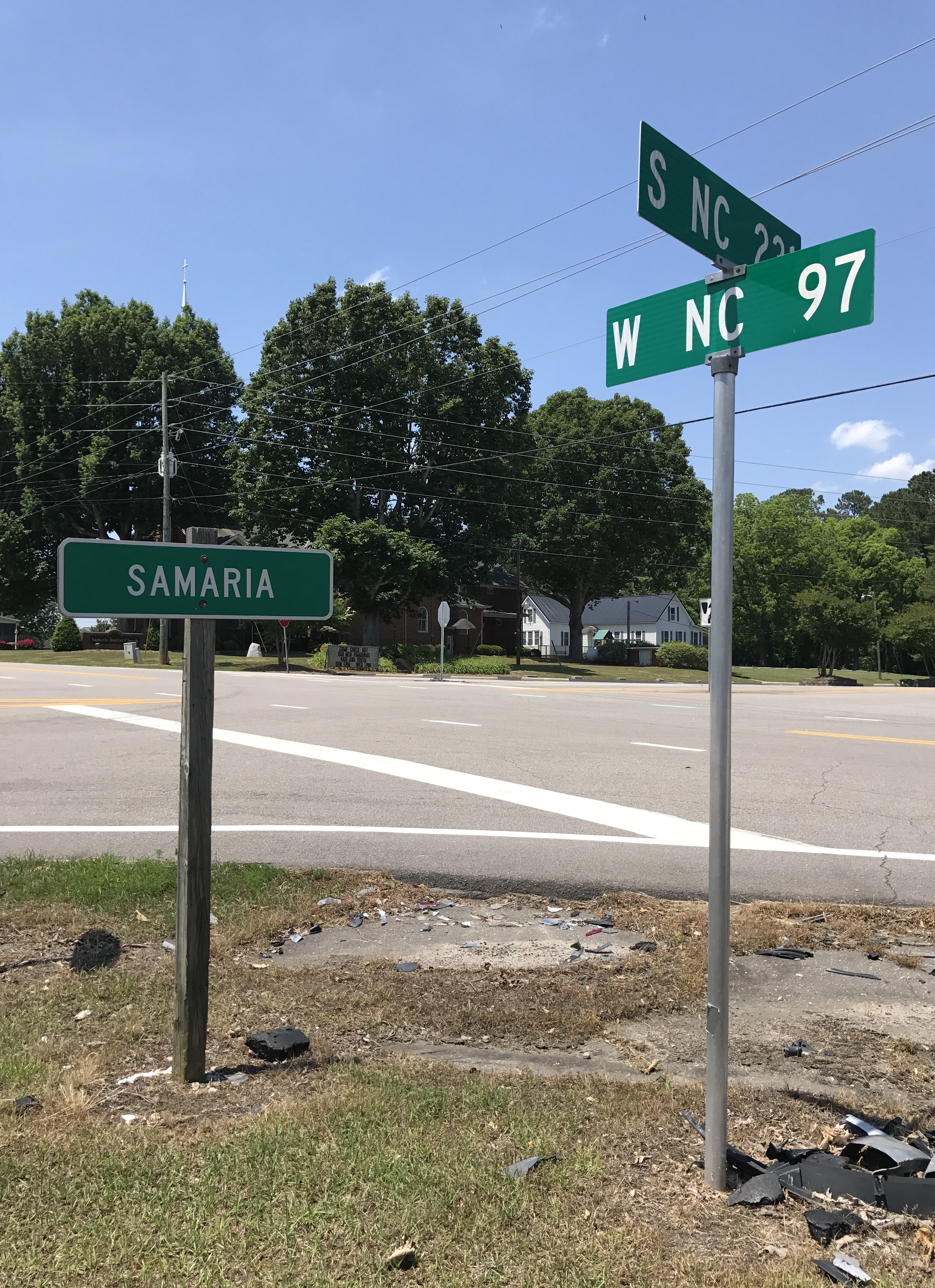
NC 231 at an intersection with NC 97 in Samaria

Immediately east of the Nash County line, NC 231 crosses Moccasin Creek which drains into the Buckhorn Reservoir. NC 231 also makes an immediate turn northward, an orientation it largely maintains for the remainder of the route. Approaching Middlesex from the south, the road name changes to Nash Street. NC 231 runs through a largely residential area of southern Middlesex until approaching the central business area of the town. North of the central business district, NC 231 crosses a railroad owned by the Carolina Coastal Railway at an at-grade crossing and intersects US 264 Alternate at Finch Avenue. NC 231 continues north until approaching Rockside Road where it makes a turn to the northeast and exits Middlesex. The highway meets US 264 at a diamond interchange northeast of Middlesex. Beginning at the interchange, NC 231 makes a slow turn to the north, largely paralleling Turkey Creek, located to the east. NC 231 makes a reverse curve beginning at Nade Road, giving the highway a brief easterly alignment. Continuing north for 1.6 miles (2.6 km), NC 231 enters the unincorporated community of Samaria from the south. NC 231 intersects NC 97 in Samaria, before continuing north of the community. North of Samaria, NC 231 crosses Turkey Creek and continues northward. Near Burgess Road, NC 231 makes a turn slightly to the northeast, a direction it follows until reaching US 64. NC 231 meets US 64 at a diamond interchange southwest of Spring Hope. US 64 Alternate begins at the interchange and the two highways run concurrently for 0.2 miles (0.32 km) to the north. The northern terminus of NC 231 is located at a T-intersection with NC 98 and US 64 Alternate west of Spring Hope.

The North Carolina Department of Transportation (NCDOT) measures average daily traffic volumes along many of the roadways it maintains. In 2016, average daily traffic volumes along NC 231 varied from 780 vehicles per day north of the Johnston County-Nash County line to 3,500 vehicles per day east of the Wendell Road intersection in Johnston County. No section of NC 231 is included with the National Highway System, a network of highways in the United States which serve strategic transportation facilities. However, the highway does connect to the National Highway System at US 264 in Middlesex and US 64 near Spring Hope.

== History ==
=== Previous designation ===
North Carolina Highway 231
- Location: Elizabethtown–Delco, NC
- Length: 33 mi (53 km)
- Existed: 1926–1929

NC 231 first appeared on North Carolina state transportation maps in 1926, running from NC 21/NC 23 in Elizabethtown to NC 20 in Delco. NC 231 followed an unimproved road which ran in a southwest–northeast orientation between Elizabethtown and Acme. In Acme, the highway turned to the south, crossed a railroad owned by the Seaboard Air Line Railroad before intersecting NC 20 in Delco. NC 231 paralleled the Cape Fear River for nearly its entire routing. By 1929, NC 21 was extended southeast from Elizabethtown to Delco, and NC 231 was decommissioned. Today, much of the highway is a part of NC 87.

=== Current designation ===
By 1930, secondary roads were established along much of the future routing of NC 231 between Wendell and NC 90 (modern-day US 64 Alternate) west of Spring Hope. The segments of NC 231 in Wake County and Nash County were gravel or topsoil roads, while the segment in Johnson County was a graded road. NC 231 first appeared on North Carolina state transportation maps in 1935, replacing secondary roads between NC 39 in Emit to US 64, west of Spring Hope. NC 231 remained a gravel or topsoil road until 1948, when the entire route was paved. In 1949, NC 231 was extended 7.9 miles (12.7 km) to the west from NC 39 in Emit to US 64 in Wendell. Prior to 1978, NC 231 made a northeasterly turn near its northern terminus, meeting US 64 0.3 miles (0.48 km) east of its current northern terminus. Following the completion of the US 64 freeway in 1978, NC 231 was shifted west along its current alignment to meet US 64 at an interchange and end at an intersection at NC 98/US 64 Alternate. The former alignment of NC 231 became Jernigan Road and Cox Road.

== Junction list ==
County	Location	mi	km	Destinations	Notes
Wake	Wendell	0.0	0.0	US 64 Bus. (Wendell Boulevard) – Knightdale, Zebulon	Southern terminus
Johnston	Hocutts Crossroads	5.5	8.9	NC 96 – Selma, Zebulon	
Johnston	Emit	7.9	12.7	NC 39 – Selma, Bunn	
Johnston		9.5	15.3	NC 222 east – Kenly	Western terminus of NC 222
Nash	Middlesex	15.3	24.6	US 264 Alt. (Finch Avenue) – Bailey, Zebulon	
Nash		16.4	26.4	US 264 – Wilson, Raleigh	
Nash	Samaria	21.0	33.8	NC 97 – Rocky Mount, Zebulon	
Nash		25.2	40.6	US 64 / US 64 Alt. begins – Rocky Mount, Raleigh	West end of US 64 Alt overlap
Nash		25.4	40.9	US 64 Alt. east / NC 98 west – Spring Hope, Wake Forest	Northern terminus; East end of US 64 Alt overlap
1.000 mi = 1.609 km; 1.000 km = 0.621 mi: Concurrency terminus
