= Riley, North Carolina =

Unincorporated community in North Carolina, US

Coordinates: 35°55′54″N 78°21′11″W

Riley is an unincorporated community in southern Franklin County, North Carolina, United States, near the Wake County line. It is located west-southwest of Bunn, at an elevation of 387 feet (118 m). The primary cross roads where the community is located are Pilot-Riley Road (SR 1103), Bethlehem Church Road (SR 1103) and Old Halifax Road (SR 1720).
