= Sutton, North Carolina =

Unincorporated community in North Carolina, US

Coordinates: 35°55′40″N 78°15′40″W

Sutton is an unincorporated community in southern Franklin County, North Carolina, United States. It is located at the intersection of N.C. Highway 39 and Brantleytown Road (SR 1720), south of Bunn, at an elevation of 187 feet (57 m).
