= Baker Farm (Bunn, North Carolina) =

Historic house in North Carolina, United States

- U.S. National Register of Historic Places
- Location within North Carolina Location within the United States
- Location: SW of Bunn on SR 1720, near Bunn, North Carolina
- Coordinates: 35°56′50″N 78°18′40″W
- Area: 235 acres (95 ha)
- Built: 1856
- Architectural style: Greek Revival
- NRHP reference No.: 82001297
- Added to NRHP: October 5, 1982

Baker Farm, also known as Perdue Farm, is a historic home and farm complex located near Bunn, Franklin County, North Carolina. The house was built in the first quarter of the 19th century and renovated in 1856 in the Greek Revival style. It is a two-story, three bay frame dwelling with a late-19th century two-story rear wing. Also on the property are 10 contributing outbuildings including a smokehouse, wash house, two barns, a storage shed, and three tobacco barns.

It was listed on the National Register of Historic Places in 1982.
