= Pearces, North Carolina =

Unincorporated community in North Carolina, US

Coordinates: 35°55′00″N 78°18′25″W

Pearces is an unincorporated community in southern Franklin County, North Carolina, United States.

It is located southwest of Bunn, at an elevation of 354 feet (108 m). The primary cross roads where the community is located are Pearces Road (SR 1001), Perry Road (SR 1721) and Adna Pearce Road (SR 1726).
