= Hocutts Crossroads, North Carolina =

Unincorporated community in North Carolina, US

Coordinates: 35°44′01″N 78°17′52″W

Hocutts Crossroads (also Corinth-Holder) is an unincorporated community in Johnston County, North Carolina, United States, centered at the intersection of North Carolina Highway 96 and North Carolina Highway 231, north of Emit. It lies at an elevation of 312 feet (95 m).
