= Andrews-Moore House =

Historic house in North Carolina, United States

- U.S. National Register of Historic Places
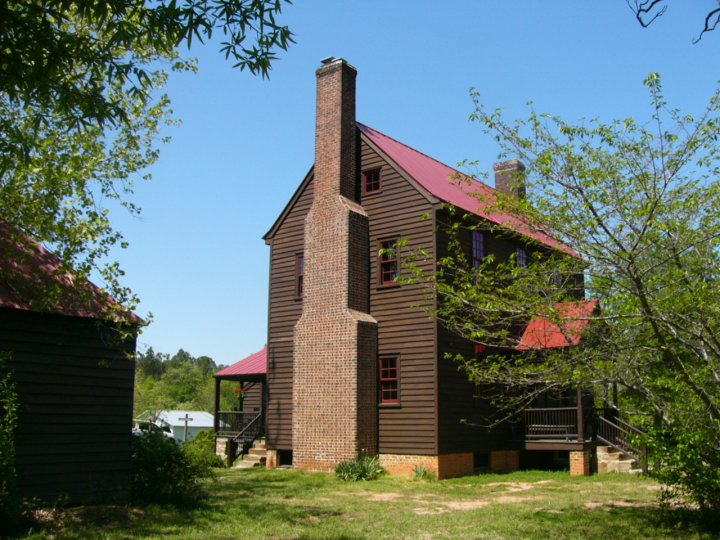

- Location within North Carolina Location within the United States
- Location: 95 Simon Collie Road, near Bunn, North Carolina
- Coordinates: 36°0′9″N 78°11′14″W
- Area: 17 acres (6.9 ha)
- Built: c. 1790, c. 1830
- Architectural style: Georgian
- NRHP reference No.: 98001506
- Added to NRHP: December 10, 1998

The Andrews-Moore House is a historic plantation house located near Bunn, Franklin County, North Carolina.

The house was built by tobacco farmer William Andrews to be the home for his wife, daughter and himself. It was erected in two sections about 1780 and 1830, and was a large 2 1/2-story, Georgian-style timber frame dwelling with a one-story rear ell. It features two exquisite double paved-shouldered chimneys.

It was listed on the National Register of Historic Places in 1998. After a recent restoration, the house caught on fire on March 29, 2006, destroying much of the building. The house was sold in 2010 to new owners, who launched a restoration effort.
