= Needham Yancey Gulley =

American politician (1855–1945)

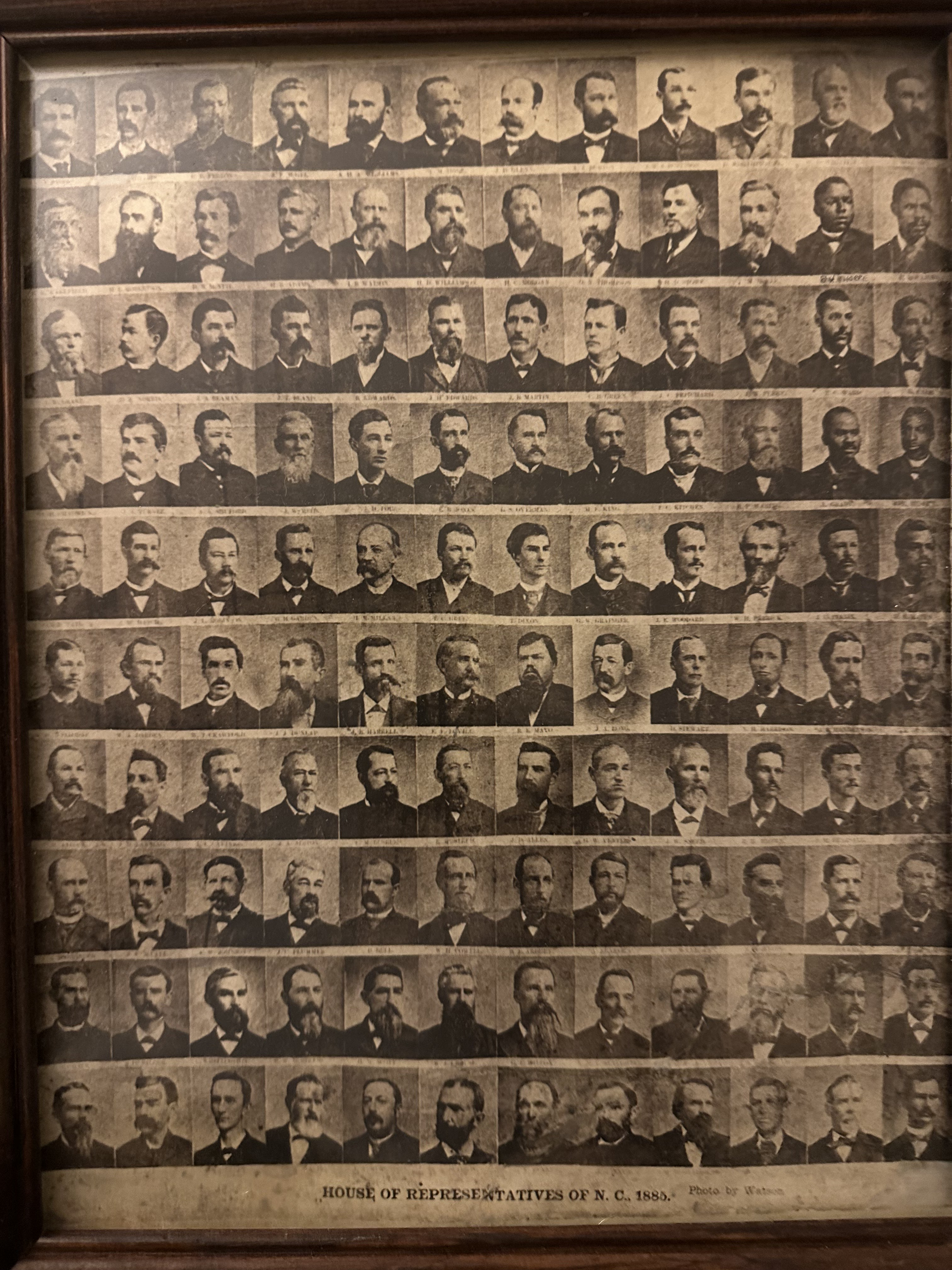
Members of the North Carolina House of Representatives in 1885

Needham Yancey Gulley (1855–1945) was an educator, lawyer, law school founder, and state legislator in North Carolina. He represented Franklin County in the North Carolina House of Representatives in 1885. He married and had six children. He wrote a chapter of the Cyclopedia of Law and Procedure.

He was a native of Johnston County. He graduated from Wake Forest College. He founded the Wake Forest College Department of Law.

He resided at 340 North Main Street.
