= Mapleville =

Mapleville is a place name in the United States:

- Mapleville, Maryland, in Washington County
- Mapleville, North Carolina, in Franklin County
- Mapleville, Rhode Island, in Providence County
