= Margaret, North Carolina =

Unincorporated community in North Carolina, US

Coordinates: 36°01′30″N 78°13′34″W

Margaret is an unincorporated community in eastern Franklin County, North Carolina, United States.

It is located northeast of Bunn, at an elevation of 322 feet (98 m). The primary cross roads where the community is located are Sledge Road (SR 1611), Ferrells Bridge Road (SR 1001) and Mort Harris Road (SR 1001).
