= Pilot, Franklin County, North Carolina =

Human settlement in United States

Coordinates: 35°53′06″N 78°15′54″W

Pilot is an unincorporated community in southern Franklin County, North Carolina, United States.

It is located at the intersection of N.C. Highway 39 and Old U.S. Highway 64 (SR 1770), south of Bunn at an elevation of 354 feet (108 m).
