= Five Points, Franklin County, North Carolina =

Unincorporated community in North Carolina, US

Coordinates: 35°57′44″N 78°17′28″W

Five Points is an unincorporated community in southern Franklin County, North Carolina, United States. It is located west of Bunn, at an elevation of 282 feet (86 m). The primary cross roads where the community is located are N.C. Highway 98, Pearces Road (SR 1001) and John Winstead Road (SR 1717).
