= North Carolina Highway 581 =

State highway in North Carolina, US

North Carolina Highway 581

- Route of NC 581 highlighted in red

Route information
- Maintained by NCDOT
- Length: 72.1 mi (116.0 km)
- Existed: 1933–present

Major junctions
- South end: NC 111 in Goldsboro
- US 13 / US 117 in Goldsboro; US 70 in Goldsboro; I-42 in Goldsboro; US 301 in Kirbys Crossing; US 264 in Bailey; US 64 in Spring Hope
- North end: US 401 / NC 39 / NC 56 in Louisburg

Location
- Country: United States
- State: North Carolina
- Counties: Wayne, Wilson, Nash, Franklin

Highway system
- North Carolina Highway System; Interstate; US; State; Scenic
← NC 561	→ US 601

North Carolina Highway 581 (NC 581) is a primary state highway in the U.S. state of North Carolina. The highway travels from Goldsboro to Louisburg, connecting various rural communities in between.

== Route description ==
=== Dedicated and memorial names ===
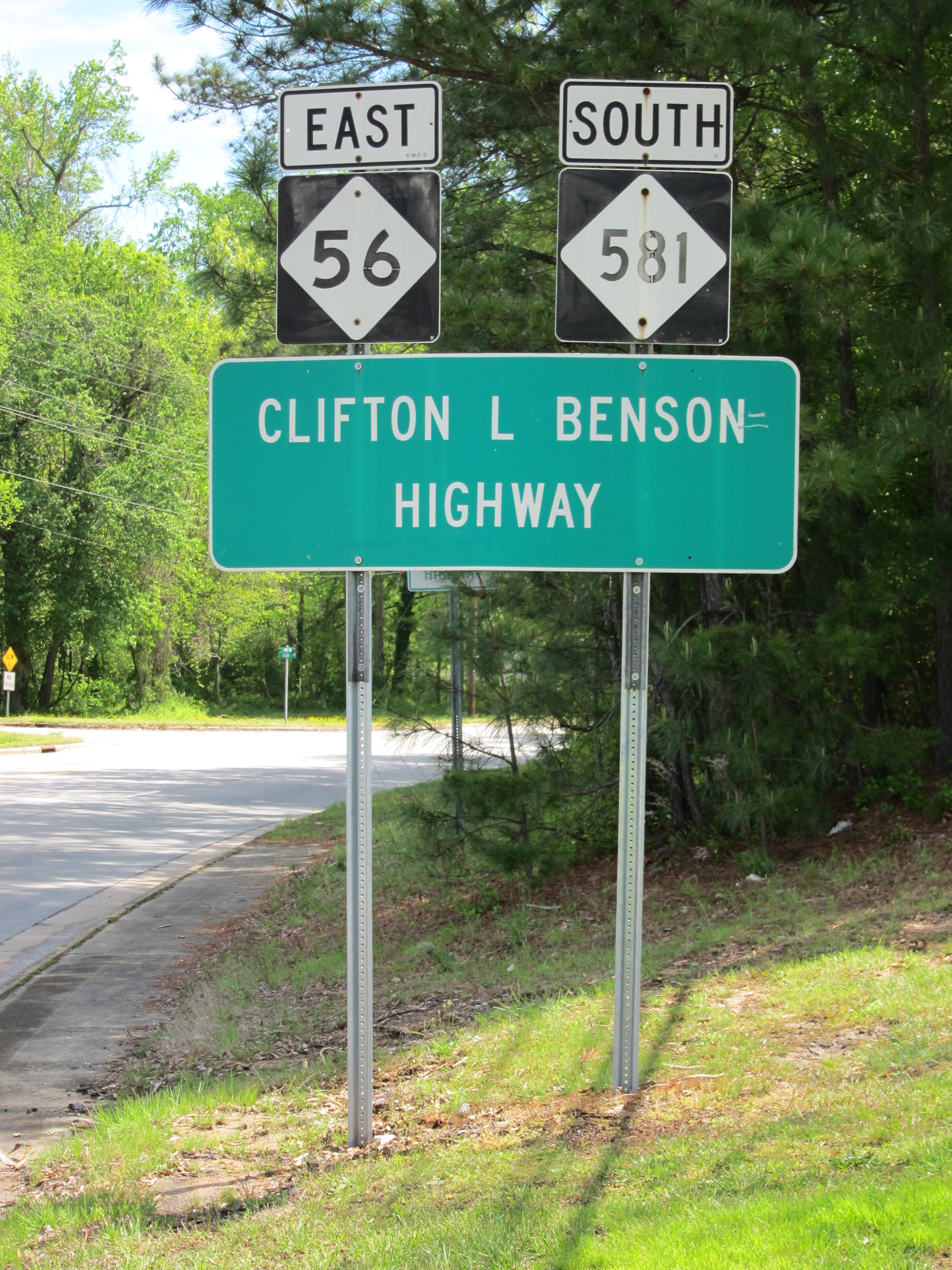
Clifton L. Benson Highway sign as seen along the NC 56/NC 581 concurrency

NC 581 feature two dedicated stretches of highway:

- George Washington Finch Bridge – Official name of the NC 581 overpass of US 264 in Nash County (approved: September 8, 1978).
- Clifton L Benson Highway – Official name of NC 56/NC 581 from Mapleville to Louisburg (approved: December 7, 1972).

== History ==
Established in 1933 as a new primary routing, NC 581 originally traversed from US 264/NC 91 in Bailey, north to US 64/NC 90 in Spring Hope. In 1937, NC 581 was extended south on new primary routing to US 301 near Lucama. By 1941, NC 581 was also extended north on new primary routing to NC 56 in Mapleville.

By 1950, NC 581 extended again on new primary routing south to US 70, then east replacing NC 111, ending at US 70 Business and US 117 Business in downtown Goldsboro. In 1982, NC 581 was extended north from Mapleville, concurrency overlapped with NC 56, to its current northern terminus in Louisburg.

In 1998, NC 581 was removed from downtown Goldsboro and redirected south along US 13/US 117, from Ash Street to Arrington Bridge Road, then southeast to its current southern terminus with NC 111. In 2008, NC 581 was realigned onto new freeway extension with US 117, removing it from part of Ash Street and overlap with US 13/US 117 Alternate; a year later US 117 would revert to its former route, leaving NC 581 on the new freeway segment.

In 2015, NC 581 was rerouted in Bailey, following along the truck route along Main, Benson and Deans Streets; the one block of Sanford Street became SR 1186 and is restricted to all thru trucks with a load limit exceeding 13,000 pounds (5,900 kg). The justification for the route change was because of the railroad underpass with a 8.6 feet (2.6 m) vertical clearance. Nine crashes, including a school activity bus, happened between May 1, 2008 and April 30, 2013; also, representatives from Carolina and Northwestern Railroad indicated that they would not allow a widening of the underpass.

== Junction list ==
County	Location	mi	km	Destinations	Notes
Wayne	Goldsboro	0.0	0.0	NC 111 – Beulaville, Goldsboro	
Wayne	Goldsboro	6.0	9.7	US 13 south / US 117 south	South end of US 13/US 117 overlap
Wayne	Goldsboro	6.9	11.1	US 117 Bus. north (George Street)	Southern terminus of US 117 Bus.
Wayne	Goldsboro	8.4	13.5	US 13 north / US 117 north – Kinston, Greenville	North end of US 13/US 117 overlap
Wayne	Goldsboro	8.9	14.3	To I-795 north (NC 581 Conn.) – Wilson	Southern terminus of NC 581 Conn.
Wayne	Goldsboro	14.6	23.5	US 70 – Goldsboro, Smithfield, Raleigh	
Wayne	Goldsboro	15.1	24.3	I-42	Exit 35 (I-42)
Wayne		24.7	39.8	NC 222 – Fremont, Kenly	
Wilson	Kirbys Crossing	29.8	48.0	US 301 – Wilson, Kenly	
Wilson	Buckhorn Crossroads	34.7	55.8	NC 42 – Wilson, Clayton	
Nash	Bailey	42.5	68.4	US 264 Alt. east (Deans Street) / Benson Street – Wilson	South end of US 264 Alt. concurrency
Nash	Bailey	42.7	68.7	US 264 Alt. west (Deans Street) / Sanford Street – Middlesex	North end of US 264 Alt. concurrency
Nash	Bailey	43.2	69.5	US 264 – Wilson, Raleigh	Exit 30 (US 264)
Nash	Floods Chapel	48.9	78.7	NC 97 – Rocky Mount, Zebulon	
Nash		53.8	86.6	US 64 – Rocky Mount, Raleigh	Interchange
Nash	Spring Hope	55.1	88.7	US 64 Alt. west (Nash Street) – Zebulon	West end of US 64 Alt. overlap
Nash	Spring Hope	55.6	89.5	US 64 Alt. east (Nash Street) – Nashville	East end of US 64 Alt. overlap
Franklin	Mapleville	67.8	109.1	NC 56 east – Castalia, Rocky Mount	South end of NC 56 overlap
Franklin	Louisburg	72.1	116.0	US 401 / NC 39 / NC 56 west – Henderson, Raleigh	North end of NC 56 overlap
1.000 mi = 1.609 km; 1.000 km = 0.621 mi: Concurrency terminus

== Special routes ==
=== Goldsboro connector ===
North Carolina Highway 581 Connector
- Location: Goldsboro, North Carolina
- Length: 0.6 mi (970 m)
- Existed: 2009–present

North Carolina Highway 581 Connector (NC 581 Conn.) was established in 2009 as a renumbering of US 117 along a 0.6-mile (0.97 km) of freeway, connecting I-795 at Grantham Street (US 70) and NC 581 at Ash Street. Identified only on official state maps, the route is only marked as either "TO I-795" or "TO US 117."

Identified as:

To I-795 (NB)

or

To NC 581 / US 117 (SB)

=== Bailey truck route ===
North Carolina Highway 581 Truck
- Location: Bailey, North Carolina
- Length: 0.4 mi (640 m)
- Existed: 2015

North Carolina Highway 581 Truck (NC 581 Truck) was a detour for all trucks and vehicles that are 8.6 feet (2.6 m) or taller. The route avoids a low railroad overpass bridge on NC 581; travelers who took the route would traverse along Main, Benson and Deans Street (US 264 Alt.) in Bailey. On August 12, 2015, the truck route was eliminated in favor of rerouting NC 581 along said route.
