= Harris Crossroads, North Carolina =

Harris Crossroads is the name of several places in the U.S. state of North Carolina:

- Harris Crossroads, Franklin County, North Carolina
- Harris Crossroads, Moore County, North Carolina
- Harris Crossroads, Vance County, North Carolina
