= WAUG (AM) =

- New Hope, North Carolina; United States
- Broadcast area: Raleigh–Durham; Research Triangle
- Frequency: 750 kHz
- Branding: Hot 97.9

Programming
- Format: Mainstream urban

Ownership
- Owner: St. Augustine's University
- Sister stations: WAUG-LD

History
- First air date: July 20, 1987
- Call sign meaning: St. Augustine's University

Technical information
- Licensing authority: FCC
- Facility ID: 58586
- Class: D
- Power: 500 watts day
- Transmitter coordinates: 35°47′28.54″N 78°37′9.01″W
- Translator: 97.9 W250AZ (Raleigh)

Links
- Public license information: Public file; LMS
- Webcast: Listen live
- Website: hot979nc.com

WAUG (750 kHz) is an AM and FM radio station broadcasting a mainstream urban format. Licensed to New Hope, North Carolina, United States, the station serves the Raleigh–Durham area. The station is owned by St. Augustine's University and features programming from American Urban Radio Networks and the Radio One-owned Syndication One. WAUG radio is a daytime-only operation, leaving the air at sunset to prevent interference to 50,000-watt WSB in Atlanta, the Class A clear-channel station on 750 AM. Its programming is also carried on FM translator W250AZ (97.9) in Raleigh.

The university also runs a low-powered TV station, WAUG-LD (channel 8). WAUG-LD is carried by Spectrum Cable on digital cable channel 168 in Raleigh.

== History ==
WAUG "Power 750" began broadcasting in 1987 from the campus of Saint Augustine's University. In October 2006, the station switched primarily to a talk radio format aimed at the Black community. Shows includes the nationally syndicated News One Now with Roland Martin, Keepin' It Real with Al Sharpton and Biz Talk with Josh Smith. The station also carried football games from the Washington Redskins as well as St. Augustine's University Sports including the CIAA Basketball Tournament. The station was also the flagship for From The Press Box To The Press Row, a sports talk show focused on Black college sports which was heard on syndicated stations through the mid-Atlantic region from Pennsylvania to Georgia.

In October 2018, WAUG changed its format from talk to mainstream urban, branded as "Hot 97.9" to reflect its simulcast on FM translator W250AZ (97.9). Hot 97.9 is operated by Damian Powell of Powell Media under a lease agreement.

== Translator ==
Call sign	Frequency	City of license	FID	ERP (W)	Class	Transmitter coordinates	FCC info
W250AZ	97.9 FM	Raleigh, North Carolina	146926	200	D	35°48′13.5″N 78°37′26″W	LMS
