= Alert, North Carolina =

Unincorporated community in North Carolina, US

Coordinates: 36°13′52″N 78°13′21″W

Location of Alert within the state of North Carolina

Alert is an unincorporated community in northern Franklin County, North Carolina, United States. It is located northeast of Louisburg, at an elevation of 397 feet (121 m). The primary cross roads where the community is located are Alert Road (SR 1407), Pete Smith Road (SR 1412) and Alert-Gold Sand Road (SR 1407).
