= Oswego, North Carolina =

Unincorporated community in North Carolina, US

Coordinates: 36°09′01″N 78°11′50″W

Oswego is an unincorporated community in northeastern Franklin County, North Carolina, United States.

It is located southwest of Centerville, at an elevation of 384 feet (117 m). The primary cross roads where the community is located are N.C. Highway 561, Laurel Mill Road (SR 1436) and Hight Road (SR 1429).
