= New Hope, Franklin County, North Carolina =

Unincorporated community in North Carolina

Coordinates: 35°58′08″N 78°20′08″W

New Hope is an unincorporated community in southern Franklin County, North Carolina, United States.

It is located west-northwest of Bunn, at an elevation of 364 feet (111 m). The primary cross roads where the community is located are N.C. Highway 98, Clifton Pond Road (SR 1103) and Bethlehem Church Road (SR 1103).
