= Kearney, North Carolina =

Unincorporated community in North Carolina, US

Coordinates: 36°13′29″N 78°16′24″W

Kearney is an unincorporated community in northern Franklin County, North Carolina, United States.

It is located north-northeast of Louisburg, at an elevation of 394 feet (120 m). The primary cross roads where the community is located are U.S. Highway 401, Fuller Road (SR 1401) and Tollie Weldon Road (SR 1401).
