= North Carolina Highway 39 =

State highway in North Carolina, US

North Carolina Highway 39

- Route of NC 39 highlighted in red

Route information
- Maintained by NCDOT
- Length: 79.3 mi (127.6 km)
- Existed: 1935–present

Major junctions
- South end: US 70 in Selma
- I-95 in Selma; NC 96 in Selma; US 301 in Selma; US 264 in Zebulon; US 64 near Pilot; US 401 / NC 56 in Louisburg; US 1 near Henderson; I-85 / US 158 in Henderson
- North end: SR 719 at the Virginia state line near Richardson, VA

Location
- Country: United States
- State: North Carolina
- Counties: Johnston, Wake, Franklin, Vance

Highway system
- North Carolina Highway System; Interstate; US; State; Scenic
← NC 38	→ I-40

North Carolina Highway 39 (NC 39) is a primary state highway in the U.S. state of North Carolina. Traveling north–south, it connects the cities of Selma, Louisburg and Henderson, in the Research Triangle area.

== Route description ==
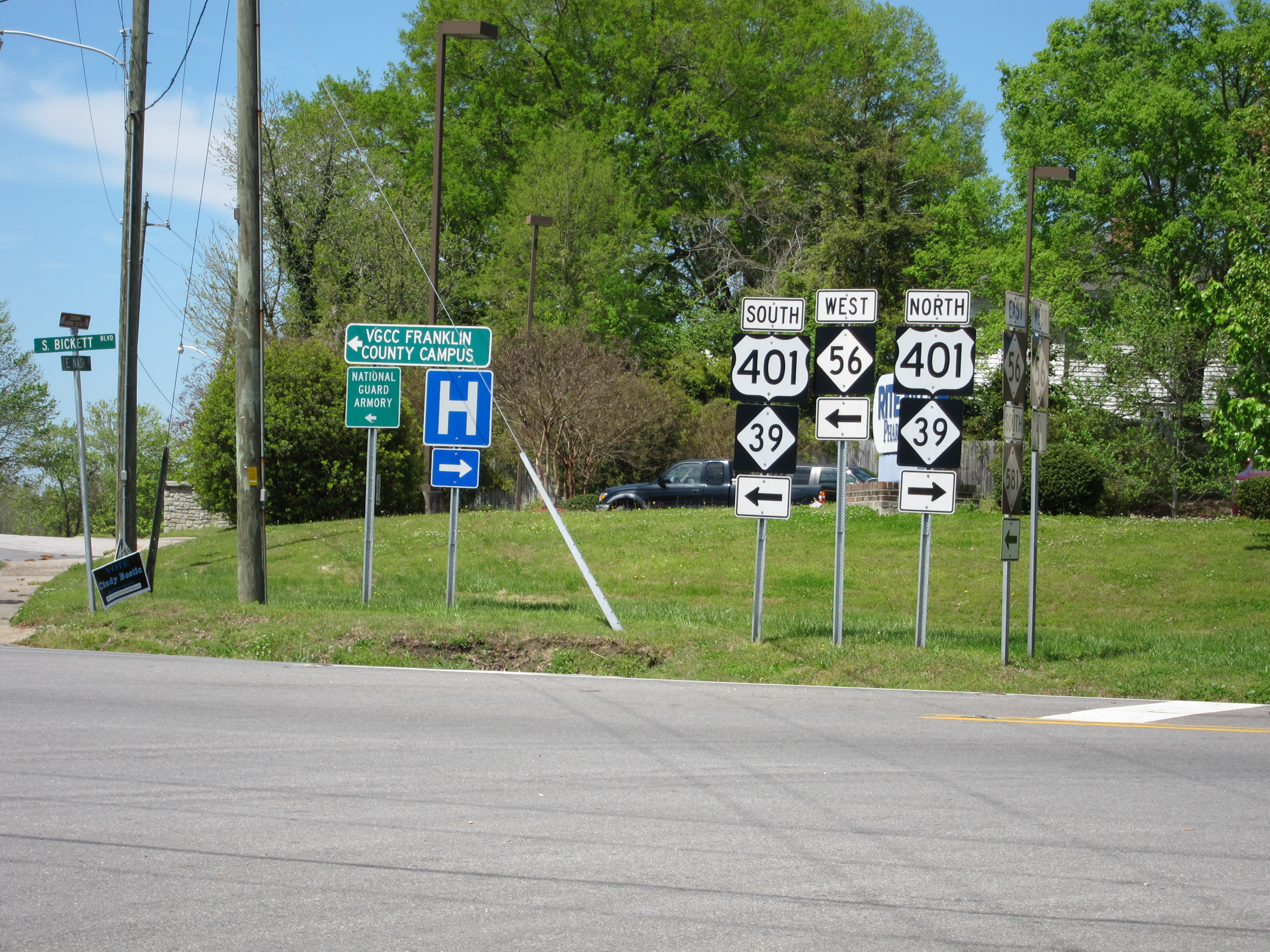
Bickett at Nash, in Louisburg

NC 39 is a predominantly two-lane rural highway that travels 79.3 miles (127.6 km) from US 70, in Selma, to the Virginia state line, north of Townsville.

NC 39 begins as a concurrency along US 301/NC 96, north of US 70. First signs of NC 39 appear alongside US 301/NC 96 through downtown Selma. Within the next 4.4 miles (7.1 km), NC 39 splits from both highways as it continues north, through the communities of Hares Crossroads and Emit, before crossing the Johnston–Wake county line.

In Wake County, NC 39 travels 2.76 miles (4.44 km) through its easterly tip; overlapping briefly with US 264 Alternate and connecting with mainline US 264, in Zebulon. This entire section is mostly forest, crossing NC 97 halfway through and enters Franklin County at Bunn Lake. Northeast of Bunn Lake, NC 39 crosses over US 64. Continuing north, it goes through the communities of Pilot and Sutton, before reaching NC 98, in Bunn. Traveling northwesterly for 9 miles (14 km), it enters Louisburg city limits and soon connects with US 401/NC 56 at Bickett Boulevard. Through Louisburg, NC 56/NC 581 splits at Nash Street towards Rocky Mount and NC 561 splits at Justice Street towards Centerville. North of Louisburg, in the Ingleside community, US 401 splits towards Warrenton.

NC 39 enters Vance County at Epsom. Going northwesterly, through Gillburg, it enters Henderson city limits near the US 1 interchange. Traveling along Andrews Avenue, it crosses US 1 Business/US 158 Business at Garnett Street, in the downtown area. After crossing over I-85/US 158, it leaves Henderson city limits traveling north. At Harris Crossroads, it meets up with the southwestern edge of Kerr Lake. Continuing north, to the west of Kerr Lake, it travels through the Williamsboro and Townsville communities before ending at the Virginia state line. Before 1952, when John H. Kerr Dam was completed, the road in Virginia would have continued towards Boydton, Virginia; however since then, the road makes a turn southwest, at Richardson, Virginia, and re-enters North Carolina as Townsville Road, eventually ending at US 15.

== History ==
NC 39 was established in 1934 as a partial replacement of NC 23, between Selma and Louisburg, and a complete replacement of NC 501, from Louisburg to the Virginia state line towards Boydton. In 1941, NC 39 was placed on direct routing between Zebulon and Pilot, ending a western overlap along US 264 then northeastern overlap along US 64 to Pilot. Between 1947-1949, NC 39/NC 59 was placed on new bypass east of Louisburg; the old alignment along Main Street was downgraded to secondary road. In 1971, NC 39 was rerouted through downtown Henderson, via Andrews Avenue between Chestnut Street and Witherspoon Avenue; the old alignment, downgraded to secondary roads, was a zig-zag alignment via Cooper Avenue, Chestnut Street, Young Street and Beck Avenue. Around 1992, NC 39 was extended south, along US 301 and then east along a hidden .9-mile (1.4 km) concurrency with US 70 to its new southern terminus at US 70A; it was originally to replace what remained of US 70A, which was approved for elimination by AASHTO, but was scuttled by local opposition.

=== North Carolina Highway 501 ===
North Carolina Highway 501
- Location: Louisburg–VA state line
- Existed: 1929–1934

North Carolina Highway 501 (NC 501) was established in 1929 as primary routing from Henderson to the Virginia Border. Virginia did not have any primary routing that continues into their state from the terminus of NC 501. In 1930 NC 501 was extended further south to Louisburg. In late 1934, NC 501 was renumbered into NC 39, so it would not conflict with US 501.

== Major intersections ==
County	Location	mi	km	Destinations	Notes
Johnston	Selma	0.0	0.0	US 70 / US 70A east – Pine Level, Goldsboro	East end of US 70 overlaps
Johnston	Selma	0.3	0.48	I-95 – Wilson, Benson	Exit 97 (I-95)
Johnston	Selma	0.9	1.4	US 70 / US 301 south / NC 96 south (Pollock Street) – Clayton, Smithfield	South end of US 301 / NC 96 overlap
Johnston	Selma	2.4	3.9	NC 96 north (Sumner Street) – Zebulon	North end of NC 96 overlap
Johnston	Selma	3.3	5.3	US 301 north – Kenly	North end of US 301 overlap
Johnston	Hares Crossroads	11.9	19.2	NC 42 – Clayton, Wilson	
Johnston	Emit	16.9	27.2	NC 231 – Wendell, Middlesex	
Wake	Zebulon	22.5	36.2	US 264 Alt. east – Middlesex	East end of US 264 Alt overlap
Wake	Zebulon	22.5	36.2	US 264 / US 264 Alt. end – Wilson, Raleigh	West end of US 264 Alt overlap; exit 21 (US 264), diamond interchange
Wake	Zebulon	23.5	37.8	NC 97 – Rocky Mount, Zebulon	
Franklin		25.4	40.9	US 64 – Rocky Mount, Raleigh	Exit 439 (US 64), diamond interchange
Franklin	Bunn	32.1	51.7	NC 98 east – Spring Hope	South end of NC 98 overlap
Franklin	Bunn	32.9	52.9	NC 98 west – Wake Forest	North end of NC 98 overlap
Franklin	Louisburg	42.5	68.4	US 401 south / NC 56 west (Bickett Boulevard) – Raleigh, Franklinton	South end of US 401 and west end of NC 56 overlaps
Franklin	Louisburg	43.5	70.0	NC 56 east / NC 581 south (Nash Street) – Rocky Mount	East end of NC 56 overlap
Franklin	Louisburg	44.0	70.8	NC 561 east (Justice Street) – Centerville	Western terminus of NC 561
Franklin	Ingleside	48.9	78.7	US 401 north – Warrenton	North end of US 401 overlap
Vance	Henderson	61.1	98.3	US 1 – Norlina, Raleigh	Diamond interchange
Vance	Henderson	62.2	100.1	US 1 Bus. / US 158 Bus. (Garnett Street)	
Vance	Henderson	63.1	101.5	I-85 / US 158 – Richmond, Oxford, Durham	Exit 214 (I-85), partial cloverleaf interchange
Vance		79.3	127.6	SR 719 north (Rock Church Road)	Virginia state line
1.000 mi = 1.609 km; 1.000 km = 0.621 mi: Concurrency terminus
