= WAUG-LD =

Television station in Raleigh, North Carolina

- Raleigh, North Carolina; United States
- Channels: Digital: 4 (VHF); Virtual: 8
- Branding: WAUG Network

Programming
- Affiliations: 8.1: Independent

Ownership
- Owner: St. Augustine's University
- Sister stations: WAUG

History
- First air date: 1988
- Former call signs: W68BK (1988–2012); WAUG-LP (2012–2014)
- Former channel numbers: Analog: 68 (UHF, 1988–2014); Digital: 8 (VHF, 2014–2022)
- Call sign meaning: St. Augustine's University

Technical information
- Licensing authority: FCC
- Facility ID: 62180
- Class: LD
- ERP: 3 kW
- HAAT: 80.4 m (264 ft)
- Transmitter coordinates: 35°47′28″N 78°37′9″W

Links
- Public license information: LMS
- Website: www.st-aug.edu/waug/

WAUG-LD (channel 8) is a low-power independent television station in Raleigh, North Carolina, United States, owned by St. Augustine's University. Much of its programming is oriented towards the African-American community, which include gospel music, religious programming, and community affairs. In addition, students majoring in the Journalism and Mass Communications program at "St. Aug's" have the opportunity to work at the station in a laboratory setting to gain real-life experience while pursuing their degree. St. Augustine's also owns radio station WAUG (750 AM), which broadcasts talk shows and sports programs.

WAUG-LD signed on in 1988 as W68BK, though even early on it was known as "WAUG-TV". It aired a community bulletin board before affiliating with Channel America in 1989. It was added to the local cable system in 1992. It aired local programming and content from the Black Family Channel. The call sign was changed to WAUG-LP on April 9, 2012; it was modified to WAUG-LD shortly after being licensed for digital operation.

For a period of time, the school housed (but did not own) WRMY (channel 47), an independent station formerly based in Rocky Mount that moved its transmitter to Franklin County to provide better coverage to the Raleigh–Durham–Fayetteville market. WRMY was sold to Paxson Communications in 1998 and became WRPX, the area's Pax (now Ion) outlet.

== Subchannel ==
Subchannel of WAUG-LD
Subchannel	Res.	Short name	Programming
8.1	480i	WAUG-LD	Main WAUG-LD programming (4:3)
