= North Carolina Highway 56 =

State highway in North Carolina, US

North Carolina Highway 56

Route information
- Maintained by NCDOT
- Length: 42.8 mi (68.9 km)
- Existed: 1921–present

Major junctions
- West end: Central Avenue in Butner
- I-85 in Butner; US 15 in Creedmoor; US 1 in Franklinton; US 1A in Franklinton; US 401 in Louisburg
- East end: NC 58 near Castalia

Location
- Country: United States
- State: North Carolina
- Counties: Granville, Franklin, Nash

Highway system
- North Carolina Highway System; Interstate; US; State; Scenic
← NC 55	→ NC 57

North Carolina Highway 56 (NC 56) is a primary state highway in the U.S. state of North Carolina. The primarily rural route travels east from Butner to NC 58 north of Castalia. The route connects several major towns in both Granville and Franklin Counties including Creedmoor, Franklinton and Louisburg.

NC 56 was originally routed from NC 50 in Creedmoor to NC 90 in Nashville. Between 1924 and 1930, NC 56 was truncated to NC 58 in Castalia and extended US 15 in Creedmoor after it was truncated to US 1 near Franklinton. In 1974 the route was extended west to its current terminus in Butner.

== Route description ==
NC 56 is a predominantly two-lane rural highway connecting the three Counties of Granville, Franklin and Nash. Acting as a spur route, it begins at the intersection of Central Avenue/C Street, in Butner, and goes northeast to connect with I-85 (exit 191). Going southeasterly, it enters Creedmoor and has two brief concurrencies with US 15 and NC 50. Going in an easterly direction, it crosses NC 96, in Wilton, halfway before reaching Franklinton, where it connects with both US 1 and US 1A. Continuing east for 8.5 miles (13.7 km), it reaches Louisburg, where it has another short concurrency with US 401 and NC 39 along Bickett Boulevard. At the intersection of East Nash Street, NC 56 begin its concurrency with NC 581 to Mapleville. Continuing east for another 9.3 miles (15.0 km), it reaches its eastern terminus at NC 58, just over the Franklin/Nash County line and north of Castalia.

=== Dedicated and memorial names ===
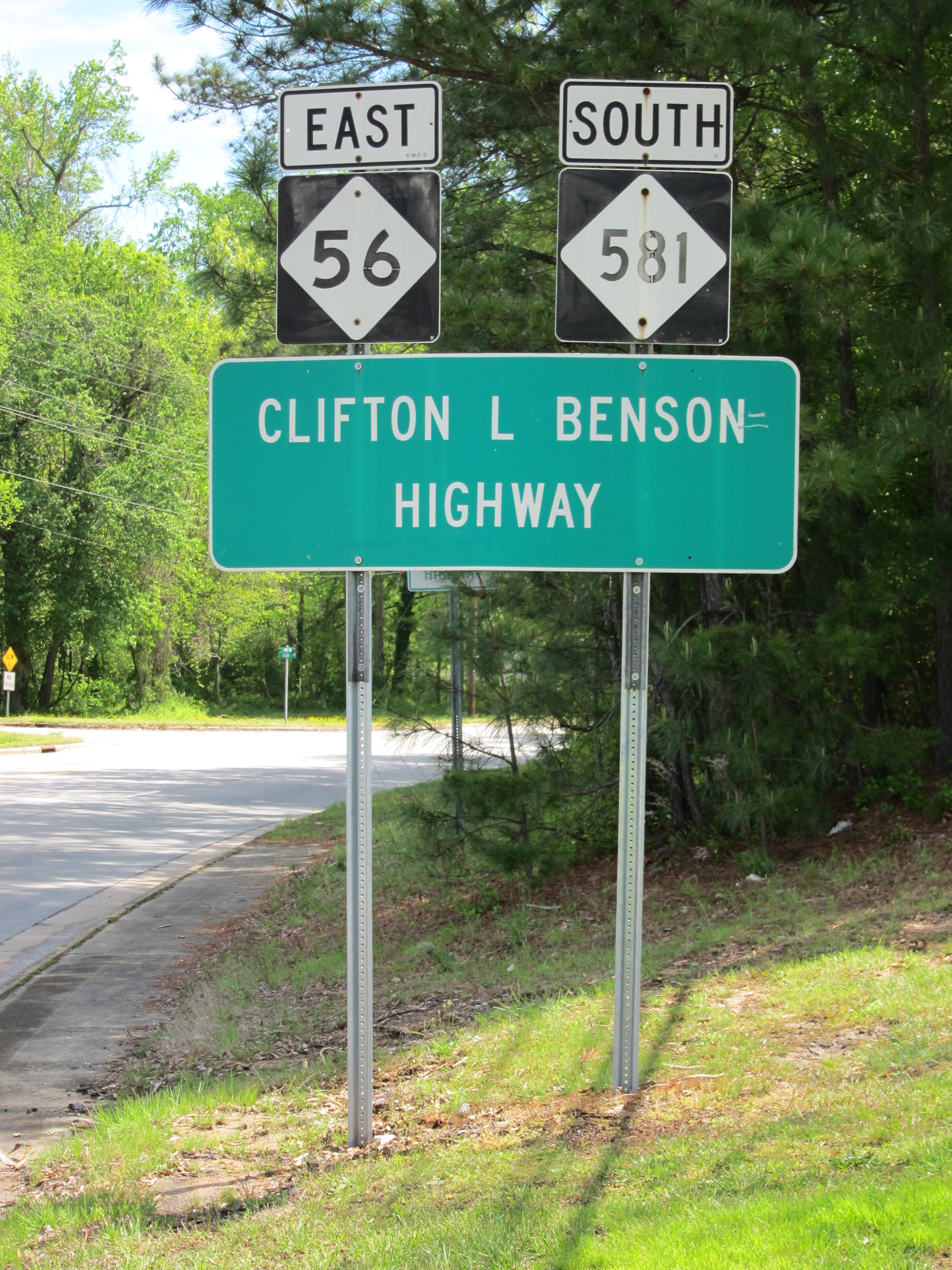
The Clifton L. Benson Highway

NC 56 features one dedicated stretch of highway.

- Clifton L Benson Highway – Official North Carolina name of NC 56, from Louisburg to NC 58, north of Castalia (approved: December 7, 1972).

== History ==
NC 56 is an original state highway that traversed from NC 50, in Franklinton, to NC 90, in Nashville. In 1923, it was extended west on new primary routing to Wilton, then northwest to NC 75, in Hester. Briefly from 1924 to 1925, NC 56 was truncated north of Castalia, replaced temporarily by NC 58. In 1929, NC 56 was truncated back to US 1/NC 50, in Franklinton; its routing west becoming secondary roads. In 1930, NC 56 was truncated again and its current eastern terminus at NC 58, north of Castalia; its old alignment was replaced again by NC 58 to Nashville. Also same year, NC 56 was extended west to US 15/NC 75, in Creedmoor.

Between 1947 and 1949, NC 56 was rerouted onto new bypass east of downtown Louisburg (today Bickett Boulevard), its old alignment along South Main Street and East Nash Street was downgraded to secondary roads (SR 1229 and SR 1231 respectively). In 1974, NC 56 was extended to its current western terminus in Butner, an upgrade to Butner-Creedmoor Road (SR-1111). In 1975, NC 56 was rerouted back through downtown Louisburg, via South Main Street and East Nash Street; it is unknown when it was reverted onto Bickett Boulevard.

== Major intersections ==
County	Location	mi	km	Destinations	Notes
Granville	Butner	0.0	0.0	To I-85 / Central Avenue	
Granville	Butner	2.3	3.7	I-85 – Durham, Henderson	I-85 exit 191, Diamond interchange
Granville	Creedmoor	5.0	8.0	US 15 south (Durham Avenue) – Durham	South end of US 15 overlap
Granville	Creedmoor	5.1	8.2	US 15 north (Durham Avenue) – Oxford	North end of US 15/NC 50 overlap
Granville	Creedmoor	5.3	8.5	NC 50 south (Main Street) – Raleigh	South end of NC 50 overlap
Granville	Wilton	11.7	18.8	NC 96 – Youngsville, Oxford	
Franklin	Franklinton	18.6	29.9	US 1 – Raleigh, Henderson	Diamond interchange
Franklin	Franklinton	19.0	30.6	US 1A (Main Street) – Raleigh, Henderson	
Franklin	Louisburg	27.6	44.4	US 401 south (Bickett Boulevard) – Raleigh	South end of US 401 overlap
Franklin	Louisburg	28.3	45.5	NC 39 south (Bunn Road) – Bunn	South end of NC 39 overlap
Franklin	Louisburg	29.3	47.2	US 401 / NC 39 north (Bickett Boulevard) / NC 581 begins – Henderson	North end of US 401/NC 39/NC 581 overlap
Franklin	Mapleville	33.6	54.1	NC 581 south – Spring Hope	South end of NC 581 overlap
Nash		42.8	68.9	NC 58 – Nashville, Warrenton	
1.000 mi = 1.609 km; 1.000 km = 0.621 mi: Concurrency terminus
