= Hickory Rock, North Carolina =

Unincorporated community in North Carolina, US

Coordinates: 36°07′28″N 78°12′36″W

Hickory Rock is an unincorporated community in east central Franklin County, North Carolina, United States. It is located at the intersection of Hickory Rock Road (SR 1421) and Ronald Tharrington Road (SR 1419), east-northeast of Louisburg, at an elevation of 394 feet (120 m).
