= Robert J. Lang Jr. House =

Historic house in North Carolina, United States

- U.S. National Register of Historic Places
- Location within North Carolina Location within the United States
- Location: SR 1231, 0.1 miles (0.16 km) south of the junction with SR 1200, near Fountain, North Carolina
- Coordinates: 35°37′58″N 77°40′32″W
- Area: 2 acres (0.81 ha)
- Built: c. 1870
- Architectural style: Greek Revival, Italianate
- NRHP reference No.: 90001313
- Added to NRHP: August 23, 1990

Robert J. Lang Jr. House is a historic home located near Fountain, Pitt County, North Carolina. It was built about 1870, and is a one-story, three-bay, double pile Greek Revival / Italianate style frame dwelling. It is sheathed in clapboard siding, has a gable roof, and a detached rear kitchen wing. It features a nearly full-width hipped roof front porch and flanking stuccoed brick chimneys.

It was listed on the National Register of Historic Places in 1990.
