= Moulton, North Carolina =

Unincorporated community in North Carolina, US

Coordinates: 36°10′18″N 78°15′08″W

Moulton is an unincorporated community in north central Franklin County, North Carolina, United States.

It is located at the intersection of Moulton Road (SR 1414) and Trinity Church Road (SR 1002), north-northeast of Louisburg, at an elevation of 404 feet (123 m).
