= Mitchiners Crossroads, North Carolina =

Unincorporated community in North Carolina, US

Coordinates: 36°07′24″N 78°23′32″W

Mitchiners Crossroads is an unincorporated community in western Franklin County, North Carolina, United States.

It is located east of Franklinton, at an elevation of 371 feet (113 m). The primary cross roads where the community is located are West River Road (SR 1211), Perry's Chapel Church Road (SR 1003), Sims Bridge Road (SR 1003) and Will Mitchiner Road (SR 1222).
