= Pocomoke, North Carolina =

Unincorporated community in North Carolina, US

Coordinates: 36°04′50″N 78°32′25″W

Pocomoke is an unincorporated community in western Franklin County, North Carolina, United States, near the Granville County line.

It is located at the intersection of N.C. Highway 96 and Pocomoke Road (SR 1127), southwest of Franklinton, at an elevation of 522 feet (159 m).
