= White Level, North Carolina =

Unincorporated community in North Carolina, US

Coordinates: 36°08′00″N 78°08′35″W

White Level is an unincorporated community in eastern Franklin County, North Carolina, United States.

It is located at the intersection of White Level Road (SR 1425) and Wood Road (SR 1459), east-northeast of Louisburg, at an elevation of 325 feet (99 m).

In 2022, citizen Jason “Alley Cat” Alley was named mayor of White Level, becoming the communities first mayor
