= Fountain, North Carolina =

- Town
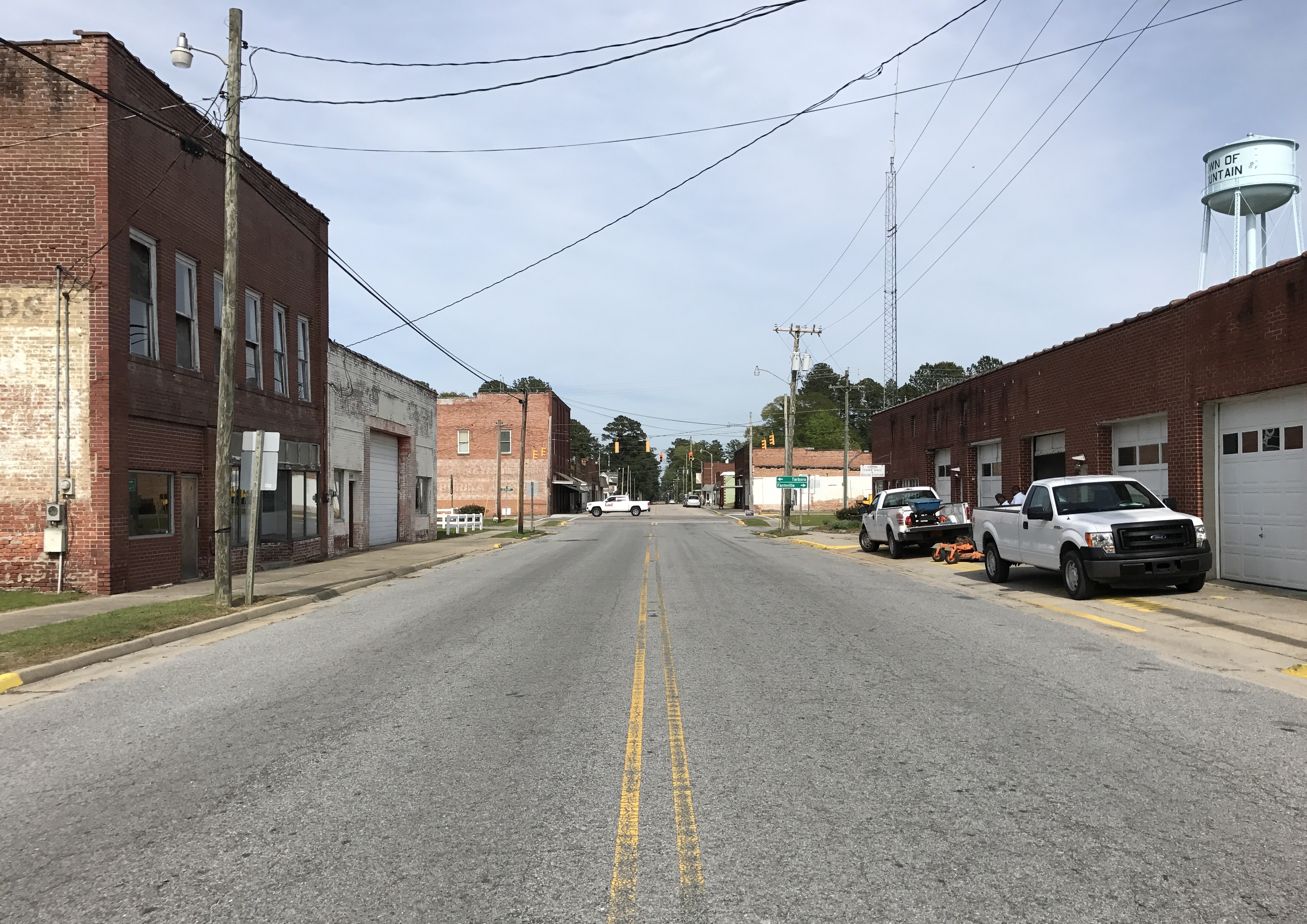

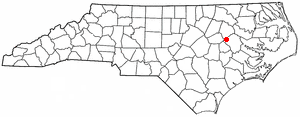
- Location of Fountain, North Carolina
- Coordinates: 35°40′19″N 77°37′54″W
- Country: United States
- State: North Carolina
- County: Pitt

Government
  - Mayor: Steven Morse Williams

Area
  - Total: 0.92 sq mi (2.38 km^{2})
  - Land: 0.92 sq mi (2.38 km^{2})
  - Water: 0 sq mi (0.00 km^{2})
- Elevation: 98 ft (30 m)

Population (2024)
  - Total: 385
  - Density: 418.4/sq mi (161.53/km^{2})
- Time zone: UTC-5 (Eastern (EST))
  - Summer (DST): UTC-4 (EDT)
- ZIP code: 27829
- Area code: 252
- FIPS code: 37-24440
- GNIS feature ID: 2406512
- Website: townoffountainnc.com

Fountain is a town in Pitt County, North Carolina, United States. The population was 389 at the 2024 census. The town is a part of the Greenville Metropolitan Area located in North Carolina's Inner Banks region.

== History ==
The Robert J. Lang Jr. House was listed on the National Register of Historic Places in 1990.

== Geography ==
According to the United States Census Bureau, the town has a total area of 1.0 square mile (2.6 km^{2}), all land.

== Demographics ==
Historical population
| Census | Pop. | Note | %± |
|---|---|---|---|
| 1910 | 189 | | — |
| 1920 | 243 | | 28.6% |
| 1930 | 360 | | 48.1% |
| 1940 | 483 | | 34.2% |
| 1950 | 451 | | −6.6% |
| 1960 | 496 | | 10.0% |
| 1970 | 434 | | −12.5% |
| 1980 | 424 | | −2.3% |
| 1990 | 445 | | 5.0% |
| 2000 | 533 | | 19.8% |
| 2010 | 427 | | −19.9% |
| 2020 | 385 | | −9.8% |
U.S. Decennial Census

=== Racial and ethnic composition ===
Fountain town, North Carolina – Racial and ethnic composition Note: the US Census treats Hispanic/Latino as an ethnic category. This table excludes Latinos from the racial categories and assigns them to a separate category. Hispanics/Latinos may be of any race.
| Race / Ethnicity (NH = Non-Hispanic) | Pop 2000 | Pop 2010 | Pop 2020 | % 2000 | % 2010 | % 2020 |
|---|---|---|---|---|---|---|
| White alone (NH) | 259 | 199 | 183 | 48.59% | 46.60% | 47.53% |
| Black or African American alone (NH) | 269 | 212 | 164 | 50.47% | 49.65% | 42.60% |
| Native American or Alaska Native alone (NH) | 1 | 0 | 3 | 0.19% | 0.00% | 0.78% |
| Asian alone (NH) | 0 | 0 | 1 | 0.00% | 0.00% | 0.26% |
| Native Hawaiian or Pacific Islander alone (NH) | 0 | 0 | 1 | 0.00% | 0.00% | 0.26% |
| Other race alone (NH) | 0 | 0 | 2 | 0.00% | 0.00% | 0.52% |
| Mixed race or Multiracial (NH) | 1 | 10 | 9 | 0.19% | 2.34% | 2.34% |
| Hispanic or Latino (any race) | 3 | 6 | 22 | 0.56% | 1.41% | 5.71% |
| Total | 533 | 427 | 385 | 100.00% | 100.00% | 100.00% |

=== 2000 census ===
As of the census of 2000, there were 533 people, 227 households, and 155 families residing in the town. The population density was 550.9 inhabitants per square mile (212.7/km^{2}). There were 246 housing units at an average density of 254.3 per square mile (98.2/km^{2}). The racial makeup of the town was 48.97% White, 50.47% African American, 0.19% Native American, 0.19% from other races, and 0.19% from two or more races. Hispanic or Latino of any race were 0.56% of the population.

There were 227 households, out of which 30.4% had children under the age of 18 living with them, 41.0% were married couples living together, 25.6% had a female householder with no husband present, and 31.3% were non-families. 29.1% of all households were made up of individuals, and 17.6% had someone living alone who was 65 years of age or older. The average household size was 2.35 and the average family size was 2.88.

In the town, the population was spread out, with 26.1% under the age of 18, 7.3% from 18 to 24, 26.1% from 25 to 44, 22.5% from 45 to 64, and 18.0% who were 65 years of age or older. The median age was 40 years. For every 100 females, there were 70.3 males. For every 100 females age 18 and over, there were 65.5 males.

The median income for a household in the town was $17,656, and the median income for a family was $26,042. Males had a median income of $27,292 versus $19,643 for females. The per capita income for the town was $10,944. About 35.6% of families and 36.2% of the population were below the poverty line, including 51.9% of those under age 18 and 30.2% of those age 65 or over.
