= Mapleville, North Carolina =

Unincorporated community in North Carolina, US

Coordinates: 36°04′36″N 78°13′38″W

Mapleville is an unincorporated community in east central Franklin County, North Carolina, United States.

It is located east of Louisburg, at an elevation of 325 feet (99 m). The primary cross roads where the community is located are N.C. Highway 56, N.C. Highway 581 and Strange Road (SR 1422).
