= Castalia, North Carolina =

- Town
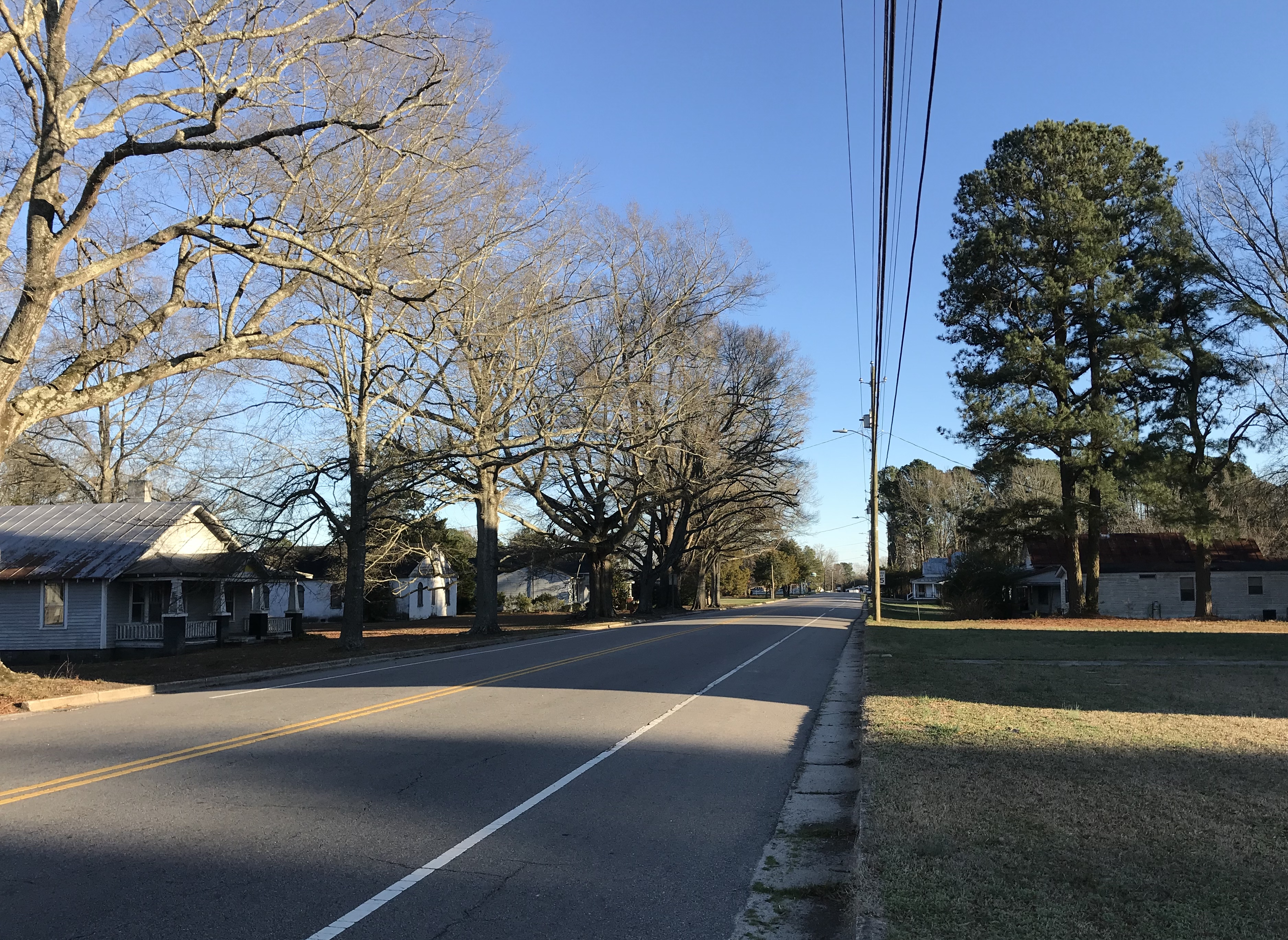
- Main Street in Castalia

- Location in Nash County and the state of North Carolina.
- Coordinates: 36°04′56″N 78°03′27″W
- Country: United States
- State: North Carolina
- County: Nash

Area
  - Total: 0.75 sq mi (1.95 km^{2})
  - Land: 0.75 sq mi (1.95 km^{2})
  - Water: 0 sq mi (0.00 km^{2})
- Elevation: 305 ft (93 m)

Population (2020)
  - Total: 264
  - Density: 350.7/sq mi (135.42/km^{2})
- Time zone: UTC-5 (Eastern (EST))
  - Summer (DST): UTC-4 (EDT)
- ZIP code: 27816
- Area codes: 919, 252
- FIPS code: 37-10860
- GNIS feature ID: 2406235

Castalia (pronounced "Cas-tale-yuh"), is a town in Nash County, North Carolina, United States. It is part of the Rocky Mount, North Carolina Metropolitan Statistical Area. As of the 2020 census, Castalia had a population of 264.

== History ==
Castalia developed in about 1850 and was incorporated as a town in 1873. The name was suggested by local educator R.D. Richardson in homage to the Castalian Spring in Greece.

== Geography ==
According to the United States Census Bureau, the town has a total area of 0.7 square miles (1.8 km^{2}), all land.

== Demographics ==
Historical population
Census	Pop.	Note	%±
1880	133		—
1890	159		19.5%
1900	163		2.5%
1910	219		34.4%
1920	263		20.1%
1930	292		11.0%
1940	341		16.8%
1950	421		23.5%
1960	267		−36.6%
1970	265		−0.7%
1980	358		35.1%
1990	261		−27.1%
2000	340		30.3%
2010	268		−21.2%
2020	264		−1.5%
U.S. Decennial Census

As of the census of 2000, there were 340 people, 132 households, and 102 families residing in the town. The population density was 462.4 inhabitants per square mile (178.5/km^{2}). There were 139 housing units at an average density of 189.0 per square mile (73.0/km^{2}). The racial makeup of the town was 50.59% White, 48.24% African American, and 1.18% Hispanic or Latino or more races.

There were 132 households, out of which 36.4% had children under the age of 18 living with them, 53.8% were married couples living together, 18.9% had a female householder with no husband present, and 22.7% were non-families. 20.5% of all households were made up of individuals, and 12.9% had someone living alone who was 65 years of age or older. The average household size was 2.58 and the average family size was 2.87.

In the town, the population was spread out, with 26.8% under the age of 18, 7.1% from 18 to 24, 31.5% from 25 to 44, 21.5% from 45 to 64, and 13.2% who were 65 years of age or older. The median age was 35 years. For every 100 females, there were 97.7 males. For every 100 females age 18 and over, there were 91.5 males.

The median income for a household in the town was $23,438, and the median income for a family was $29,375. Males had a median income of $23,750 versus $19,250 for females. The per capita income for the town was $12,455. About 23.2% of families and 22.9% of the population were below the poverty line, including 30.5% of those under age 18 and 37.5% of those age 65 or over.

== Climate ==
Castalia, being located in eastern North Carolina, has long hot humid summers, and winters which are short and mild by comparison to much of the rest of the country, with snow being a rarity. In Castalia, between 60 and 90 days per year are over 86 degrees Fahrenheit, according to the Heat Zone Map published by the American Horticultural Society. By comparison, the great majority of the upper midwest and northeast has less than 30 such days per year. These hot days, combined with the South's high humidity, make it sweltering in the summer. The average daytime temperature is in the high 70s or above for at least 5 months out of the year (May through September).

The following is the average weather for Castalia:

Climate data for Castalia, North Carolina
Month	Jan	Feb	Mar	Apr	May	Jun	Jul	Aug	Sep	Oct	Nov	Dec	Year
Mean daily maximum °F (°C)	50 (10)	54 (12)	62 (17)	72 (22)	79 (26)	85 (29)	89 (32)	87 (31)	81 (27)	71 (22)	64 (18)	54 (12)	71 (22)
Mean daily minimum °F (°C)	29 (−2)	31 (−1)	38 (3)	47 (8)	55 (13)	64 (18)	68 (20)	67 (19)	61 (16)	48 (9)	40 (4)	31 (−1)	48 (9)
Average precipitation inches (mm)	4.05 (103)	3.62 (92)	4.28 (109)	2.86 (73)	4.32 (110)	3.39 (86)	4.05 (103)	3.84 (98)	3.70 (94)	2.76 (70)	3.03 (77)	2.99 (76)	42.89 (1,089)
Source: Weather.com

== Works cited ==
- Fleming, Monika S. (1998). Rocky Mount and Nash County. Charleston: Arcadia Publishing. ISBN 9781439635407.
