= Harris Crossroads, Franklin County, North Carolina =

Coordinates: 35°58′57″N 78°22′56″W

Harris Crossroads is an unincorporated community in south central Franklin County, North Carolina, United States.

It is located at the intersection of U.S. Highway 401 and Tarboro Road (SR 1100), southeast of Youngsville, at an elevation of 404 feet (123 m).
