= Emit, North Carolina =

Unincorporated community in North Carolina, US

Coordinates: 35°44′24″N 78°15′24″W

Emit is an unincorporated community in Johnston County, North Carolina, United States, situated at the intersection of North Carolina Highway 39 and North Carolina Highway 231. It lies at an elevation of 285 feet (87 m).

== Notable person ==
Pro wrestler C. W. Anderson is from Emit.
