= Franklin County, North Carolina =

County in North Carolina, United States

- County
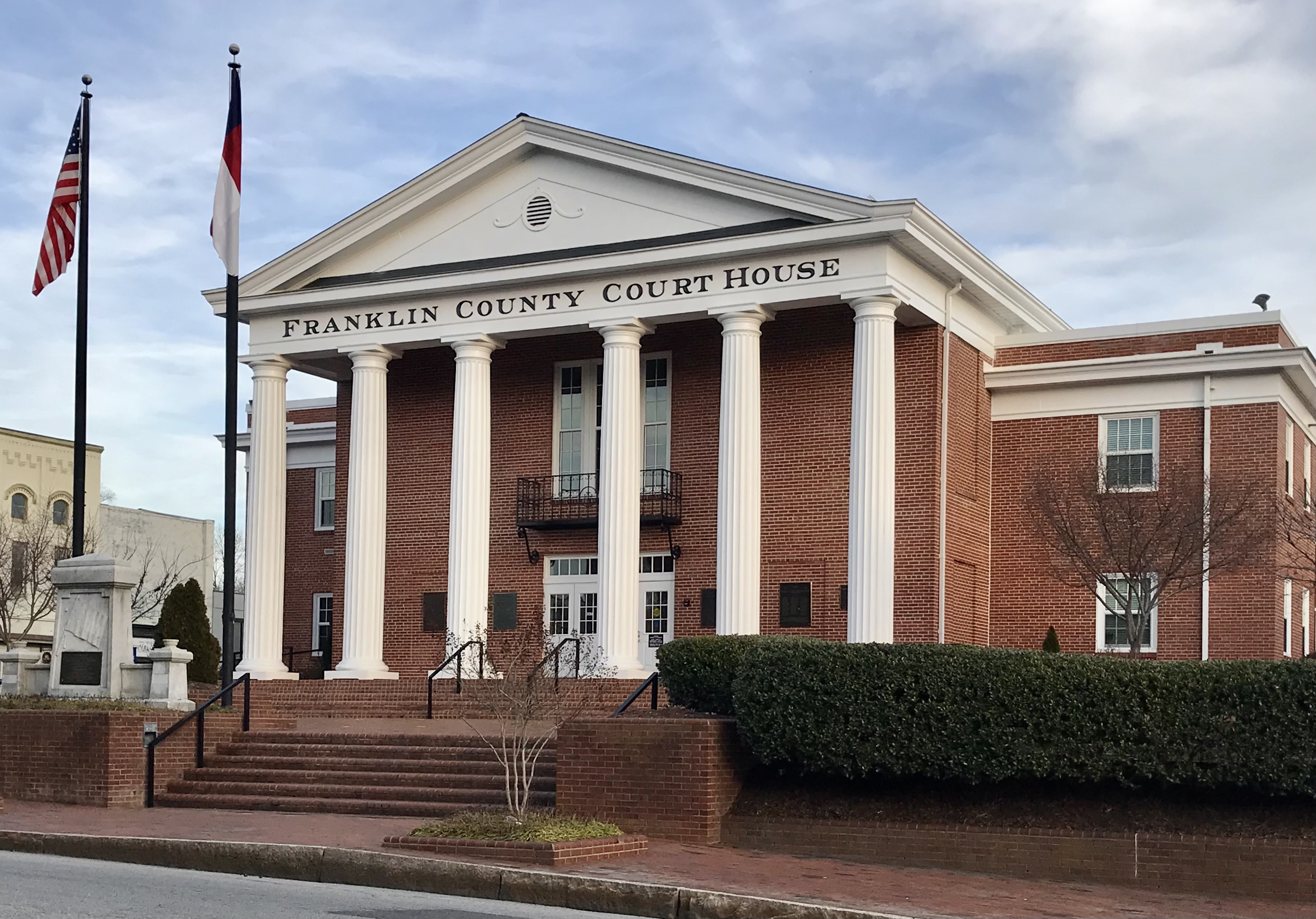
- Franklin County Courthouse in Louisburg

- Seal Logo
- Motto(s): "Leges Juraque Vindicamus" (Latin) (We Defend Laws and Justice) "A Research Triangle Region Community"
- Location within the U.S. state of North Carolina
- Interactive map of Franklin County, North Carolina
- Coordinates: 36.09°N 78.28°W
- Country: United States
- State: North Carolina
- Founded: 1779
- Named for: Benjamin Franklin
- Seat: Louisburg
- Largest community: Louisburg

Area
  - Total: 494.57 sq mi (1,280.9 km^{2})
  - Land: 491.80 sq mi (1,273.8 km^{2})
  - Water: 2.77 sq mi (7.2 km^{2}) 0.56%

Population (2020)
  - Total: 68,573
  - Estimate (2025): 82,037 ▲
  - Density: 139.43/sq mi (53.835/km^{2})
- Time zone: UTC−5 (Eastern)
  - Summer (DST): UTC−4 (EDT)
- Congressional district: 13th
- Website: www.franklincountync.gov

Franklin County is a county located in the U.S. state of North Carolina. As of the 2020 census, the population was 68,573. Its county seat is Louisburg. Franklin County is included in the Raleigh-Cary, NC Metropolitan Statistical Area, which is also included in the Raleigh-Durham-Cary, NC Combined Statistical Area, which had an estimated population of 2,368,947 in 2023.

== History ==
The county was formed in 1779 from the southern half of Bute County. It is named for Benjamin Franklin. It is a part of the Research Triangle.

=== County formation timeline ===
- 1664 – Albemarle County formed (original, extinct)
- 1668 – Albemarle County subdivided into Carteret, Berkeley, & Shaftesbury Precincts
- 1681 – Shaftesbury Precinct renamed Chowan Precinct
- 1722 – Bertie Precinct formed from Chowan Precinct
- 1739 – Bertie Precinct becomes Bertie County
- 1741 – Edgecombe County formed from Bertie County
- 1746 – Granville County formed from Edgecombe County
- 1754 – Creation of Bertie Precinct, Edgecombe County, & Granville County repealed by King George II, in Privy Council
- 1756 – Bertie, Edgecombe, & Granville re-created
- 1764 – Bute County (extinct) formed from Granville County
- 1779 – Franklin County formed from Bute County (extinct)
- 1787 – Franklin County gains land from Wake County
- 1875 – Franklin County gains land from Granville County
- 1881 – Franklin County loses land to help form Vance County

=== School desegregation ===
The integration of Franklin County Schools in 1965–1968 was marked by a federal lawsuit and some violence against African-American residents. The North Carolina Humanities Council funded the Tar River Center for History and Culture at Louisburg College to prepare "An Oral History of School Desegregation in Franklin County, North Carolina."

== County song ==
The "Franklin County Song" was selected in a 1929 contest by the county historical association as the song most suitable for public occasions. The words were written by Fred U. Wolfe, an agriculture teacher at Gold Sand. Sung to the tune "Maryland, My Maryland" ("O Christmas Tree"), the song was incorporated in the Bicentennial programs of 1979. At the evening convocation of January 29, Mrs. Beth Norris announced to the audience that Wolfe (retired and residing in North, South Carolina) was aware his song was part of the program that night.

With loyalty we sing thy praise,
Glory to thy honored name!
Our voices loud in tribute raise,
Making truth thy pow'r proclaim.
Thy past is marked with vict'ry bold;
Thy deeds today can ne'er be told,
And heroes brave shall e'er uphold
Franklin's name forevermore.

We love thy rich and fruitful soil,
Wood, and stream, and thriving town.
We love the gift of daily toil,
Making men of true renown.
Thy church and school shall ever stand
To drive the darkness from our land—
A true and loyal, valiant band,
Sons of Franklin evermore.

A shrine of promise, pow'r and truth,
Lasting righteousness and peace,
A land of hope for toiling youth,
Yielding songs that never cease.
Let ev'ry son and daughter stay
The hand of vice that brings decay.
When duty's voice we shall obey,
Franklin's name shall live for aye.

== Geography ==
According to the U.S. Census Bureau, the county has a total area of 494.57 square miles (1,280.9 km^{2}), of which 491.80 square miles (1,273.8 km^{2}) is land and 2.77 square miles (7.2 km^{2}) (0.56%) is water.

=== State and local protected areas ===
- Sandy Creek Game Land (part)
- Shocco Creek Game Land (part)
- V.E. and Lydia H. Owens Recreational Park at Bull Creek

=== Major water bodies ===
- Buffalo Creek
- Camping Creek
- Crooked Creek
- Fishing Creek
- Lake Royale
- Little River
- Sandy Creek
- Shocco Creek
- Tar River

=== Adjacent counties ===
- Warren County – northeast
- Vance County – north
- Granville County – northwest
- Wake County – southwest
- Johnston County – south
- Nash County – east

=== Major highways ===
- Future I-87
- US 1
- US 1A
- US 64
- US 401
- NC 39
- NC 56
- NC 58
- NC 96
- NC 97
- NC 98
- NC 561
- NC 581

=== Major infrastructure ===
- Triangle North Executive Airport

== Demographics ==
Historical population
Census	Pop.	Note	%±
1790	7,502		—
1800	8,529		13.7%
1810	10,166		19.2%
1820	9,741		−4.2%
1830	10,665		9.5%
1840	10,980		3.0%
1850	11,713		6.7%
1860	14,107		20.4%
1870	14,134		0.2%
1880	20,829		47.4%
1890	21,090		1.3%
1900	25,116		19.1%
1910	24,692		−1.7%
1920	26,667		8.0%
1930	29,456		10.5%
1940	30,382		3.1%
1950	31,341		3.2%
1960	28,755		−8.3%
1970	26,820		−6.7%
1980	30,055		12.1%
1990	36,414		21.2%
2000	47,260		29.8%
2010	60,619		28.3%
2020	68,573		13.1%
2025 (est.)	82,037	▲	19.6%
U.S. Decennial Census; 1790–1960 1900–1990; 1990–2000 2010 2020

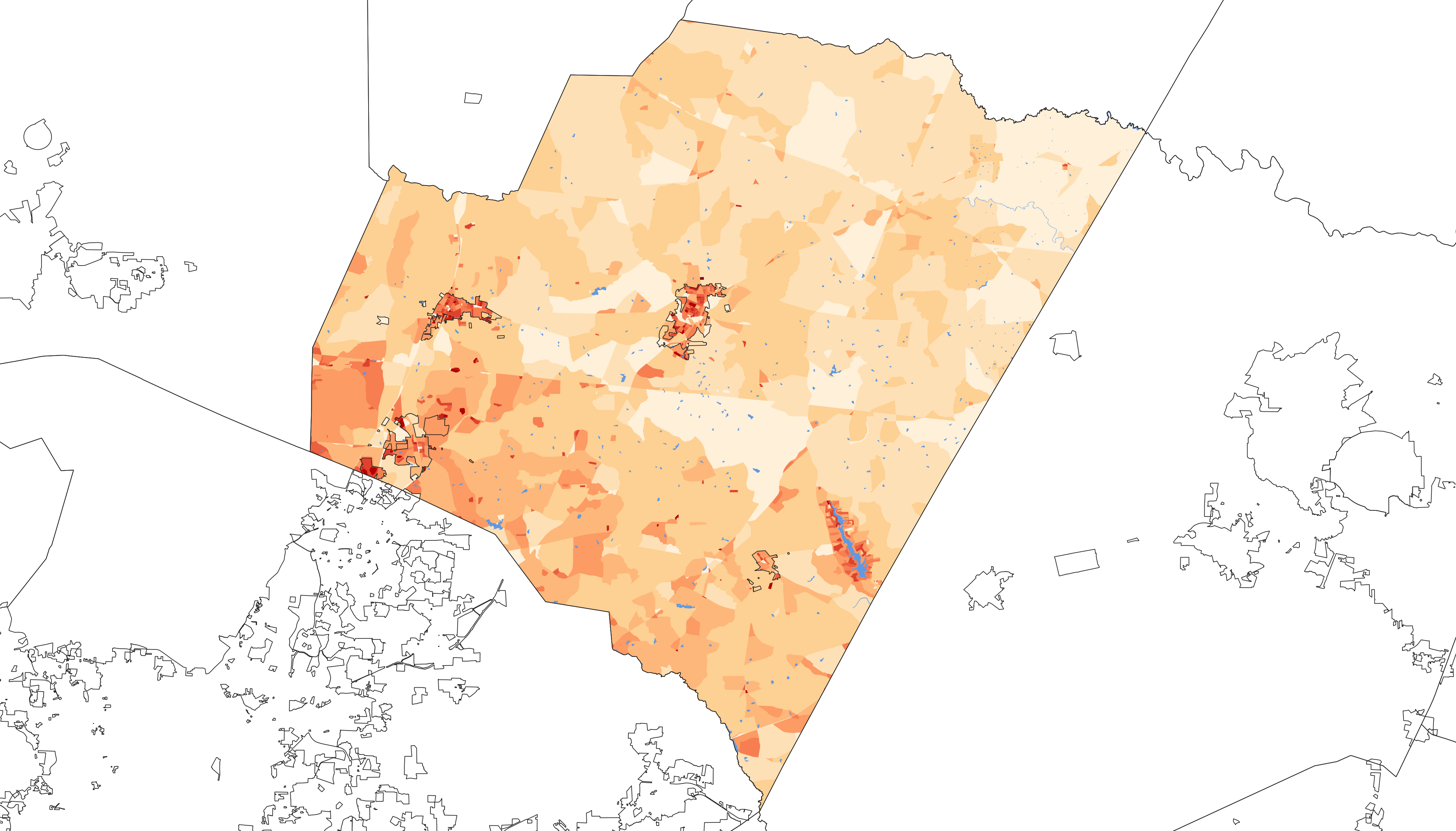
2020 population density of Franklin County NC by census block

=== 2020 census ===
Franklin County, North Carolina – Racial and ethnic composition Note: the US Census treats Hispanic/Latino as an ethnic category. This table excludes Latinos from the racial categories and assigns them to a separate category. Hispanics/Latinos may be of any race.
Race / Ethnicity (NH = Non-Hispanic)	Pop 1980	Pop 1990	Pop 2000	Pop 2010	Pop 2020	% 1980	% 1990	% 2000	% 2010	% 2020
White alone (NH)	17,545	23,197	30,335	38,478	42,285	58.38%	63.70%	64.19%	63.48%	61.66%
Black or African American alone (NH)	12,087	12,791	14,124	15,995	15,785	40.22%	35.13%	29.89%	26.39%	23.02%
Native American or Alaska Native alone (NH)	38	74	182	253	259	0.13%	0.20%	0.39%	0.42%	0.38%
Asian alone (NH)	43	54	137	272	452	0.14%	0.15%	0.29%	0.45%	0.66%
Native Hawaiian or Pacific Islander alone (NH)	x	x	16	5	17	x	x	0.03%	0.01%	0.02%
Other race alone (NH)	12	8	33	67	277	0.04%	0.02%	0.07%	0.11%	0.40%
Mixed race or Multiracial (NH)	x	x	333	773	2,536	x	x	0.70%	1.28%	3.70%
Hispanic or Latino (any race)	330	290	2,100	4,776	6,962	1.10%	0.80%	4.44%	7.88%	10.15%
Total	30,055	36,414	47,260	60,619	68,573	100.00%	100.00%	100.00%	100.00%	100.00%

As of the 2020 census, there were 68,573 people, 26,300 households, and 20,443 families residing in the county. The median age was 41.3 years.

22.5% of residents were under the age of 18 and 17.4% of residents were 65 years of age or older. For every 100 females there were 97.7 males, and for every 100 females age 18 and over there were 96.4 males.

The racial makeup of the county was 63.4% White, 23.3% Black or African American, 0.7% American Indian and Alaska Native, 0.7% Asian, <0.1% Native Hawaiian and Pacific Islander, 6.0% from some other race, and 5.8% from two or more races. Hispanic or Latino residents of any race comprised 10.2% of the population.

21.1% of residents lived in urban areas, while 78.9% lived in rural areas.

There were 26,300 households in the county, of which 31.3% had children under the age of 18 living in them. Of all households, 50.4% were married-couple households, 17.5% were households with a male householder and no spouse or partner present, and 25.9% were households with a female householder and no spouse or partner present. About 25.0% of all households were made up of individuals and 11.0% had someone living alone who was 65 years of age or older. There were 29,358 housing units, of which 10.4% were vacant. Among occupied housing units, 76.6% were owner-occupied and 23.4% were renter-occupied. The homeowner vacancy rate was 1.4% and the rental vacancy rate was 7.0%.

=== 2010 census ===
At the 2010 census, there were 60,619 people, 23,023 households, and 16,317 families residing in the county. The population density was 123 people per square mile (47 people/km^{2}). The racial makeup of the county was 66.0% White, 26.7% Black or African American, 0.5% Native American, 0.5% Asian, 0.0% Pacific Islander, 4.4% from other races, and 1.8% from two or more races. 7.9% of the population were Hispanic or Latino of any race.

There were 23,023 households, out of which 30.2% had children under the age of 18 living with them, 52.3% were married couples living together, 13.4% had a female householder with no husband present, and 29.1% were non-families. 24.2% of all households were made up of individuals, and 8.8% had someone living alone who was 65 years of age or older. The average household size was 2.56 and the average family size was 3.04.

In the county, the population was spread out, with 27.3% under the age of 20, 5.5% from 20 to 24, 26.2% from 25 to 44, 28.5% from 45 to 64, and 12.6% who were 65 years of age or older. The median age was 39.1 years. For every 100 females there were 99.1 males. For every 100 females age 18 and over, there were 97.0 males.

The median income for a household in the county was $41,696, and the median income for a family was $51,353. Males had a median income of $41,025 versus $34,562 for females. The per capita income for the county was $21,399. About 12.3% of families and 16.1% of the population were below the poverty line, including 20.6% of those under age 18 and 13.7% of those age 65 or over.

=== Housing ===
There were 26,577 housing units at an average density of 54 units per square mile (21 units/km^{2}). 13.4% of housing units were vacant.

There were 23,023 occupied housing units in the county. 17,029 were owner-occupied units (74.0%), while 5,994 were renter-occupied (26.0%). The homeowner vacancy rate was 2.4% of total units. The rental unit vacancy rate was 7.6%.

== Law and government ==
Franklin County is governed by an appointed county manager and a seven-member Board of Commissioners who are elected in staggered four-year terms. Five are chosen by district and the other two at-large. Additional county officials who are elected include Sheriff, Register of Deeds, Board of Education and Clerk of Superior Court.

Franklin County is patrolled by the Franklin County Sheriff's Office located in Louisburg. The current sheriff is Kevin White, who was elected in 2022. Bunn, Franklinton, Louisburg and Youngsville have their own municipal police departments, regulated by the respective town governments. The community of Lake Royale near Bunn also has its own police department. Franklin County also is covered by Troop C, District IV of the North Carolina Highway Patrol, located in Henderson, North Carolina.

Franklin County is a member of the Kerr-Tar Regional Council of Governments.

- Interim County Manager: Ryan Preble
- Commissioner (district 1): Logan Davis
- Commissioner (district 2): Roxanne Bragg
- Commissioner (district 3): James Mark Speed
- Commissioner (district 4): David Bunn
- Commissioner (district 5): Michael Schriver
- Commissioner (at-large): Harry L. Foy Jr.
- Commissioner (at-large): Stuart May

=== Politics ===
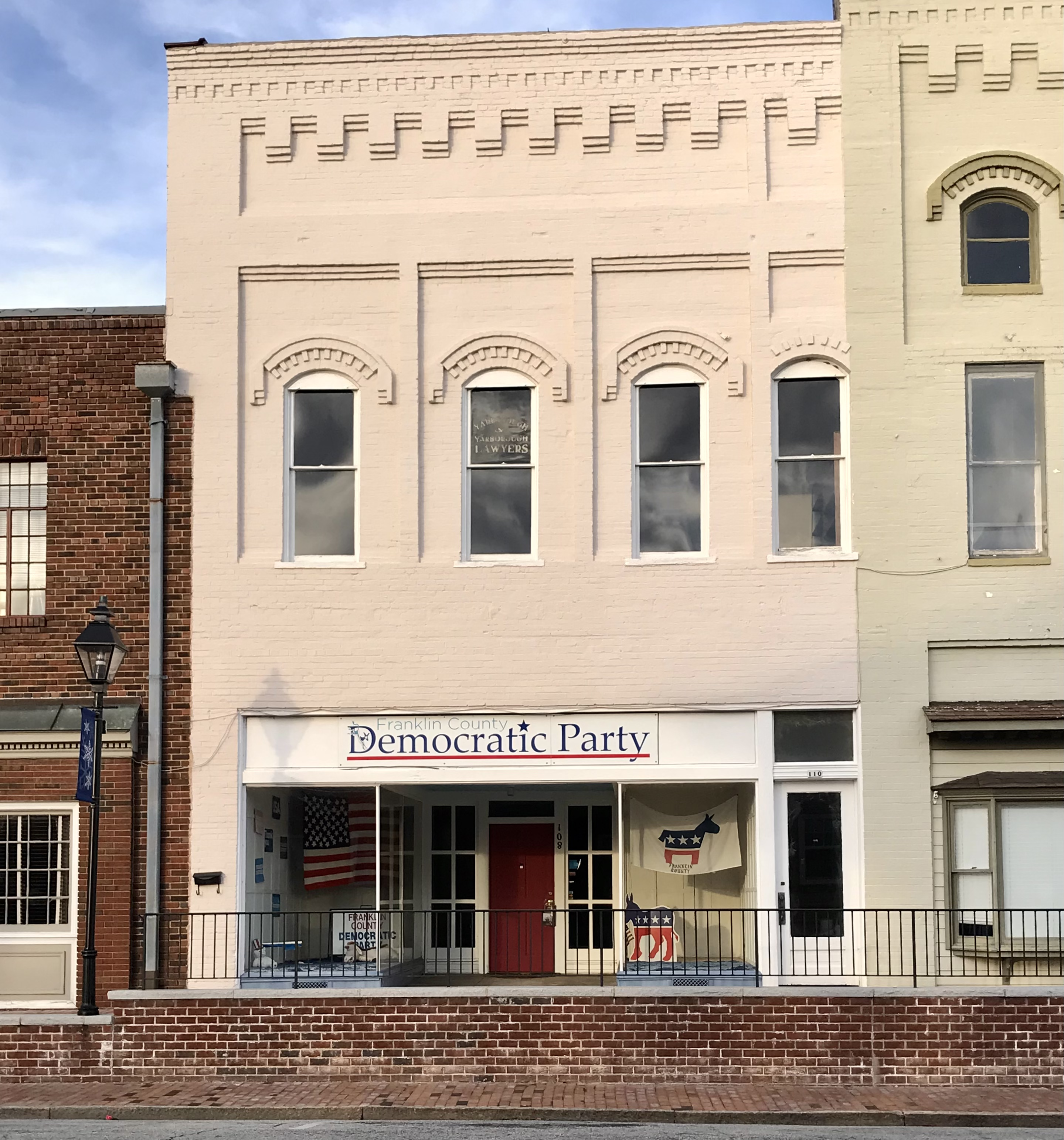
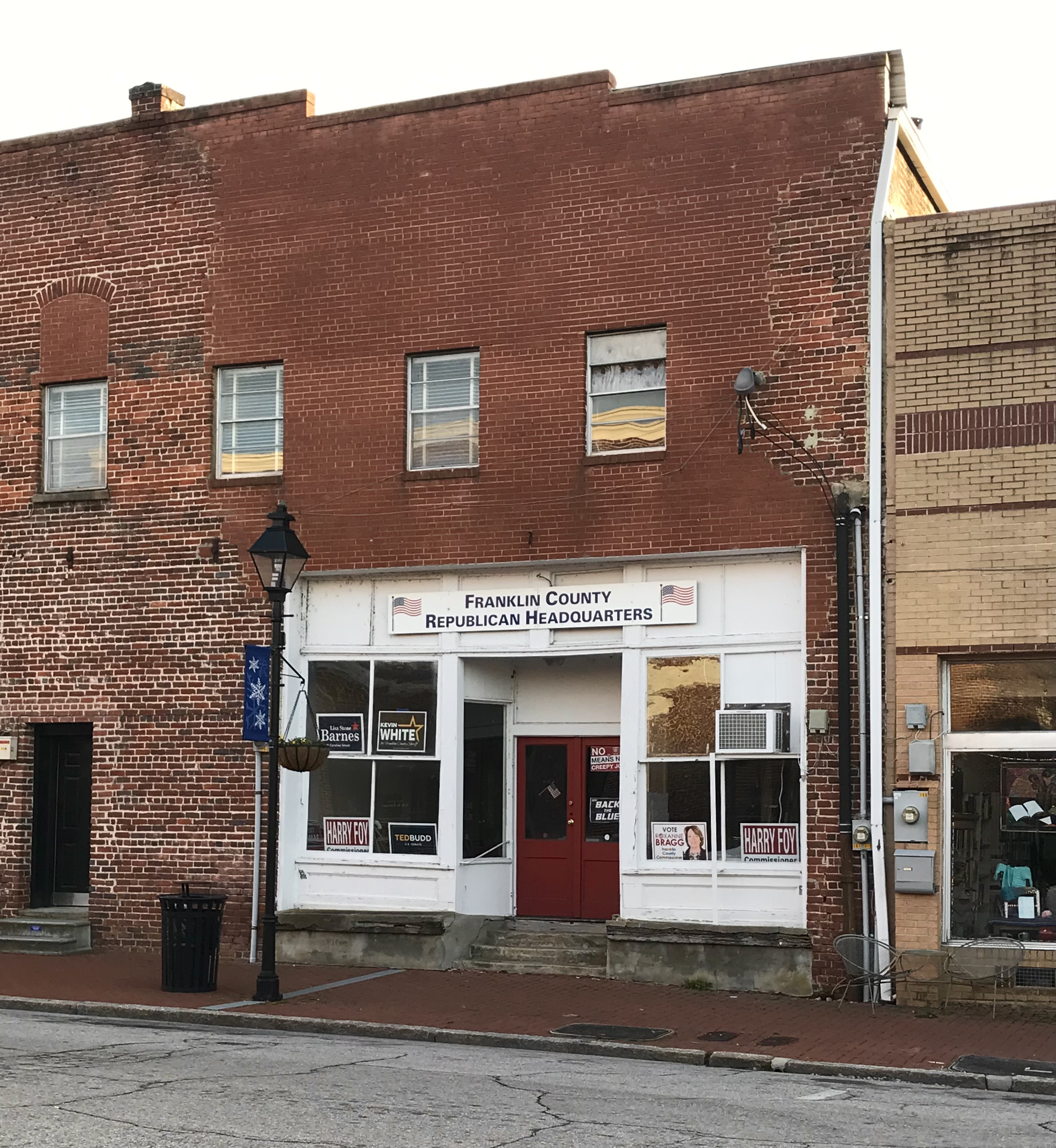
County political party headquarters in Louisburg

United States presidential election results for Franklin County, North Carolina
Year	Republican		Democratic		Third party(ies)	
Year	No.	%	No.	%	No.	%
1912	71	3.12%	1,856	81.62%	347	15.26%
1916	396	16.14%	2,057	83.86%	0	0.00%
1920	589	17.68%	2,742	82.32%	0	0.00%
1924	302	13.10%	1,991	86.34%	13	0.56%
1928	729	20.48%	2,831	79.52%	0	0.00%
1932	199	4.42%	4,294	95.34%	11	0.24%
1936	231	4.25%	5,209	95.75%	0	0.00%
1940	227	4.58%	4,724	95.42%	0	0.00%
1944	289	6.79%	3,967	93.21%	0	0.00%
1948	234	4.72%	4,538	91.55%	185	3.73%
1952	740	12.10%	5,376	87.90%	0	0.00%
1956	792	13.00%	5,298	87.00%	0	0.00%
1960	1,108	17.90%	5,081	82.10%	0	0.00%
1964	2,097	31.53%	4,554	68.47%	0	0.00%
1968	1,375	14.10%	2,855	29.27%	5,525	56.64%
1972	5,431	68.37%	2,341	29.47%	172	2.17%
1976	2,630	32.50%	5,405	66.79%	58	0.72%
1980	3,508	38.63%	5,427	59.76%	146	1.61%
1984	5,984	55.57%	4,766	44.26%	18	0.17%
1988	5,499	50.17%	5,438	49.62%	23	0.21%
1992	4,669	35.20%	6,517	49.13%	2,080	15.68%
1996	5,648	43.36%	6,448	49.50%	930	7.14%
2000	8,501	52.96%	7,454	46.44%	96	0.60%
2004	11,540	55.17%	9,286	44.39%	92	0.44%
2008	13,273	49.83%	13,085	49.12%	281	1.05%
2012	14,603	51.44%	13,436	47.33%	350	1.23%
2016	16,368	53.90%	12,874	42.39%	1,126	3.71%
2020	20,901	55.96%	15,879	42.51%	571	1.53%
2024	23,938	56.10%	18,167	42.58%	562	1.32%

Franklin County, from 1912 until 1964, was a typical Solid South entity, with Democratic presidential candidates nearly always receiving 80 percent or more of the popular vote. George Wallace garnered the majority of the vote in 1968 as a third-party candidate. Beginning in 1972, the county swung in the opposite direction, with the Republican candidate earning the majority of the vote in most elections since.

== Economy ==
The county's economy and population is growing due to its proximity to growth in Wake County.

== Education ==
Franklin County Schools operates 16 schools throughout the county, ranging from pre-kindergarten through twelfth grade. They include four high schools, four middle schools and eight elementary schools.

Franklin County is home to the two-year Methodist-affiliated Louisburg College and to a satellite campus of Vance-Granville Community College.

Youngsville Academy, a college-preparatory, tuition-free charter school, opened in July 2015. Wake Preparatory Academy, a charter school with an enrollment of 750, opened in 2022.

== Communities ==
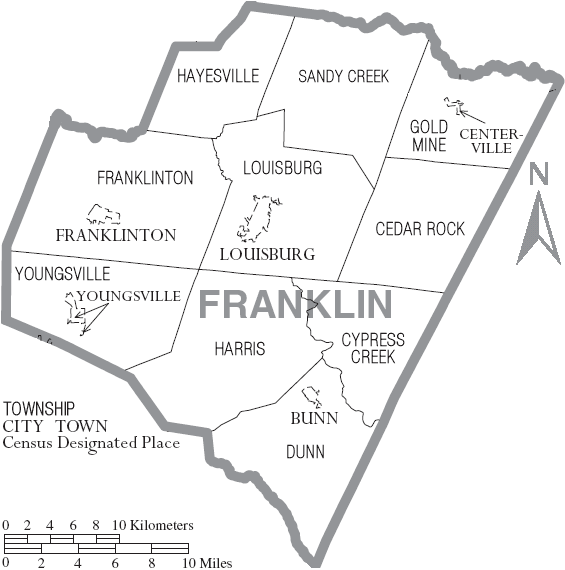
Map of Franklin County with municipal and township labels

=== Towns ===
- Bunn
- Franklinton
- Louisburg (county seat)
- Youngsville
- Wake Forest (part)

=== Census-designated places ===
- Centerville
- Lake Royale (largest community)

=== Unincorporated communities ===
- Alert
- Epsom
- Five Points
- Gold Sand
- Gupton
- Halls Crossroads
- Harris Crossroads
- Hickory Rock
- Ingleside
- Katesville
- Kearney
- Justice
- Laurel Mill
- Mapleville
- Margaret
- Mitchiners Crossroads
- Moulton
- Needmore
- New Hope
- Oswego
- Pearces
- Pilot
- Pine Ridge
- Pocomoke
- Raynor
- Riley
- Rocky Ford
- Royal
- Schloss
- Seven Paths
- Stallings Crossroads
- Sutton
- White Level
- Wilders Corner
- Wood

=== Townships ===
- Cedar Rock
- Cypress Creek
- Dunn
- Franklinton
- Gold Mine
- Harris
- Hayesville
- Louisburg
- Sandy Creek
- Youngsville

== See also ==
- List of counties in North Carolina
- National Register of Historic Places listings in Franklin County, North Carolina
- Haliwa-Saponi, state-recognized tribe that resides in the county
