= Bunn, North Carolina =

- Town
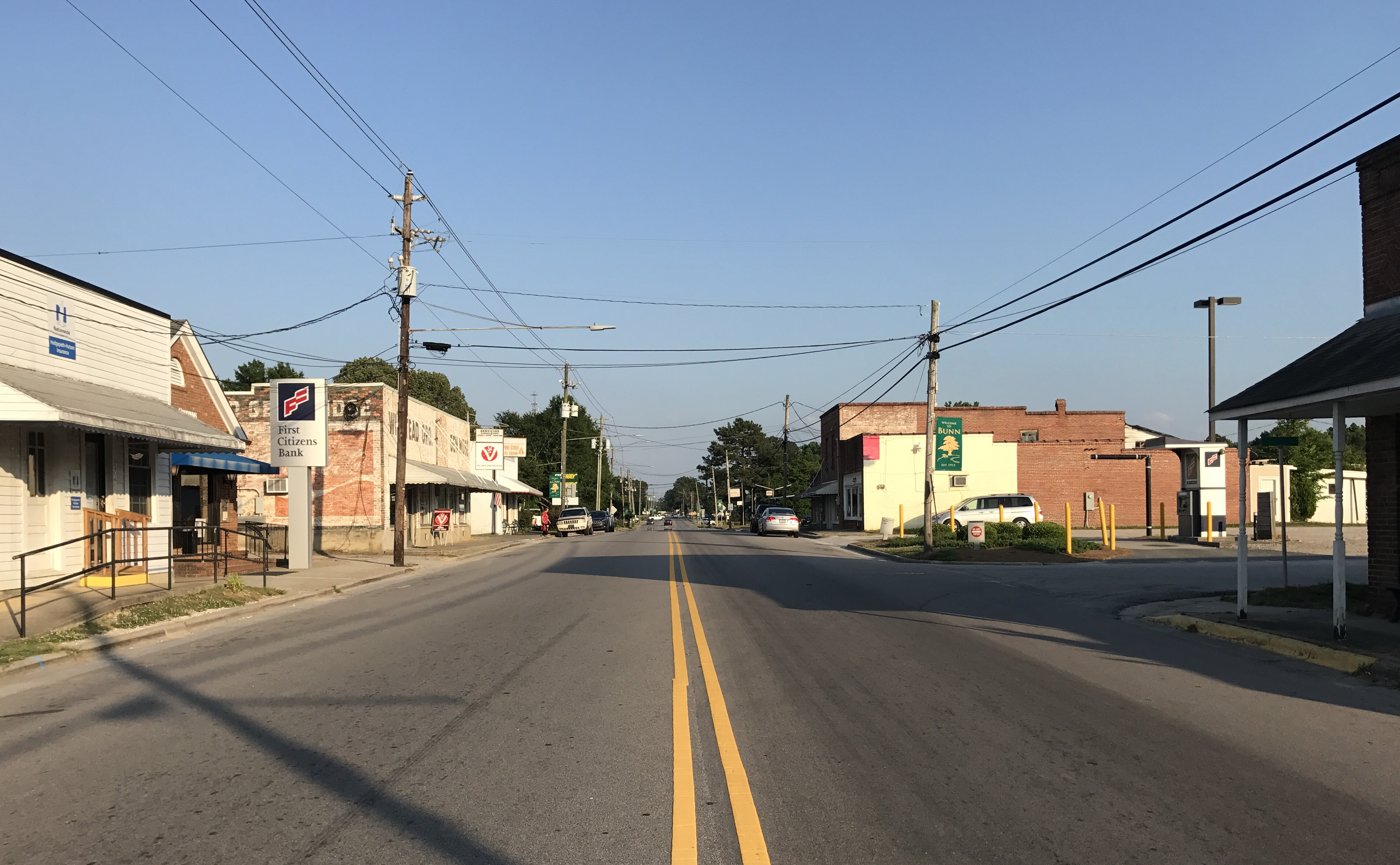

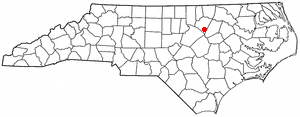
- Location of Bunn, North Carolina
- Coordinates: 35°57′30″N 78°14′53″W
- Country: United States
- State: North Carolina
- County: Franklin
- Established: 1909
- Incorporated: March 3, 1913
- Named after: Green Walker Bunn

Government
  - Type: Board of Commissioners
  - Mayor: Marsha W. Strawbridge (R)

Area
  - Total: 0.54 sq mi (1.40 km^{2})
  - Land: 0.54 sq mi (1.40 km^{2})
  - Water: 0 sq mi (0.00 km^{2})
- Elevation: 282 ft (86 m)

Population (2020)
  - Total: 327
  - Density: 606.0/sq mi (233.98/km^{2})
- Time zone: UTC-5 (Eastern (EST))
  - Summer (DST): UTC-4 (EDT)
- ZIP code: 27508
- Area codes: 919 and 984
- FIPS code: 37-08860
- GNIS feature ID: 2405343
- Website: https://www.townofbunn.org

Bunn is a town in Franklin County, North Carolina, United States. The population was 327 at the 2020 census.

== History ==
Bunn is named for Green Walker Bunn, who first settled southeast of the current town in the late 1800s. The town was established on land purchased around 1909 by the Montgomery Lumber Company and incorporated four years later.

The Andrews-Moore House and Baker Farm are listed on the National Register of Historic Places.

== Geography ==
Bunn is located in southeastern Franklin County. North Carolina Highway 98 passes through the town, leading southeastward 6 miles (10 km) to U.S. Route 64 and west 15 miles (24 km) to Wake Forest. North Carolina Highway 39 intersects NC 98 in the center of town; it leads north 10 miles (16 km) to Louisburg, the Franklin County seat, and south 7 miles (11 km) to US 64 east of Zebulon. NC 98 and 39 combine to form South Main Street in the center of Bunn.

According to the United States Census Bureau, the town has a total area of 0.54 square miles (1.4 km^{2}), all land.

== Demographics ==
Historical population
Census	Pop.	Note	%±
1920	150		—
1930	243		62.0%
1940	248		2.1%
1950	255		2.8%
1960	332		30.2%
1970	284		−14.5%
1980	505		77.8%
1990	364		−27.9%
2000	357		−1.9%
2010	344		−3.6%
2020	327		−4.9%
2023 (est.)	361	▲	10.4%
U.S. Decennial Census

=== 2020 census ===
Bunn racial composition
Race	Number	Percentage
White (non-Hispanic)	186	56.88%
Black or African American (non-Hispanic)	81	24.77%
Native American	3	0.92%
Asian	2	0.61%
Other/Mixed	20	6.12%
Hispanic or Latino	35	10.7%

As of the 2020 United States census, there were 327 people, 135 households, and 79 families residing in the town.

=== 2010 census ===
As of the census of 2010, there were 344 people, 157 households, and 97 families residing in the town. The population density was 688.0 inhabitants per square mile (265.6/km^{2}). The racial makeup of the town was 66.6% White, 28.2% African American, 0.6% Native American, 0.0% Asian, 2.0% from other races, and 2.6% from two or more races. Hispanic or Latino of any race were 10.2% of the population.

There were 157 households, out of which 20.4% had children under the age of 18 living with them, 45.9% were married couples living together, 10.2% had a female householder with no husband present, and 38.2% were non-families. 36.3% of all households were made up of individuals, and 18.4% had someone living alone who was 65 years of age or older. The average household size was 2.19 and the average family size was 2.79.

In the town, the population was spread out, with 22.1% under the age of 20, 5.5% from 20 to 24, 20.4% from 25 to 44, 34.6% from 45 to 64, and 17.4% who were 65 years of age or older. The median age was 48.0 years. For every 100 females, there were 79.2 males. For every 100 females age 18 and over, there were 79.6 males.

The median income for a household in the town was $36,591, and the median income for a family was $56,875. Males had a median income of $43,485 versus $37,250 for females. The per capita income for the town was $17,183. About 6.1% of families and 7.4% of the population were below the poverty line, including 4.8% of those under age 18 and 17.9% of those age 65 or over.

=== Housing ===
There were 207 housing units at an average density of 414.0 per square mile (159.8/km^{2}). 24.2% of housing units were vacant.

There were 157 occupied housing units in the town. 75 were owner-occupied units (47.8%), while 82 were renter-occupied (52.2%). The homeowner vacancy rate was 1.3% of total units. The rental unit vacancy rate was 21.9%.

== Government ==
Bunn is governed by a mayor and four-member Board of Commissioners, who are elected in staggered four-year terms.

== Agriculture ==
The town is surrounded by farms where surrounding acres of land are filled with tobacco and soybean farms. Some fields are farmed directly by families that have been in the area for generations, while other acres are leased. The pick-your-own fields in the area draw visitors to Bunn during the spring and summer.

== Notable person ==
- Tarik Cohen - NFL running back for the Chicago Bears; also known as "The Human Joystick" for his speed and agility on the field.
