= National Register of Historic Places listings in Franklin County, North Carolina =

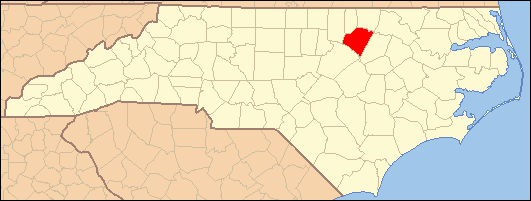

This list includes properties and districts listed on the National Register of Historic Places in Franklin County, North Carolina. Click the "Map of all coordinates" link to the right to view an online map of all properties and districts with latitude and longitude coordinates in the table below.

== Current listings ==
This National Park Service list is complete through NPS recent listings posted September 4, 2026.

	Name on the Register	Image	Date listed	Location	City or town	Description
1	Andrews-Moore House	Andrews-Moore House	December 10, 1998 (#98001506)	95 Simon Collie Rd. 36°00′09″N 78°11′14″W	Bunn	House burned on March 29, 2006, causing significant damage, but was able to be repaired.
2	Baker Farm		October 5, 1982 (#82001297)	SW of Bunn on SR 1720; 35°56′59″N 78°18′50″W	Bunn	
3	Cascine	Cascine	April 26, 1973 (#73001342)	S of Louisburg on SR 1702; also the northern side of NC 1702; 36°02′21″N 78°19′25″W	Louisburg	Second set of boundaries represents a boundary increase of December 4, 1985
4	Clifton House and Mill Site		April 17, 1980 (#80002835)	SR 1103; 36°00′05″N 78°21′00″W	Royal	
5	Concord School	Concord School	May 31, 2018 (#100002517)	645 Walter Grissom Rd. 36°09′47″N 78°22′46″W	Kittrell	
6	Cooke House		October 14, 1975 (#75001265)	SW of Louisburg near jct. of SR 1114 and SR 1109; 36°03′19″N 78°20′23″W	Louisburg	
7	Archibald H. Davis Plantation		July 24, 1975 (#75001266)	SE of Louisburg off NC 581; 36°03′12″N 78°11′45″W	Justice	
8	Dean Farm		May 2, 1975 (#75001267)	6 miles E of Louisburg on NC 56; 36°05′21″N 78°10′46″W	Louisburg	
9	Franklin County Training School-Riverside Union School	Franklin County Training School-Riverside Union School	January 4, 2012 (#11001011)	53 W. River Rd. 36°05′40″N 78°18′21″W	Louisburg	
10	Franklinton Depot	Franklinton Depot	December 27, 1990 (#90001941)	201 E. Mason St. 36°06′11″N 78°27′20″W	Franklinton	
11	Fuller House	Fuller House	November 17, 1978 (#78001954)	307 N. Main St. 36°06′13″N 78°17′58″W	Louisburg	
12	Green Hill House	Green Hill House	June 10, 1975 (#75001268)	S of Louisburg near jct. of SR 1760 and 1761; 36°04′51″N 78°18′19″W	Louisburg	
13	Dr. J. H. Harris House	Dr. J. H. Harris House	August 1, 1975 (#75001260)	312 E. Mason St. 36°06′15″N 78°27′04″W	Franklinton	Currently called The Carolina Manor House, a special events venue.
14	William A. Jeffreys House		June 23, 1976 (#76001323)	SE of Youngsville on SR 1101; 35°57′22″N 78°23′41″W	Youngsville	
15	Jones-Wright House		March 12, 1992 (#92000149)	NC 1003 W side, 0.2 miles S of jct. with NC 1252; 36°12′44″N 78°20′54″W	Rocky Ford	
16	Shemuel Kearney House	Shemuel Kearney House	June 5, 1975 (#75001261)	1 miles S of Franklinton on U.S. 1; 36°04′36″N 78°28′53″W	Franklinton	House was moved to Louisburg in 2009.
17	Laurel Mill and Col. Jordan Jones House	Laurel Mill and Col. Jordan Jones House	May 30, 1975 (#75001262)	SW of Gupton at jct. of SR 1432 and 1436; 36°10′40″N 78°11′30″W	Gupton	
18	Locust Grove		November 20, 1975 (#75001269)	N of Louisburg on U.S. 401; 36°10′31″N 78°17′26″W	Ingleside	
19	Louisburg Historic District	Louisburg Historic District	February 18, 1987 (#87000041)	Roughly bounded by Allen Lane, Main and Cedar Sts., Franklin, Elm, and King St. 36°06′12″N 78°17′57″W	Louisburg	
20	Main Building, Louisburg College	Main Building, Louisburg College	December 8, 1978 (#78001955)	Louisburg College campus 36°06′17″N 78°18′00″W	Louisburg	
21	Massenburg Plantation		July 30, 1975 (#75001270)	Address Restricted; also 821 NC 561; 36°07′06″N 78°16′08″W	Louisburg	821 NC 561 represents a boundary increase of March 15, 2000
22	C.L. and Bessie G. McGhee House	C.L. and Bessie G. McGhee House	September 5, 2007 (#07000903)	103 W. Mason St. 36°06′14″N 78°27′33″W	Franklinton	
23	Monreath		August 6, 1975 (#75001264)	S of Ingleside on NC 39; 36°10′00″N 78°17′34″W	Ingleside	
24	Oak Grove		September 8, 2026 (#100013392)	4026 US 401 HWY N 36°10′54″N 78°17′06″W	Louisburg	
25	Pearce-Stallings-Massey House		December 30, 2020 (#100005997)	4430 Old US 64; 35°52′48″N 78°16′17″W	Pilot vicinity	
26	Dr. Samuel Perry House	Dr. Samuel Perry House	June 5, 1975 (#75001263)	East of Gupton on SR 1436; 36°11′52″N 78°09′06″W	Gupton	
27	Perry School		January 3, 2011 (#10001110)	2266 Laurel Mill-Centerville Rd. 36°11′35″N 78°07′28″W	Centerville	
28	Person Place	Person Place	June 19, 1972 (#72000962)	603 N. Main St. 36°06′22″N 78°17′46″W	Louisburg	
29	Person-McGhee Farm	Person-McGhee Farm	June 26, 1979 (#79003343)	US 1; 36°09′36″N 78°27′11″W	Franklinton	
30	Portridge	Portridge	March 1, 1990 (#90000351)	SR 1224, 0.3 miles N of jct. with NC 56; 36°05′25″N 78°21′04″W	Louisburg	
31	Rose Hill		May 3, 2006 (#06000339)	W side of US 401 S, 0.25 miles N of NC 1110; 36°04′15″N 78°19′54″W	Louisburg	
32	Dr. J. A. Savage House		September 22, 1980 (#80002834)	124 College St. 36°05′56″N 78°27′27″W	Franklinton	House was demolished in 1997.
33	Speed Farm		December 27, 1991 (#91001907)	W side NC 1436 between NC 1432 and NC 1434; 36°11′17″N 78°11′26″W	Gupton	
34	Sterling Cotton Mill	Sterling Cotton Mill	May 16, 1996 (#96000568)	SE jct. of Seabord RR tracks and E. Green St. 36°05′59″N 78°27′25″W	Franklinton	
35	Archibald Taylor House		May 12, 1975 (#75001273)	Address Restricted	Wood	
36	Patty Person Taylor House	Patty Person Taylor House	February 13, 1975 (#75001271)	Address Restricted	Louisburg	
37	Aldridge H. Vann House	Aldridge H. Vann House	January 9, 2008 (#07001373)	115 N Main St. 36°06′20″N 78°27′23″W	Franklinton	
38	Vine Hill		May 28, 1975 (#75001259)	Address Restricted	Centerville	
39	Thomas and Lois Wheless House	Thomas and Lois Wheless House	August 28, 2007 (#07000887)	106 John St. 36°06′01″N 78°17′44″W	Louisburg	
40	Williamson House	Williamson House	June 20, 1975 (#75001272)	401 Cedar St. 36°06′03″N 78°17′45″W	Louisburg	

== See also ==
- National Register of Historic Places listings in North Carolina
- List of National Historic Landmarks in North Carolina
