= Laurel Mill, North Carolina =

Unincorporated community in North Carolina, US

Coordinates: 36°10′48″N 78°11′19″W

Laurel Mill, also known as just Laurel, is an unincorporated community in northeastern Franklin County, North Carolina, United States.

It is located west of Centerville, at an elevation of 292 feet (89 m). The primary cross roads where the community is located are Laurel Mill-Centerville Road (SR 1436), Jones Chapel Road (SR 1432) and Laurel Mill Road (SR 1436).

Laurel Mill and Col. Jordan Jones House and Speed Farm, located in Laurel Mill, are listed on the National Register of Historic Places.
