= Shemuel Kearney House =

Historic 18th-century house in North Carolina, USA

- U.S. National Register of Historic Places
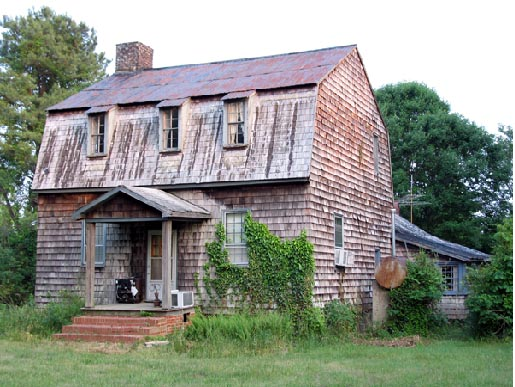
- The Shemuel Kearney House at its original location near Franklinton, North Carolina before being moved.

- Location within North Carolina Location within the United States
- Location: 1 miles S of Franklinton on U.S. 1, near Franklinton, North Carolina
- Coordinates: 36°4′36″N 78°28′53″W
- Area: 8 acres (3.2 ha)
- Built: 1790
- Built by: Kearney, Shemuel
- Architectural style: Georgian
- NRHP reference No.: 75001261
- Added to NRHP: June 5, 1975

Shemuel Kearney House was a historic plantation house located near Franklinton, Franklin County, North Carolina, formerly at 2555 U.S. Highway 1 south of town. In 2009, the house was dismantled and moved to nearby Louisburg for restoration as the original property was recently zoned by Franklin County for commercial use. Therefore, the building had to be relocated. The Shemuel Kearney House was reconstructed next to another historic residence, the Cooke House, on Peach Orchard Road in 2015.

Although the National Register of Historic Places lists the house as being built in 1790, it was actually constructed in 1759 by Shemuel Kearney (1734–1808) and is currently the second oldest residence in Franklin County after Cascine Plantation which was built in 1752. The home consists of a 1 1/2-story, three-bay, gambrel roofed main block with a later one-story, gable roofed rear wing. It has a simple, robust Georgian style finish.

It was listed on the National Register of Historic Places in 1975.
