= Rocky Ford, North Carolina =

Unincorporated community in North Carolina, US

Coordinates: 36°12′00″N 78°20′36″W

Rocky Ford is an unincorporated community in Franklin County, North Carolina, United States. It is located at an elevation of 397 feet or 121 m, it is west-northwest of the neighboring unincorporated community of Ingleside.

Jones-Wright House was listed on the National Register of Historic Places in 1992.
