= Gupton, North Carolina =

- Unincorporated community
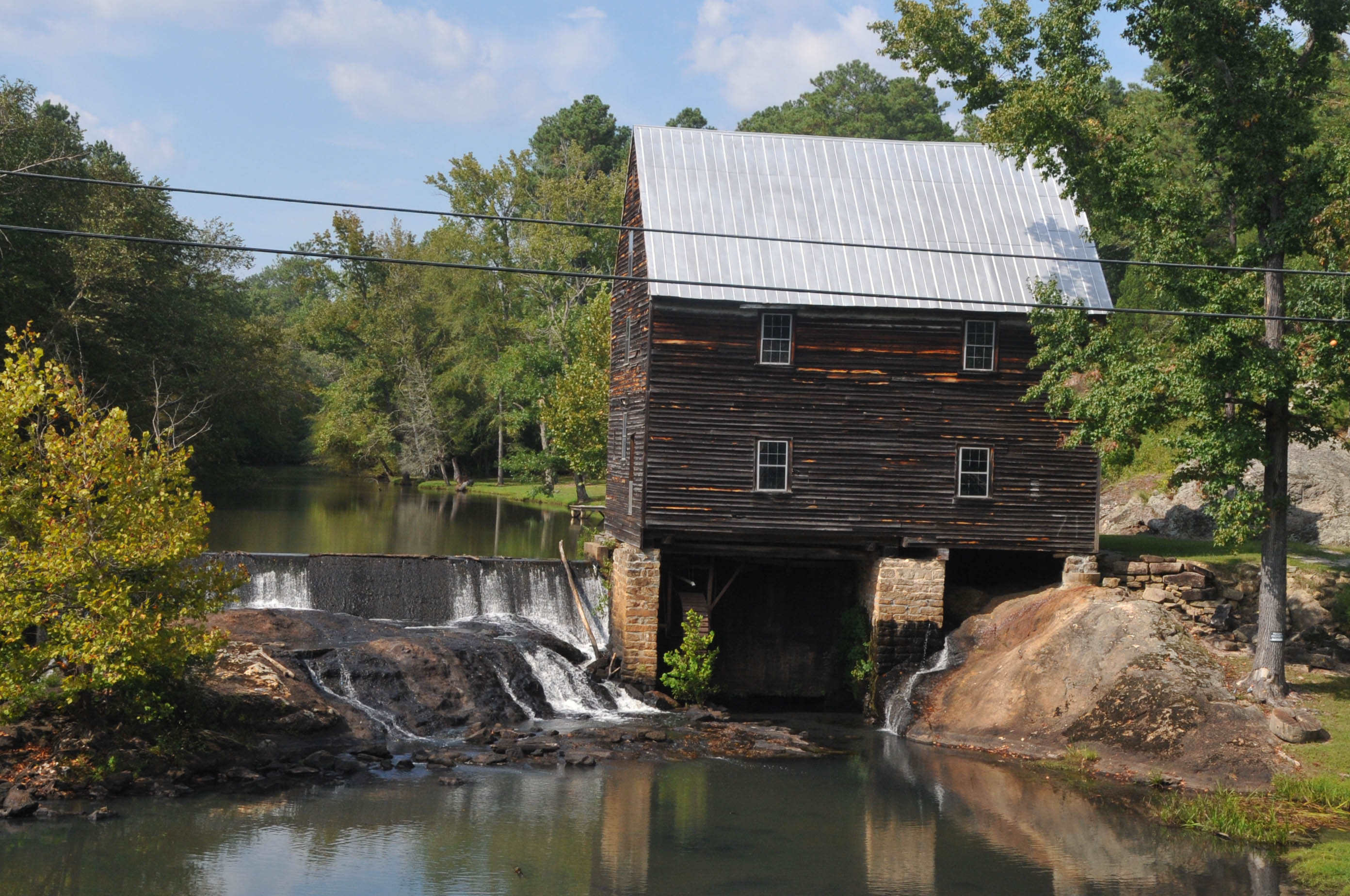
- Laurel Mill

- Location of Gupton in North Carolina Gupton (the United States)
- Coordinates: 36°11′49″N 78°09′38″W
- Country: United States
- State: North Carolina
- County: Franklin
- Elevation: 374 ft (114 m)
- Time zone: UTC-5 (Eastern (EST))
  - Summer (DST): UTC-4 (EDT)
- Area code: 919
- GNIS feature ID: 1006226

Gupton is an unincorporated community in Franklin County, North Carolina, United States.

Gupton is located approximately eight miles east-northeast of Ingleside, off North Carolina Highway 561.

Laurel Mill and Col. Jordan Jones House, Dr. Samuel Perry House, and Speed Farm are listed on the National Register of Historic Places.
