= Locust Grove (Ingleside, North Carolina) =

Historic house in North Carolina, United States

- U.S. National Register of Historic Places
- Location within North Carolina Location within the United States
- Location: N of Louisburg on U.S. 401, Ingleside, North Carolina
- Coordinates: 36°10′31″N 78°17′26″W
- Area: 9 acres (3.6 ha)
- Built: c. 1790
- Architectural style: Georgian
- NRHP reference No.: 75001269
- Added to NRHP: November 20, 1975

Locust Grove, also known as the Foster House, is a historic plantation house located at Ingleside, Franklin County, North Carolina. It was built about 1790, and is a two-story, five-bay, Georgian style frame dwelling with a high gable roof. It has a rear ell to form a T-shaped plan. From 1797 to 1809, it was owned by noted American politician John Haywood (1754-1827), who was the longest-serving North Carolina State Treasurer.

It was listed on the National Register of Historic Places in 1975.
