= Fuller House (Louisburg, North Carolina) =

Historic house in North Carolina, United States

- U.S. National Register of Historic Places
- U.S. Historic district – Contributing property
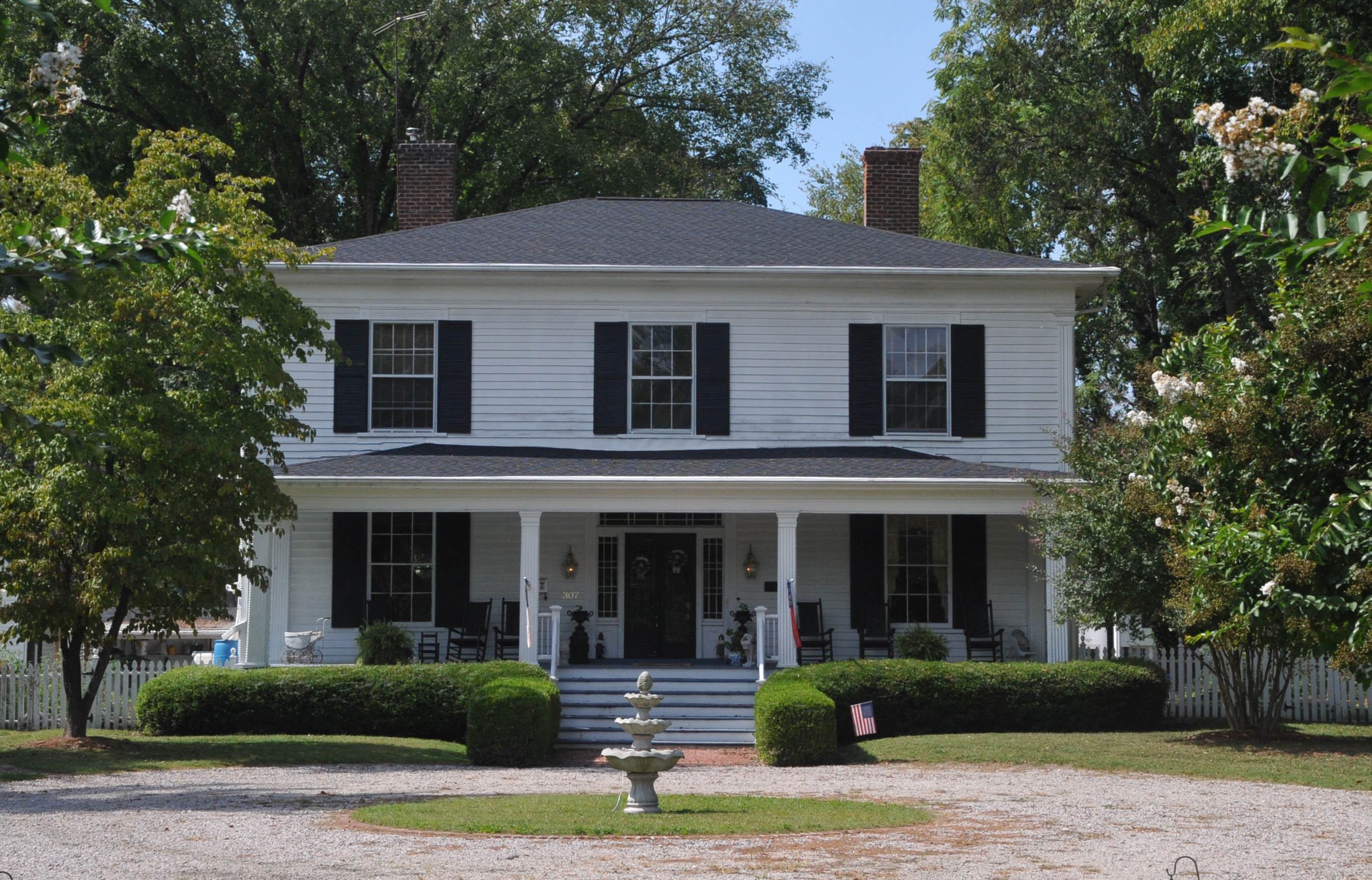
- Fuller House, March 2007

- Location within North Carolina Location within the United States
- Location: 307 N. Main St., Louisburg, North Carolina
- Coordinates: 36°6′13″N 78°17′58″W
- Area: 1.5 acres (0.61 ha)
- Built: 1856
- Built by: Albert Gamaliel Jones
- Architectural style: Greek Revival
- NRHP reference No.: 78001954
- Added to NRHP: November 17, 1978

Fuller House is a historic home located at Louisburg, Franklin County, North Carolina. It was built in 1856, and is a two-story, three bay by two bay, Greek Revival style frame dwelling. It has a hipped roof and rests on a low foundation of stone blocks. The front facade features a full-width front porch. It was the home of noted poet and novelist Edwin Wiley Fuller (1847–1876).

It was listed on the National Register of Historic Places in 1978. It is located in the Louisburg Historic District.

== Edwin Wiley Fuller ==
Fuller was born in Louisburg, North Carolina and wrote the novels The Angel in the Cloud (1873) and Sea-Gift (1871). A historical marker commemorating his life and work is four blocks east of the home. He married Elisabeth Malone and had two daughters before dying at age 28.
