= Cooke House (Louisburg, North Carolina) =

Historic house in North Carolina, United States

- U.S. National Register of Historic Places
- Location within North Carolina Location within the United States
- Location: SW of Louisburg near jct. of SR 1114 and SR 1109, near Louisburg, North Carolina
- Coordinates: 36°3′19″N 78°20′23″W
- Area: 5 acres (2.0 ha)
- Built: 1841
- Architectural style: Greek Revival
- NRHP reference No.: 75001265
- Added to NRHP: October 14, 1975

Cooke House is a historic plantation house located near Louisburg, Franklin County, North Carolina. The house was built about 1841, and consists of a two-story, three-bay, Greek Revival style frame main block with a smaller earlier one-story section. It has brick exterior end chimneys with stepped shoulders and a wide hip-roof front porch. It was built by Jonas Cooke (1786-1872), whose son Charles M. Cooke (1844-1920) was a noted North Carolina politician.

It was listed on the National Register of Historic Places in 1975.

The historic Shemuel Kearney House (built 1759), originally located in Franklinton, currently sits next to the Cooke House. It was moved there in 2009 and reconstructed in 2015.
