= Green Hill House =

Plantation house in Franklin County, North Carolina

- U.S. National Register of Historic Places
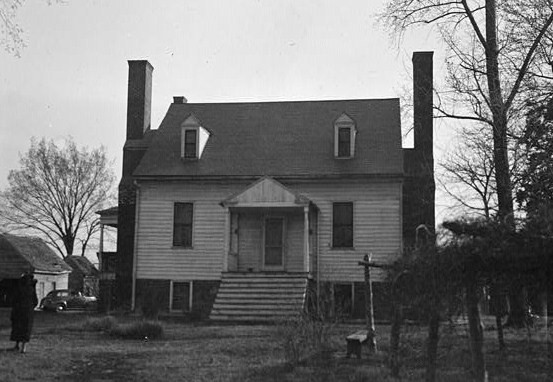
- Green Hill Place, HABS Photo

- Location within North Carolina Location within the United States
- Location: S of Louisburg near jct. of SR 1760 and 1761, near Louisburg, North Carolina
- Coordinates: 36°4′51″N 78°18′19″W
- Area: 9.5 acres (3.8 ha)
- Built: c. 1788
- Built by: Hill, Green
- Architectural style: Georgian
- NRHP reference No.: 75001268
- Added to NRHP: June 10, 1975

Green Hill House is a historic plantation house located near Louisburg, Franklin County, North Carolina. It was built prior to 1785, and is a 1 1/2-story, three-bay, Georgian style frame dwelling. It sits on a raised basement and has a rear shed extension. The house features large double-shoulder brick end chimneys. Green Hill (1741-1828) was active in the Methodist movement and his house was the scene in 1785 of the first annual conference of the newly organized Methodist Episcopal Church, attended by Bishop Francis Asbury and Bishop Thomas Coke.

It was listed on the National Register of Historic Places in 1975.
