= Archibald Taylor House =

Historic house in North Carolina, United States

- U.S. National Register of Historic Places
- Nearest city: Wood, North Carolina
- Area: 20 acres (8.1 ha)
- Built: c. 1856
- Built by: Holt, Jacob
- Architectural style: Italianate
- NRHP reference No.: 75001273
- Added to NRHP: May 12, 1975

Archibald Taylor House is a historic plantation house located near Wood, Franklin County, North Carolina. It was built about 1857, and is a two-story, three-bay, Italianate style frame dwelling. It rests on a full-height brick basement and has a hipped roof. The house has a center-hall plan and the front hall retains trompe-l'œil painting. It was built by noted American carpenter and builder Jacob W. Holt (1811–1880).

It was listed on the National Register of Historic Places in 1975.

There is reason to believe that Archibald Taylor was a slave owner - this should be reflected into his background and history - as evidenced by this article (https://zora.medium.com/my-relentless-search-to-find-my-familys-african-american-eve-2e5b40aeb0b8)
