= Louisburg Historic District =

Historic district in North Carolina, United States

- U.S. National Register of Historic Places
- U.S. Historic district
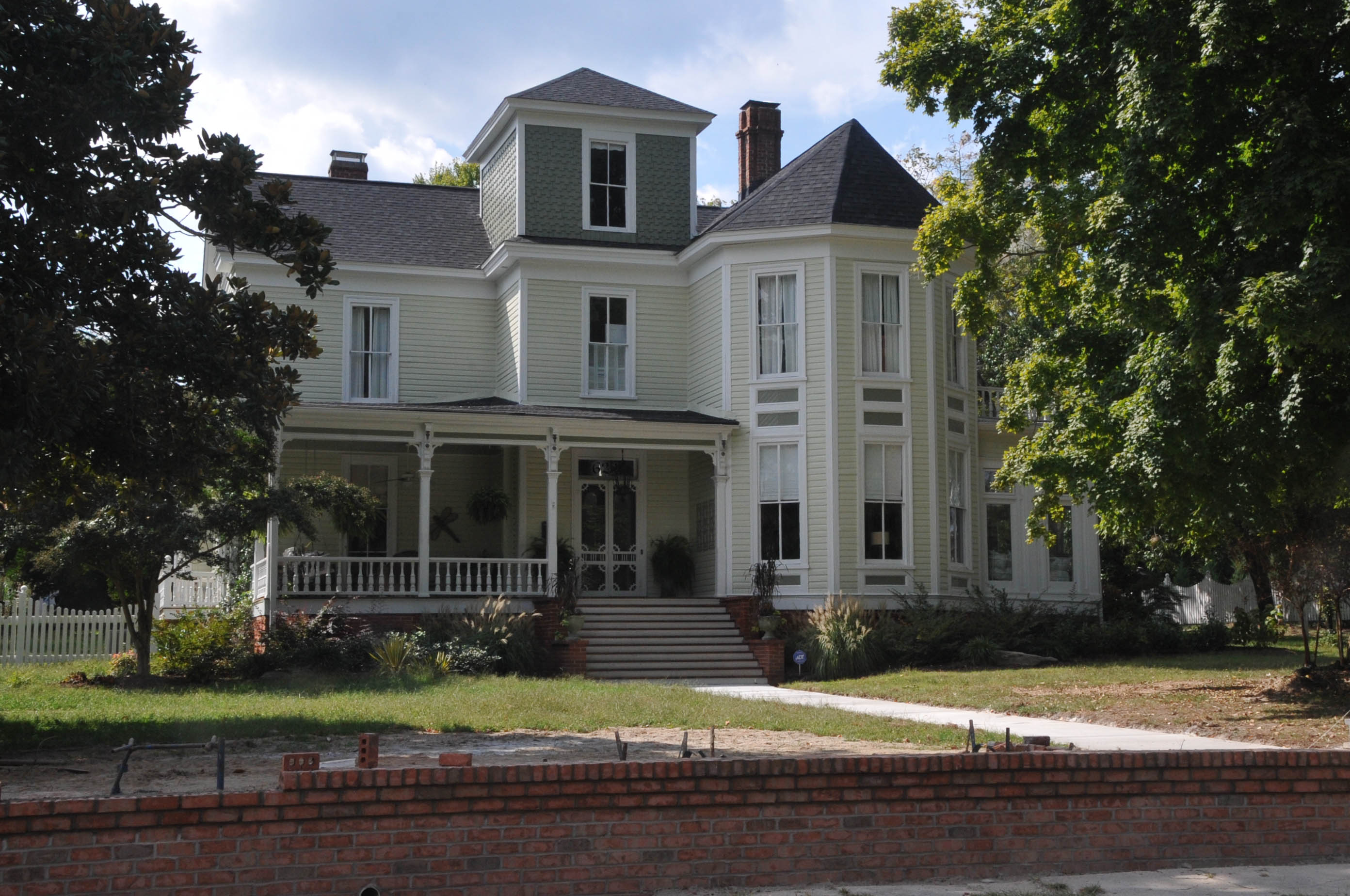
- Nicholson-Bickett-Taylor House, Louisburg Historic District, March 2007

- Location within North Carolina Location within the United States
- Location: Roughly bounded by Allen Lane, Main and Cedar Sts., Franklin, Elm, and King St., Louisburg, North Carolina
- Coordinates: 36°6′12″N 78°17′57″W
- Area: 168 acres (68 ha)
- Built by: Jones, Albert Gamaliel; et al.
- Architectural style: Late 19th And 20th Century Revivals, Bungalow/craftsman, Late Victorian
- NRHP reference No.: 87000041
- Added to NRHP: February 18, 1987

Louisburg Historic District is a national historic district located at Louisburg, Franklin County, North Carolina. The district encompasses 206 contributing buildings, 1 contributing site, 6 contributing structures, and 1 contributing object in residential sections of Louisburg included in the original 1779 town plan. It also includes a section of Louisburg College located on the old Town Commons.

Dwellings date between about 1800 and the 1920s and include notable examples of popular architectural styles including Federal / Georgian, Italianate / Greek Revival, Queen Anne, Colonial Revival, Late Victorian, and Bungalow / American Craftsman.

Located in the district and separately listed are the Fuller House, Williamson House, and Main Building, Louisburg College.

Other notable buildings include the Shine-King House (c. 1800), Milner-Perry-Boddie-Dennis House (c. 1779), Dr. J.B. Clifton House (c. 1865), The Edgerton-Pruitt House (c. 1905), The Furgurson-Hicks House (c. 1908), Nicholson-Bickett-Taylor House (c. 1897), The Hughes-Watson-Wheless House (c. 1900), Bailey-Yarborough House (c. 1895), The Barrow House (c. 1888–1890), The Neal-Webb House (c. 1904), The Milner-Williams-Person Place (c. 1789–1830), Former Rectory-St. Paul's Episcopal Church, Hicks-Perry-Bland-Holmes House (c. 1914), Malcomb McKinne House (c. 1922) First Baptist Church (1927), Louisburg United Methodist Church (1900), and Louisburg Baptist Church (1901–1904).

It was listed on the National Register of Historic Places in 1987.
