= Williamson House (Louisburg, North Carolina) =

Historic house in North Carolina, United States

- U.S. National Register of Historic Places
- U.S. Historic district – Contributing property
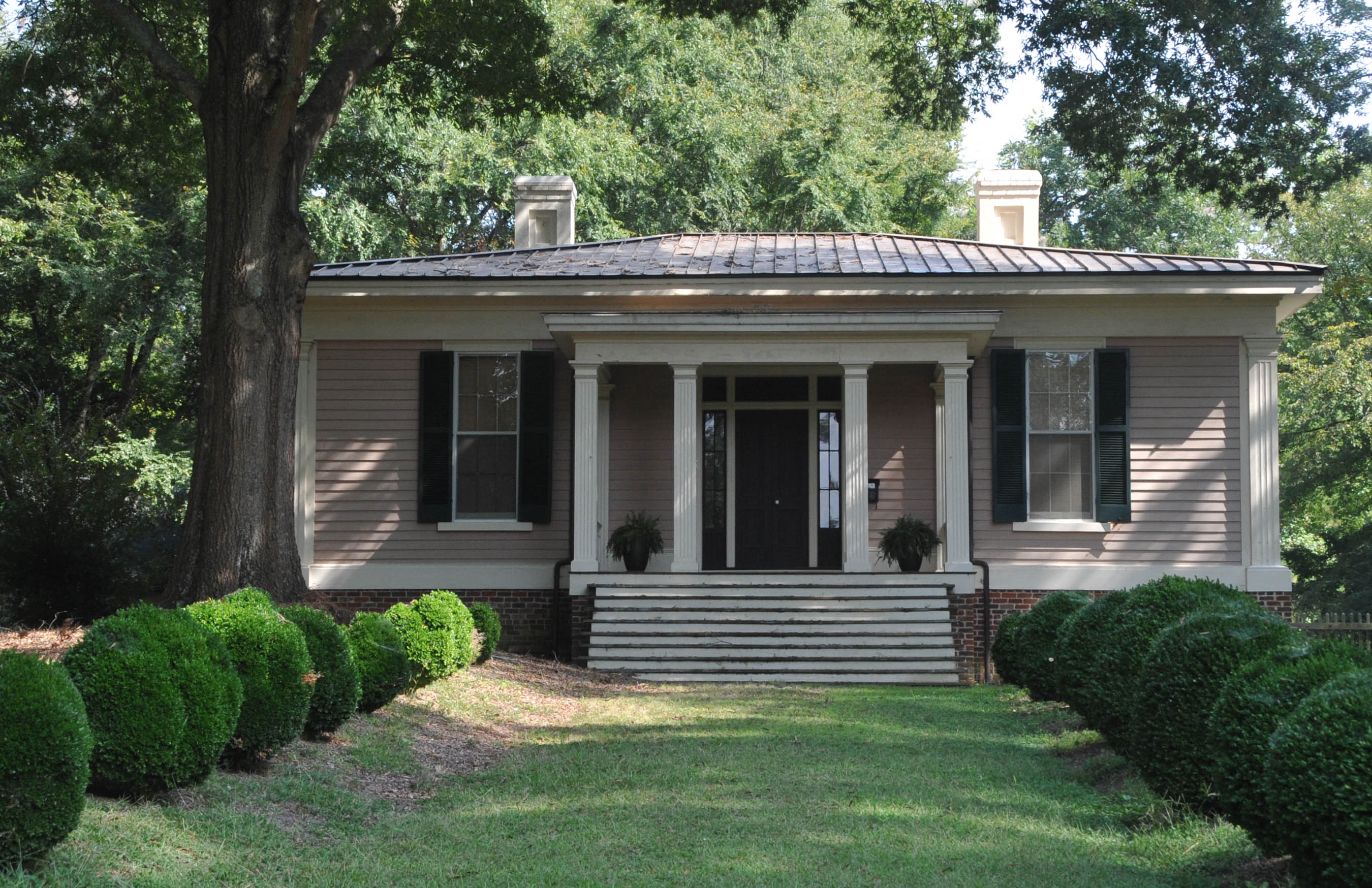
- The historic Williamson House in Louisburg, North Carolina.

- Location within North Carolina Location within the United States
- Location: 401 Cedar St., Louisburg, North Carolina
- Coordinates: 36°6′3″N 78°17′45″W
- Area: 4.5 acres (1.8 ha)
- Built: c. 1855
- Architectural style: Greek Revival
- NRHP reference No.: 75001272
- Added to NRHP: June 20, 1975

Williamson House is a historic home located at Louisburg, Franklin County, North Carolina. It was built about 1855, and is a one-story, three bay by two bay, Greek Revival style frame cottage dwelling. It has a hipped roof and rests on a brick basement.

It was listed on the National Register of Historic Places in 1975. It is located in the Louisburg Historic District.
