= Louisburg College =

Methodist two-year college in Louisburg, North Carolina, US

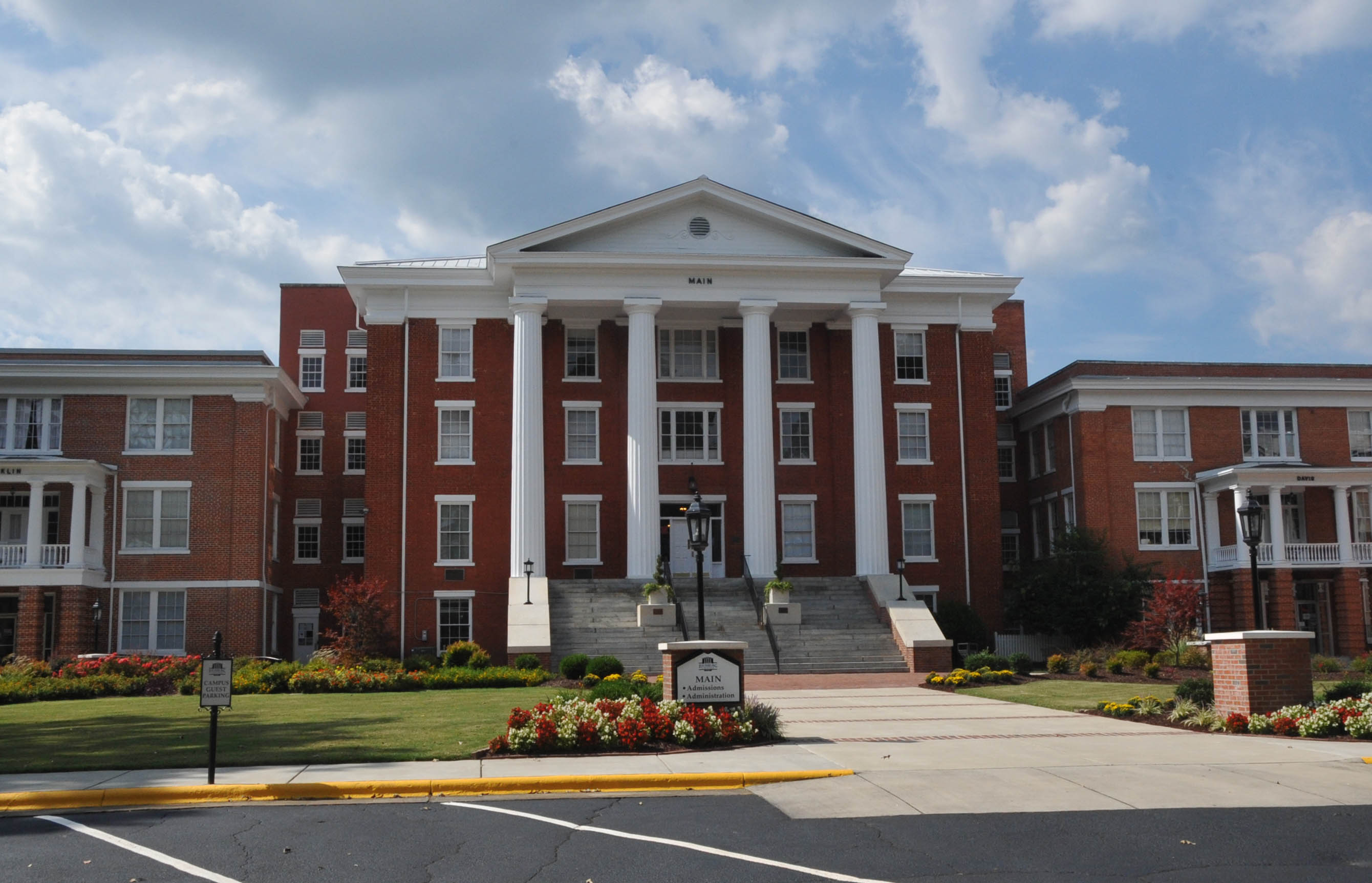
- Motto: Sapientia Gemmis Melior
- Type: Private two-year college
- Established: 1787 (as Franklin Male College); 1814; 212 years ago
- Religious affiliation: Methodist
- President: Gary M. Brown
- Administrative staff: 60
- Undergraduates: 380
- Location: Louisburg, North Carolina, United States
- Campus: Rural Main: 75 acres (30 ha)
- Mascot: Hurricanes
- Website: www.louisburg.edu
- Main Building, Louisburg College
- U.S. National Register of Historic Places
- U.S. Historic district – Contributing property
- Location within North Carolina Location within the United States
- Location: Louisburg College campus, Louisburg, North Carolina
- Coordinates: 36°6′17″N 78°18′0″W
- Area: 6 acres (2.4 ha)
- Built: 1857
- Built by: Jones, Albert Gamaliel
- Architectural style: Greek Revival
- NRHP reference No.: 78001955
- Added to NRHP: December 8, 1978

Louisburg College is a private Methodist-affiliated two-year college in Louisburg, North Carolina.

== History ==
Louisburg College has its roots in two schools: Franklin Male Academy, which was chartered in 1787, re-chartered in 1802 but held its first recorded classes on January 1, 1805; and Louisburg Female College, which was founded in 1857, succeeding a previous institution, Louisburg Female Academy, founded in 1814.

Louisburg Female Academy opened its doors in 1815, under the direction of Harriet Partridge, making it one of the oldest institutions of higher education for women. In 1855, the property of Louisburg Female Academy was transferred to the Louisburg Female College Company; the newly formed body, Louisburg Female College, opened its doors in 1857. Old Main, the central building of the Female Academy, was listed on the National Register of Historic Places in 1978. It is located in the Louisburg Historic District.

== Campus ==
Louisburg College consists of 20 major buildings. It sits on the north side of the city on 75 acres of land with Main Street running through the middle, dividing campus into West Campus and East Campus.

== Academics ==
Students can earn degrees in three different fields including the Associate of Arts in General College, the Associate of Science in General Science, and the Associate of Science in business. Students can take additional coursework in disciplines such as the expressive arts and education.

== Athletics ==
The Louisburg Hurricanes rosters 14 varsity athletic teams; Men's and Women's Basketball, Men's and Women's Soccer, Men's and Women's Cross Country/Track, Baseball, Softball, Women's Volleyball, Football, Esports, and Cheerleading. Louisburg competes in the NJCAA in varying divisions depending on team.

== Notable people ==
- Archibald Hunter Arrington ‘18 – politician, County Commissioner in 1868
- Fanny Yarborough Bickett, First Lady of North Carolina and first female president of the North Carolina Railroad
- Ellis Credle ‘22 – author, Down Down the Mountain
- Joseph J. Davis ’48 – politician and lawyer – US House of Representatives, 1875

=== Sports ===
- Bill Moran '71 – baseball player
- Mike Dement '74 – college basketball coach
- Ron Musselman '75 – baseball player
- Mark Funderburk '76 – baseball player
- Kelly Heath '77 – baseball player
- Brian Holton '78 – baseball player
- Otis Nixon '79 – baseball player
- Greg Briley '85 – baseball player
- Theodore "Blue" Edwards '86 – basketball player
- Russell Scott Riggs '91 – racecar driver
- Chad Fonville '92 – baseball player
- Travis Cherry '96 – musician
- Josh Rupe '02 – baseball player
- Ian Drew Thomas '07 – baseball player
- Paul Clemens '08 – baseball player
- Billy McShepard '09, basketball player
- Forrayah Bass '13 – soccer player
- Cedric Mullins '14, baseball player
- Larrell Murchison '16, football player
- Spencer Bivens – baseball player
- Shavon Revel – football player
- Eric Bullock – baseball player
- Bryan Little – baseball player
