= Royal, Franklin County, North Carolina =

Unincorporated community in North Carolina, US

Coordinates: 36°00′55″N 78°21′29″W

Royal is an unincorporated community on U.S. Route 401, in southeastern Franklin County, North Carolina, United States.

It lies at an elevation of 377 feet (115 m). The primary cross roads where the community is located are U.S. 401, Flat Rock Church Road (SR 1103) and Clifton Pond Road (SR 1103).

Clifton House and Mill Site was listed on the National Register of Historic Places in 1980.
