= Massenburg Plantation =

Historic house in North Carolina, United States

- U.S. National Register of Historic Places
- Location within North Carolina Location within the United States
- Location: Address Restricted; also 821 NC 561, near Louisburg, North Carolina
- Coordinates: 36°7′6″N 78°16′8″W
- Area: 24 acres (9.7 ha)
- Built: c. 1820, 1838, c. 1910
- Built by: Jones, William
- Architectural style: L-shaped, Bungalow/craftsman
- NRHP reference No.: 75001270, 00000225 (Boundary Increase)
- Added to NRHP: July 30, 1975, March 15, 2000 (Boundary Increase)

Massenburg Plantation, also known as Woodleaf Plantation, is a historic plantation house located near Louisburg, Franklin County, North Carolina. The property encompasses 10 contributing buildings, 1 contributing site, and 1 contributing structure. The main house reached its present form in 1838, and is a simple two-story L-shaped dwelling, with a rear two-story wing. It is four bays wide and features a stone block chimney. The property is currently owned by Bill Lord and Sue Guerrant. The property also includes the contributing plantation office, smokehouse, cotton gin, storage building, hen house, 1 1/2-story Perry House bungalow (c. 1910), and Overseer's House ruins (c. 1832).

It was listed on the National Register of Historic Places in 1975, with a boundary increase in 2000. The property is currently owned by a descendant of the slaves.
