= Clifton House and Mill Site =

Historic house in North Carolina, United States

- U.S. National Register of Historic Places
- Location within North Carolina Location within the United States
- Location: SR 1103, near Royal, North Carolina
- Coordinates: 36°00′05″N 78°21′00″W
- Area: 245 acres (99 ha)
- Built: c. 1831, c. 1850
- Architectural style: Greek Revival, Italianate
- NRHP reference No.: 80002835
- Added to NRHP: April 17, 1980

Clifton House and Mill Site is a historic home and grist mill site located near Royal, Franklin County, North Carolina. It was built in the 1850s, and is a two-story, rectangular frame house with a hipped roof in the Greek Revival style with Italianate design elements. It features a two-story pedimented front porch and has a two-story rear ell. Also on the property are two contributing 19th-century outbuildings, Miller's House, and the ruins of a grist mill built about 1831, including some machinery.

It was listed on the National Register of Historic Places in 1980.
