= Vine Hill (Centerville, North Carolina) =

Historic house in North Carolina, United States

- U.S. National Register of Historic Places
- Nearest city: Centerville, North Carolina
- Area: 20 acres (8.1 ha)
- Built: 1856-1858
- Built by: Holt, Jacob
- Architectural style: Greek Revival, Italianate
- NRHP reference No.: 75001259
- Added to NRHP: May 28, 1975

Vine Hill is a historic plantation house located near Centerville, Franklin County, North Carolina. It was built / remodeled about 1856–1858, and is a two-story, three-bay, four-square Italianate / Greek Revival style frame dwelling. It is sheathed in weatherboard and has a hipped roof. It was built / remodeled by noted American carpenter and builder Jacob W. Holt (1811–1880).

It was listed on the National Register of Historic Places in 1975.
