= Portridge =

Historic house in North Carolina, United States

- U.S. National Register of Historic Places
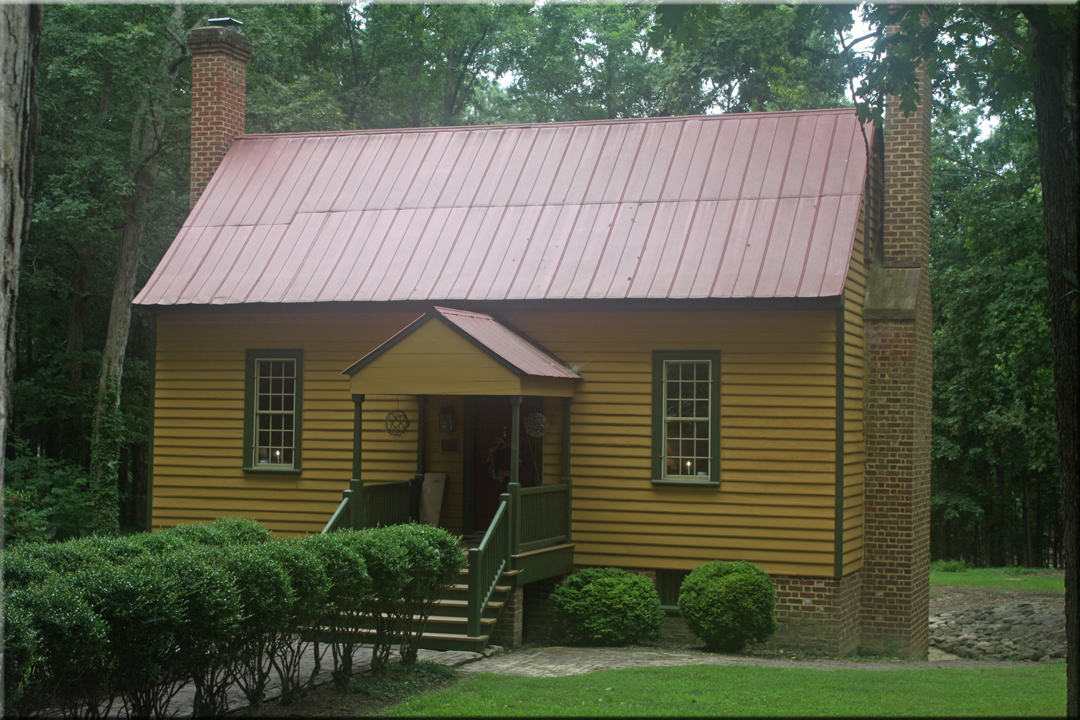
- Portridge located near Louisburg, North Carolina

- Location within North Carolina Location within the United States
- Location: SR 1224, 0.3 miles N of jct. with NC 56, near Louisburg, North Carolina
- Coordinates: 36°5′29″N 78°21′2″W
- Area: 3.1 acres (1.3 ha)
- Built: 1780
- Architectural style: Georgian
- NRHP reference No.: 90000351
- Added to NRHP: March 1, 1990

Portridge is a historic plantation house located near Louisburg, Franklin County, North Carolina at 225 May Road. While a number of sources say the home was built around 1780, it was actually constructed in circa 1764 according to its current owners. Portridge is a 1 1/2-story, three-bay, single pile Georgian style frame dwelling. It has a gable roof, three brick chimneys, and a one-room rear ell. Portridge was moved to its present location in 1984, and subsequently restored.

Portridge was listed on the National Register of Historic Places in 1990. The Garden at Portridge currently hosts special horticulture events, has a botanical garden surrounding the home and sells plants on site. It is open to visitors daily.
