= Franklin County Training School-Riverside Union School =

Historic school building in North Carolina, United States

- U.S. National Register of Historic Places
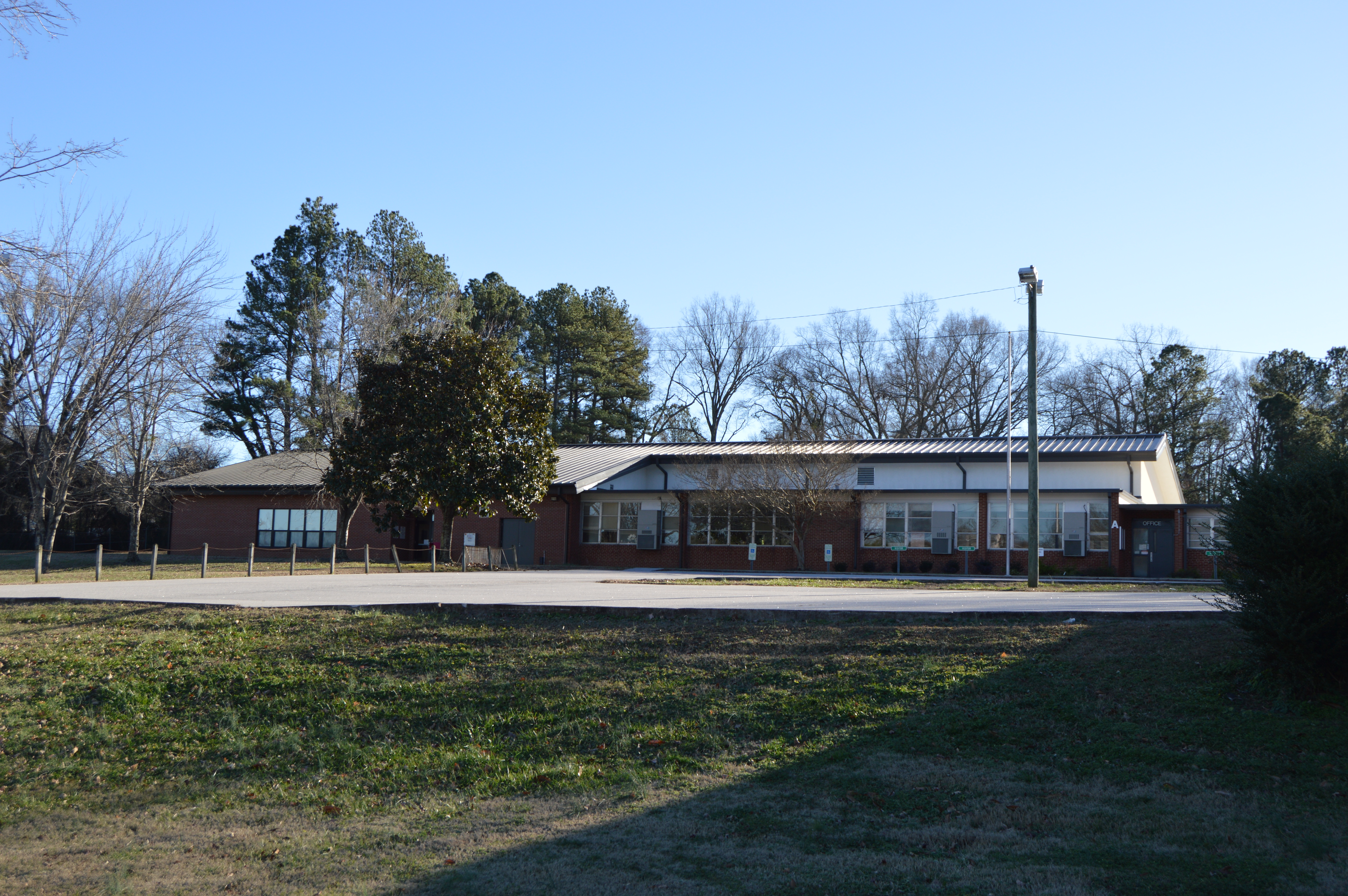
- Front of the school

- Location within North Carolina Location within the United States
- Location: 53 W. River Rd., Louisburg, North Carolina
- Coordinates: 36°5′40″N 78°18′21″W
- Area: 7.2 acres (2.9 ha)
- Built: 1951, 1960, 1964
- Architectural style: Modern Movement
- NRHP reference No.: 11001011
- Added to NRHP: January 3, 2011

Franklin County Training School-Riverside Union School, formerly known as Louisburg Elementary School, is a historic school complex located at Louisburg, Franklin County, North Carolina. The complex includes three contributing Modern Movement style buildings: 1951 Classroom Building originally built for the Franklin County Training School; a 1960 Classroom Building (with a small 1985 addition; built for Riverside Union School); and a 1964 Cafeteria Building. The complex was built to serve the educational needs of the African-American population of Franklin County. The school became the Riverside Union School in 1960, and remained so until 1968, when it became Louisburg Elementary School. In 2006, it became the central district office for Franklin County Schools. The Boys & Girls Clubs of Central North Carolina, Franklin County Unit, is also located on the campus.

It was listed on the National Register of Historic Places in 2012.

A more complete history of the school from the late 1800s to 2005 is available at https://repository.lib.ncsu.edu/handle/1840.16/4586. It is a dissertation written by John H. Cubbage in completion of his doctorate degree in Educational Administration and Supervision (with a concentration in Public Administration) at North Carolina State University in 2005.
