= Dr. Samuel Perry House =

Historic house in North Carolina, United States

- U.S. National Register of Historic Places
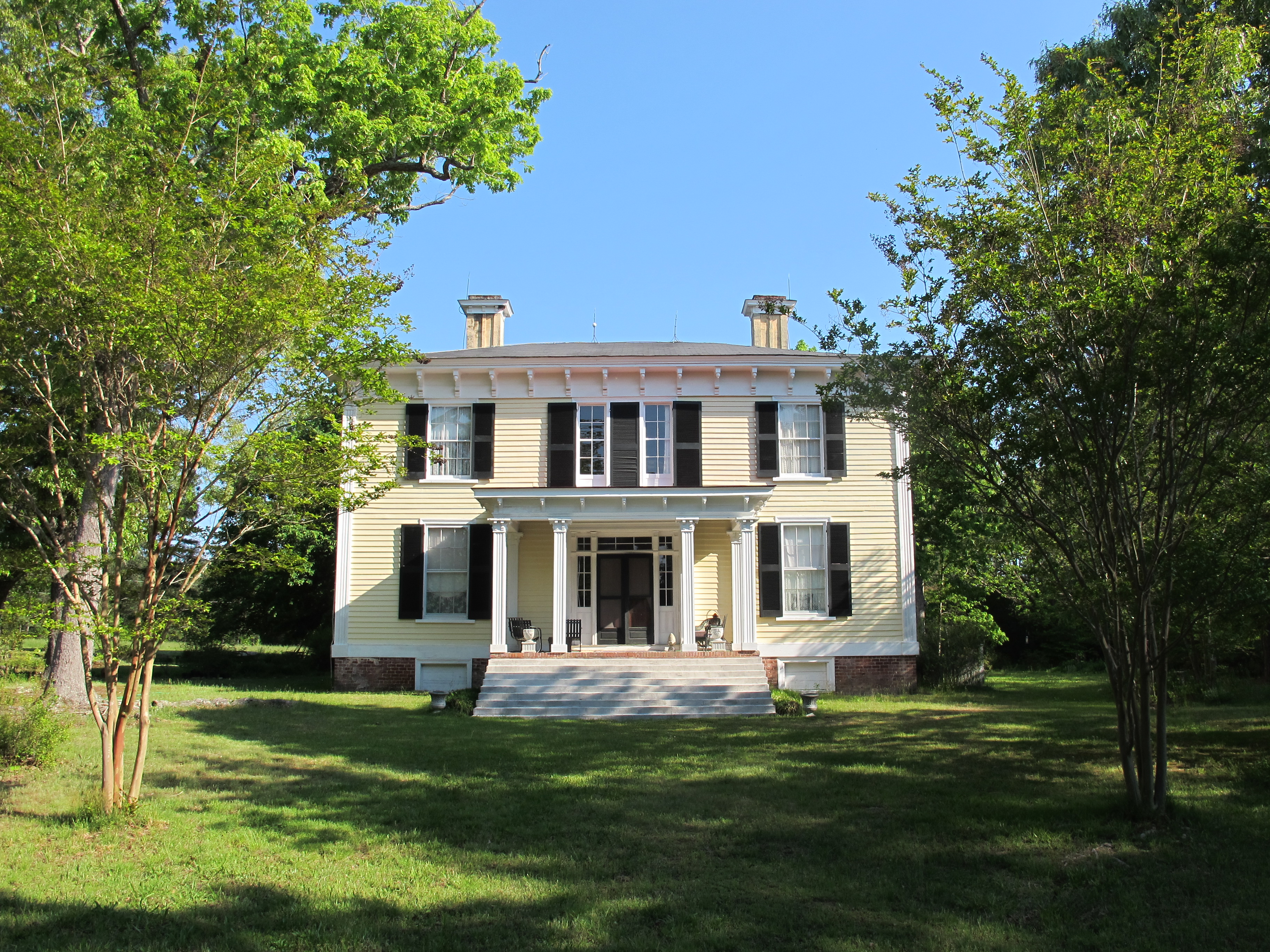

- Location within North Carolina Location within the United States
- Location: East of Gupton on SR 1436, near Gupton, North Carolina
- Coordinates: 36°11′52″N 78°9′6″W
- Area: 9 acres (3.6 ha)
- Built: 1857
- Built by: Jacob Holt
- Architectural style: Greek Revival, Italianate
- NRHP reference No.: 75001263
- Added to NRHP: June 5, 1975

Dr. Samuel Perry House is a historic plantation house located near Gupton, Franklin County, North Carolina. It was built about 1857, and is a two-story, three-bay, four-square Italianate / Greek Revival style frame dwelling. It is sheathed in weatherboard and has a hipped roof. It was built by noted American carpenter and builder Jacob W. Holt (1811-1880).

It was listed on the National Register of Historic Places in 1975.
