= Thomas and Lois Wheless House =

Historic house in North Carolina, United States

- U.S. National Register of Historic Places
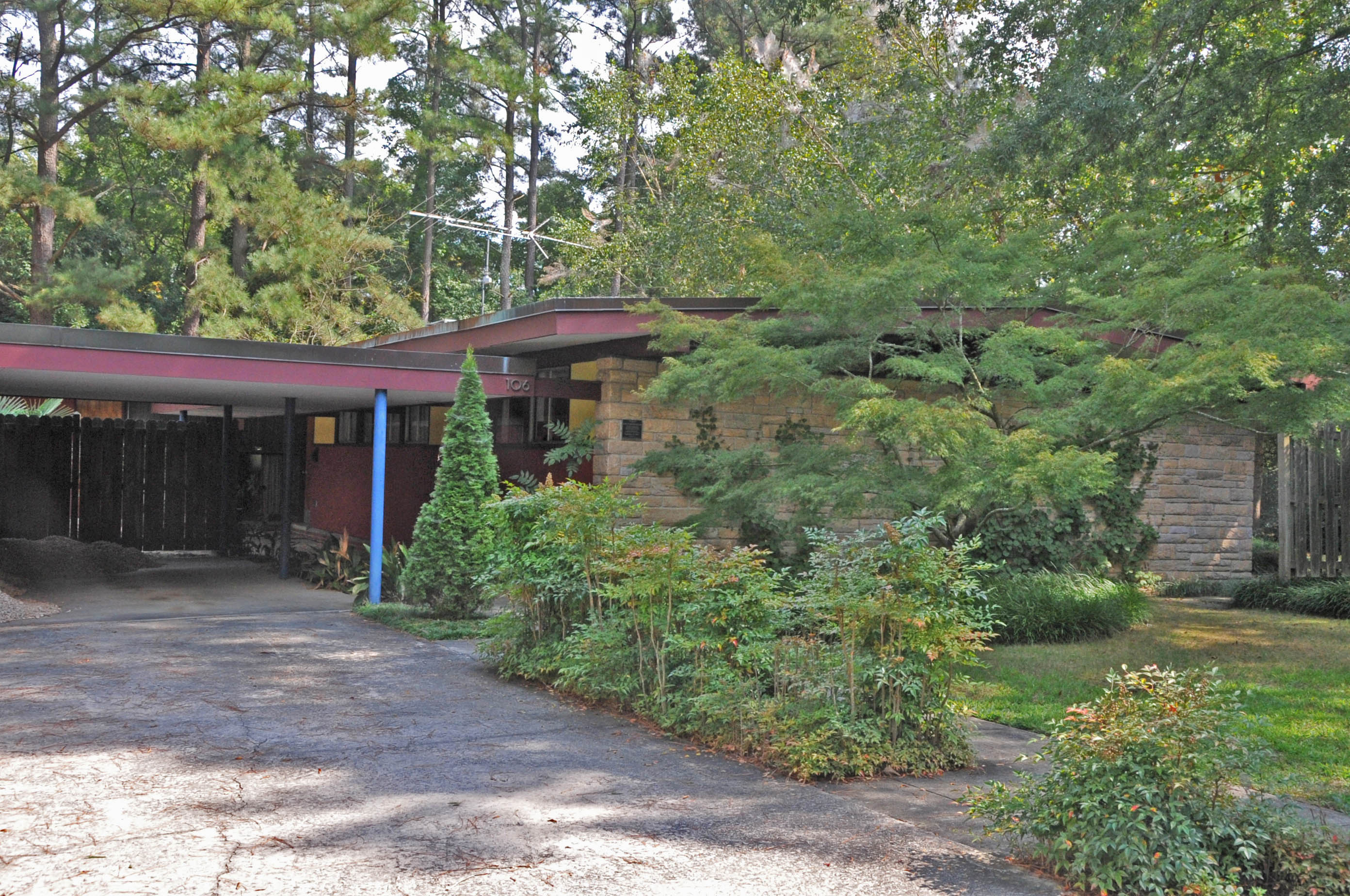
- Thomas and Lois Wheless House, March 2007

- Location within North Carolina Location within the United States
- Location: 106 John St., Louisburg, North Carolina
- Coordinates: 36°6′1″N 78°17′44″W
- Area: less than one acre
- Built: 1954-1955
- Architectural style: Modern Movement
- NRHP reference No.: 07000887
- Added to NRHP: August 28, 2007

Thomas and Lois Wheless House is a historic home located at Louisburg, Franklin County, North Carolina. It was built in 1954–1955, and is a one-story, rectangular Modern Movement style dwelling of glass, wood, and stone. It has a low-pitched gable roof, rests on a concrete-slab foundation, and measures 30 feet wide and 72 feet deep.

It was listed on the National Register of Historic Places in 2007.
