= Monreath =

Historic house in North Carolina, United States

- U.S. National Register of Historic Places
- Location within North Carolina Location within the United States
- Location: S of Ingleside on NC 39, near Ingleside, North Carolina
- Coordinates: 36°09′56″N 78°17′40″W
- Area: 5 acres (2.0 ha)
- Built: c. 1790
- Architectural style: Georgian
- NRHP reference No.: 75001264
- Added to NRHP: August 6, 1975

Monreath is a historic plantation house located near Ingleside, Franklin County, North Carolina, USA. It was built about 1790 and is a two-story, L-shaped, Georgian style frame dwelling with a hipped roof and two-story rear ell. It is sheathed in weatherboard and has exterior end chimneys.

It was listed on the National Register of Historic Places in 1975.
