= Jones–Wright House =

Historic house in North Carolina, United States

- U.S. National Register of Historic Places
- Location within North Carolina Location within the United States
- Location: NC 1003 W side, 0.2 miles S of jct. with NC 1252, near Rocky Ford, North Carolina
- Coordinates: 36°12′44″N 78°20′54″W
- Area: 5 acres (2.0 ha)
- Built: c. 1790
- Architectural style: Georgian
- NRHP reference No.: 92000149
- Added to NRHP: March 12, 1992

Jones–Wright House, also known as the Polly Wright House, is a historic plantation house located near Rocky Ford, Franklin County, North Carolina. It was built about 1790, and is a two-story, three-bay, single pile Late Georgian style heavy timber frame dwelling. It has a low gable roof and brick end chimneys.

It was listed on the National Register of Historic Places in 1992.
