= Perry School =

Historic school building in North Carolina, United States

- U.S. National Register of Historic Places
- Location within North Carolina Location within the United States
- Location: 2266 Laurel Mill-Centerville Rd., near Centerville, North Carolina
- Coordinates: 36°11′35″N 78°07′28″W
- Area: 14.7 acres (5.9 ha)
- Built: 1941, 1949, 1952, 1963
- Architect: Holloway-Reeves
- Architectural style: Colonial Revival
- NRHP reference No.: 10001110
- Added to NRHP: January 3, 2011

Perry School is a historic school complex located near Centerville, Franklin County, North Carolina. The complex consists of four buildings: a one-story Colonial Revival style frame school (1941); a one-story, gable-roofed detached concrete block rear wing (1949); a low-slung, U-shaped, one-story, brick high school (1952); and the roughly rectangular, gable-roofed brick gymtorium (1963). The complex also includes the baseball field and two sets of paired brick pillars erected by two graduating classes. The complex was built to serve the educational needs of the African-American population of Franklin County and is one of a few remaining Jim Crow-era schools in the county. The original school was built with funds provided by the Public Works Administration (PWA). The Perry School closed in 1968 as a result of integration.

It was listed on the National Register of Historic Places in 2011.
