= Patty Person Taylor House =

Historic house in North Carolina, United States

- U.S. National Register of Historic Places
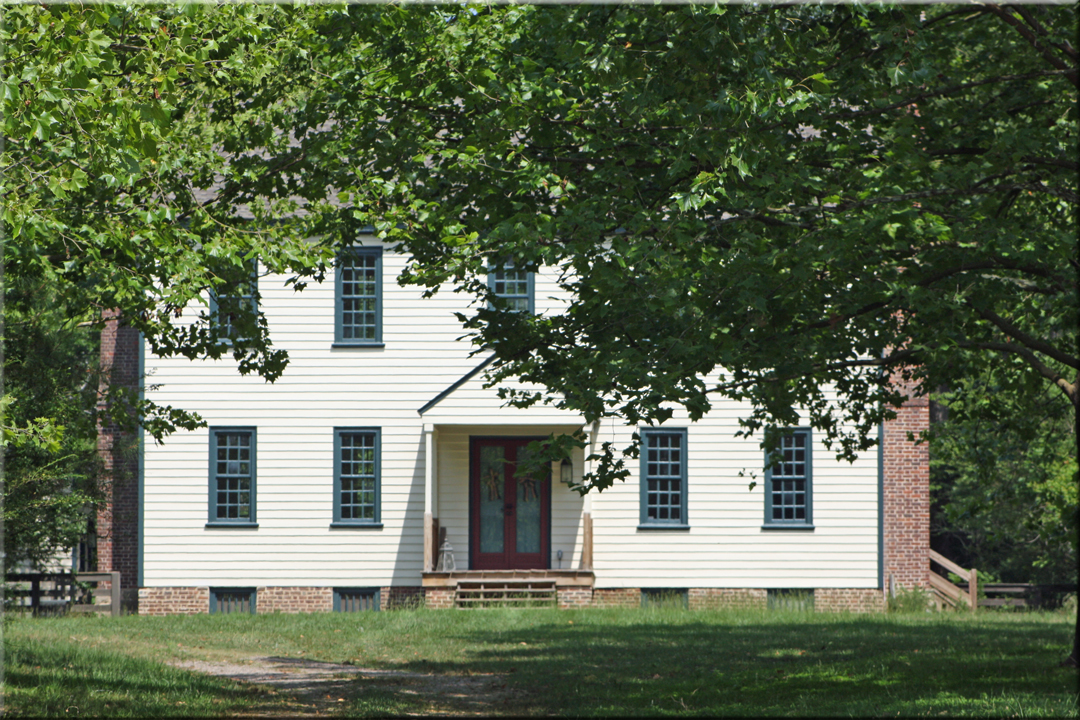
- A view of the Patty Person Taylor House through the trees.
- Nearest city: Louisburg, North Carolina
- Area: 9 acres (3.6 ha)
- Built: c. 1783
- Architectural style: Georgian
- NRHP reference No.: 75001271
- Added to NRHP: February 13, 1975

Patty Person Taylor House is a historic home located near Louisburg, Franklin County, North Carolina. It was built about 1783, and is a two-story, five-bay, Georgian style frame dwelling. It has a gable roof and one-story rear extension. It has a center-hall plan one room deep, with notable Georgian woodwork. It was the home of the sister of Thomas Person (1733–1800), who died at the house in 1800.

It was listed on the National Register of Historic Places in 1975.
