= Wood, North Carolina =

Human settlement in Franklin County, North Carolina, United States

Coordinates: 36°11′04″N 78°03′26″W

Wood (formerly, Wood's Store) is a small unincorporated community in northeastern Franklin County, North Carolina, United States, on North Carolina Highway 561 east of Centerville. Settled in 1893, Wood was incorporated as a town in 1917. The town charter was repealed on May 5, 1961. Wood lies at an elevation of 322 feet (98 m).

Archibald Taylor House was listed on the National Register of Historic Places in 1975.
