= Centerville, North Carolina =

- Census-designated place
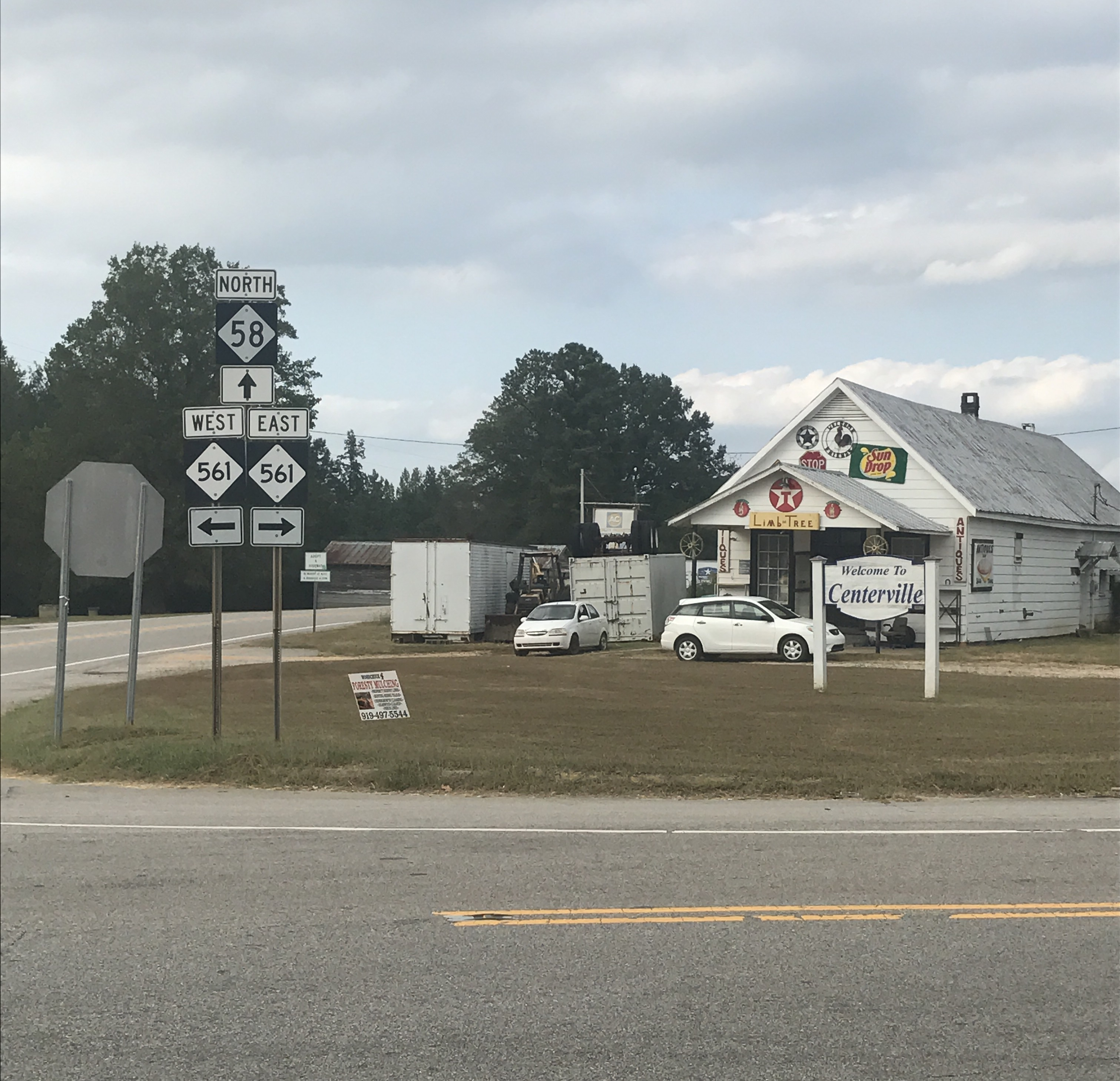

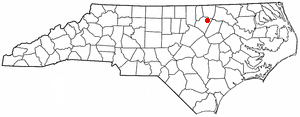
- Location of Centerville, North Carolina
- Coordinates: 36°11′12″N 78°06′41″W
- Country: United States
- State: North Carolina
- County: Franklin
- Established: 1882
- Incorporated: May 25, 1965
- Dissolved: July 22, 2017
- Named for: Central location of area between Louisburg, Warrenton and Littleton.

Area
  - Total: 1.65 sq mi (4.28 km^{2})
  - Land: 1.63 sq mi (4.22 km^{2})
  - Water: 0.023 sq mi (0.06 km^{2})
- Elevation: 322 ft (98 m)

Population (2020)
  - Total: 149
  - Density: 91.5/sq mi (35.34/km^{2})
- Time zone: UTC-5 (Eastern (EST))
  - Summer (DST): UTC-4 (EDT)
- Area codes: 919 and 984
- FIPS code: 37-11560
- GNIS feature ID: 2791522

Centerville is a census-designated place (CDP) in the rural northeastern corner of Franklin County, North Carolina, United States. The population was 149 at the 2020 census. It was an incorporated town from 1965 to 2017.

There is not a post office in Centerville, and thus no zip code; it simply uses that of Louisburg, which is located 12 miles (19 km) west. Centerville is centered on "the crossroads", which is the intersection of NC-561 and NC-58 and the site of two small old-fashioned general stores.

Centerville has a church, (Centerville Baptist Church, a member of the Southern Baptist Convention), and volunteer fire department. There is not a police department, so Centerville, like the surrounding unincorporated area, is patrolled by the Franklin County Sheriff's Office.

Centerville includes many antique buildings from its heyday, including the now-defunct Sarepta Church, a former Methodist church located at the intersection of NC-561 and Centerville-Laurel Mill Road.

Perry School and Vine Hill are listed on the National Register of Historic Places.

== History ==
Centerville was established circa 1882 and named for its central location between the towns of Louisburg, Warrenton and Littleton. It was incorporated in 1965, four years after the dissolution of the nearby town of Wood.

== Geography ==
According to the United States Census Bureau, the city has a total area of 0.3 square miles (0.78 km^{2}), all land.

== Demographics ==
Historical population
Census	Pop.	Note	%±
1970	123		—
1980	135		9.8%
1990	115		−14.8%
2000	99		−13.9%
2010	89		−10.1%
2020	149		67.4%
U.S. Decennial Census

=== 2020 census ===
Centerville racial composition
Race	Number	Percentage
White (non-Hispanic)	116	77.85%
Black or African American (non-Hispanic)	3	2.01%
Native American	1	0.67%
Asian	0	0%
Other/Mixed	15	10.07%
Hispanic or Latino	14	9.4%

As of the 2020 United States census, there were 149 people, 103 households, and 85 families residing in the CDP.

=== 2010 census ===
As of the census of 2010, there were 89 people residing in what was then a town. The racial makeup of the town was 93% White (83 persons), 3.5% Black (3 persons), and 3.5% other (3 persons).

== Dissolution ==
On February 22, 2017, a bill was filed in the North Carolina General Assembly seeking legislative approval for dissolution of the Town of Centerville. The Centerville Town Council voted unanimously in their January meeting to dissolve the town charter due to Centerville's lack of growth and its financial inability to continue as a municipality. When the bill is passed, the town will have 30 days to pay off its bills and liquidate its assets. Under the legislation, any remaining money would be given to Centerville Fire Department. Senate Bill 122, regarding the dissolution of the Town of Centerville, was ratified by the North Carolina General Assembly on June 22, 2017. The town officially dissolved on July 22, 2017.
