= Person Place =

Historic house in North Carolina, United States

- U.S. National Register of Historic Places
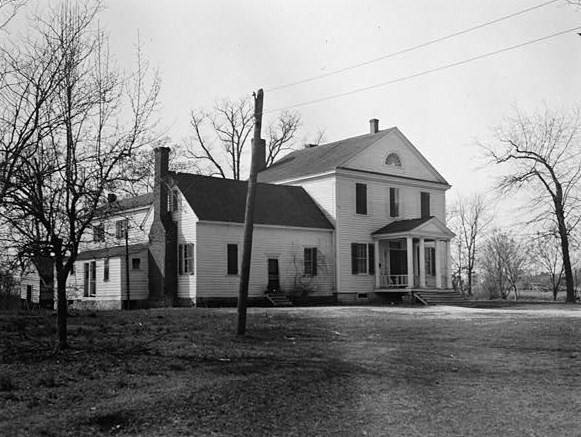
- Prudence Person House, HABS Photo

- Location within North Carolina Location within the United States
- Location: 603 N. Main St., Louisburg, North Carolina
- Coordinates: 36°6′22″N 78°17′46″W
- Area: 0.8 acres (0.32 ha)
- Built: 1789
- Built by: Milner, Wilson; Williams, William P.
- Architectural style: Georgian, Federal
- NRHP reference No.: 72000962
- Added to NRHP: June 19, 1972

Person Place, also known as Prudence Person House, is a historic home located at Louisburg, Franklin County, North Carolina. It consists of a large two-story, three-bay, Federal style main block built about 1789, with a 1 1/2-story, three-bay Georgian wing. The front facade features a small three bay pedimented porch supported by four wooden Doric order columns. It also has two brick chimneys with concave shoulders.

It was listed on the National Register of Historic Places in 1972.
