= Dean Farm (Louisburg, North Carolina) =

Historic farm in North Carolina, United States

- U.S. National Register of Historic Places
- U.S. Historic district
- Location within North Carolina Location within the United States
- Location: 6 miles E of Louisburg on NC 56, near Louisburg, North Carolina
- Coordinates: 36°5′21″N 78°10′46″W
- Area: 20 acres (8.1 ha)
- Built: c. 1842
- Architectural style: Greek Revival, Federal
- NRHP reference No.: 75001267
- Added to NRHP: May 2, 1975

Dean Farm is a historic farm complex and national historic district located near Louisburg, Franklin County, North Carolina. The district encompasses two contributing buildings, one contributing site, and two contributing structures. The farmhouse was built about 1842, and is a two-story, three-bay, Federal / Greek Revival style frame dwelling. It has a gable roof and two large single-shoulder gable-end chimneys of large stone blocks. Also on the property are the contributing smokehouse, corn crib, harness room, and family cemetery.

It was listed on the National Register of Historic Places in 1975.
