= Laurel Mill and Col. Jordan Jones House =

Historic buildings in North Carolina, United States

- U.S. National Register of Historic Places
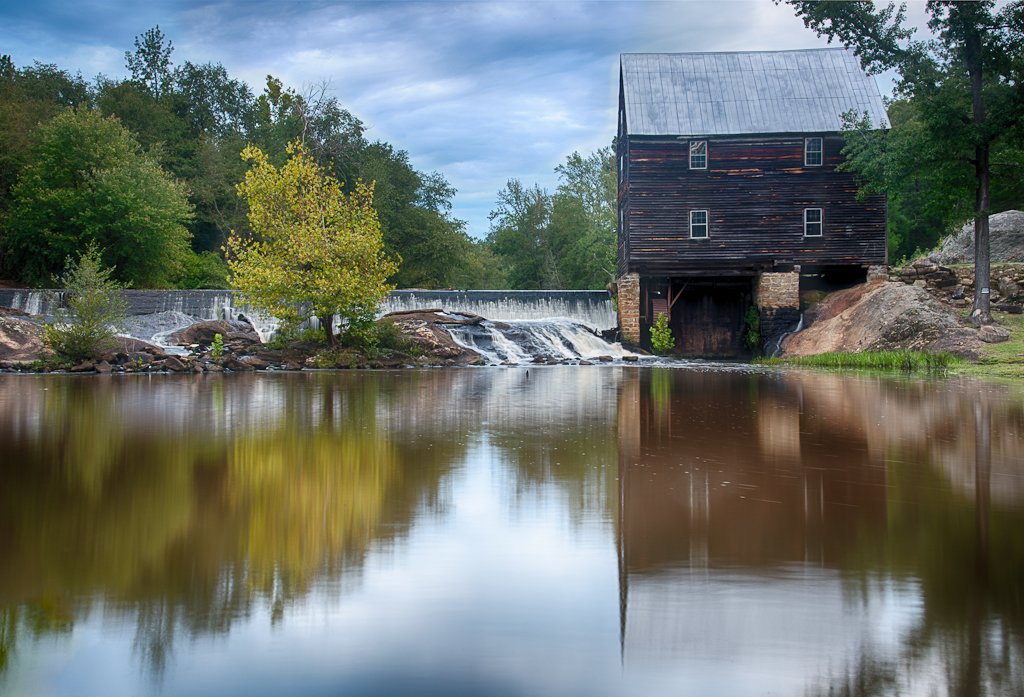
- Laurel Mill, September 2012

- Location within North Carolina Location within the United States
- Location: SW of Gupton at jct. of SR 1432 and 1436, near Gupton, North Carolina
- Coordinates: 36°10′40″N 78°11′30″W
- Area: 40 acres (16 ha)
- Built: c. 1850
- Architectural style: Greek Revival, Italianate
- NRHP reference No.: 75001262
- Added to NRHP: May 30, 1975

Laurel Mill and Col. Jordan Jones House is a historic home and grist mill located near Gupton, Franklin County, North Carolina. The house was built about 1850, and is a one-story Greek Revival / Italianate style frame cottage over a raised brick basement. The frame mill building is two stories tall supported by large stone piers. The mill building extends over Sandy Creek. The house and mill are all that remains of the ambitious local industrial complex.

It was listed on the National Register of Historic Places in 1975.
