= Ingleside, North Carolina =

Unincorporated community in North Carolina, US

Coordinates: 36°10′35″N 78°17′46″W

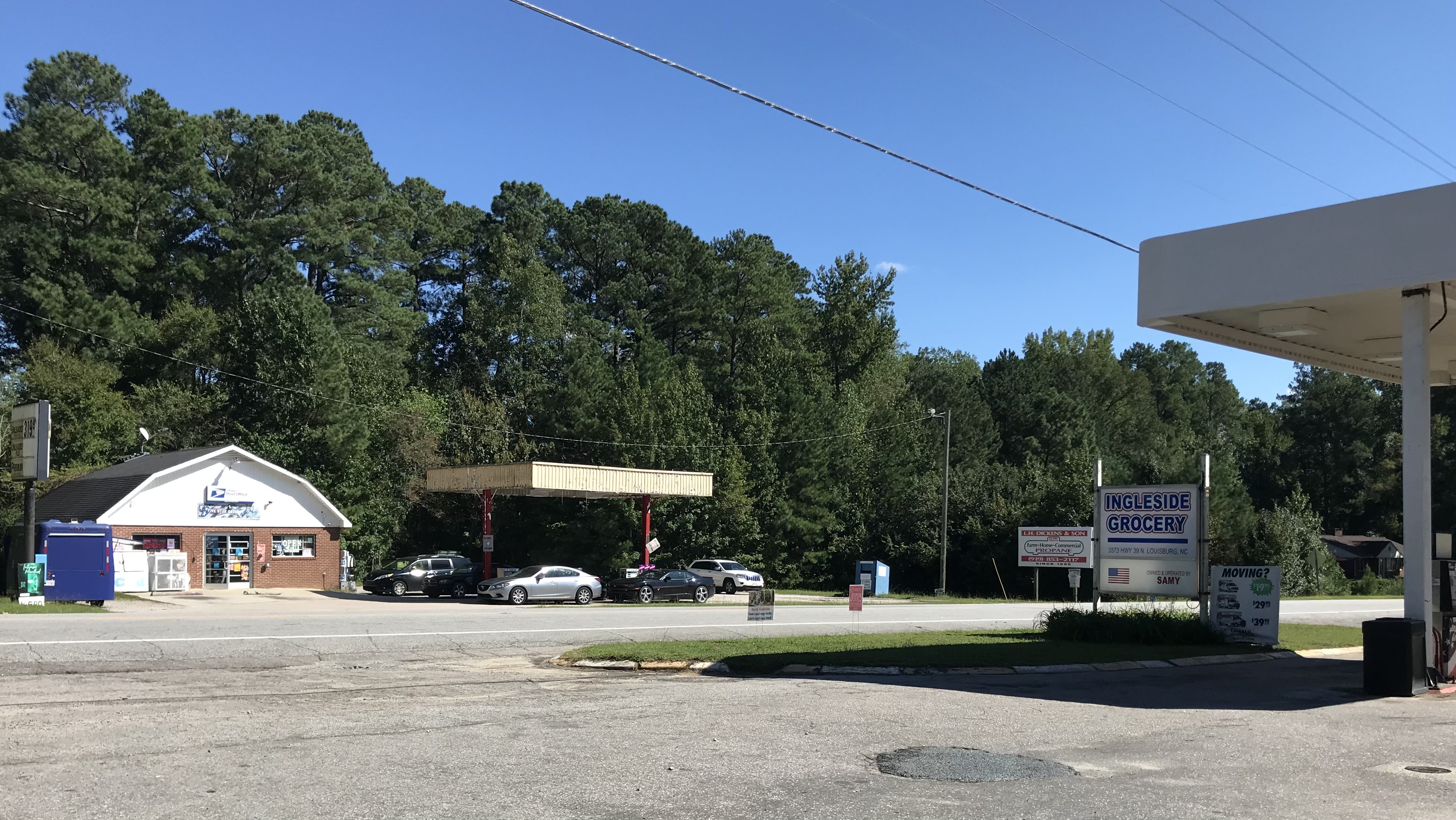
Stores in Ingleside, 2022

Ingleside is an unincorporated community in northern Franklin County, North Carolina, United States. It lies at the intersection of U.S. Route 401, and North Carolina Highway 39, north of Louisburg, at an elevation of 394 feet (120 m).

The Locust Grove and Monreath are listed on the National Register of Historic Places.
