= Cascine (Louisburg, North Carolina) =

Historic farm in North Carolina, United States

- U.S. National Register of Historic Places
- U.S. Historic district
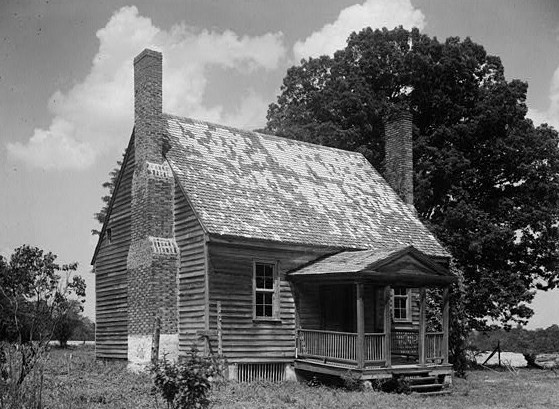
- Cascine early house, HABS Photo, June 1940

- Location within North Carolina Location within the United States
- Location: S of Louisburg on SR 1702; also the northern side of NC 1702, near Louisburg, North Carolina
- Coordinates: 36°2′21″N 78°19′25″W
- Area: 1,287 acres (521 ha)
- Built: c. 1752, c. 1850
- Built by: Jeremiah and Dr. A.S. Perry
- Architectural style: Greek Revival, Gothic Revival
- NRHP reference No.: 73001342, 85003114 (Boundary Increase)
- Added to NRHP: April 26, 1973, December 4, 1985 (Boundary Increase)

Cascine is a historic plantation complex and national historic district located near Louisburg, Franklin County, North Carolina. The district encompasses 12 contributing buildings, 4 contributing sites, and 3 contributing structures. The main house was built about 1850, and is a large two-story, Greek Revival style frame dwelling, in the manner of Jacob W. Holt, with Gothic Revival style influences. Also on the property is a small, one-story frame dwelling dated to about 1752. It was repaired and refurbished in the mid-20th century. Also on the property are the contributing brick kitchen, frame stable, granary, carriage house, family cemetery, slave cemetery, remains of slave quarters, tenant house, six log and frame tobacco barns, grist mill complex, and archaeological sites.

It was listed on the National Register of Historic Places in 1972, with a boundary increase in 1985.
