= Speed Farm =

Historic farm in North Carolina, United States

- U.S. National Register of Historic Places
- U.S. Historic district
- Location within North Carolina Location within the United States
- Location: W side NC 1436 between NC 1432 and NC 1434, near Gupton, North Carolina
- Coordinates: 36°11′17″N 78°11′26″W
- Area: 596 acres (241 ha)
- Built: c. 1847
- Architectural style: I-house
- NRHP reference No.: 91001907
- Added to NRHP: December 27, 1991

Speed Farm is a historic farm complex and national historic district located near Gupton, Franklin County, North Carolina. The district encompasses 14 contributing buildings, 2 contributing sites, and 5 contributing structures. The farmhouse was built about 1847 and remodelled to its current configuration in 1900. It is a two-story, three-bay, I-house style frame dwelling. It has a gable roof and an almost full-width front porch. Also on the property are the contributing milk house (c. 1847), smokehouse (c. 1847), kitchen (c. 1847), family cemetery, and an agricultural complex with a granary, ram tower (c. 1935), barn (c. 1840, 1850), corn cribs, hog shed, tobacco grading building (c. 1930), five tobacco barns (c. 1940), and a tenant house (c. 1935).

It was listed on the National Register of Historic Places in 1991.
