= Louisburg, North Carolina =

- Town
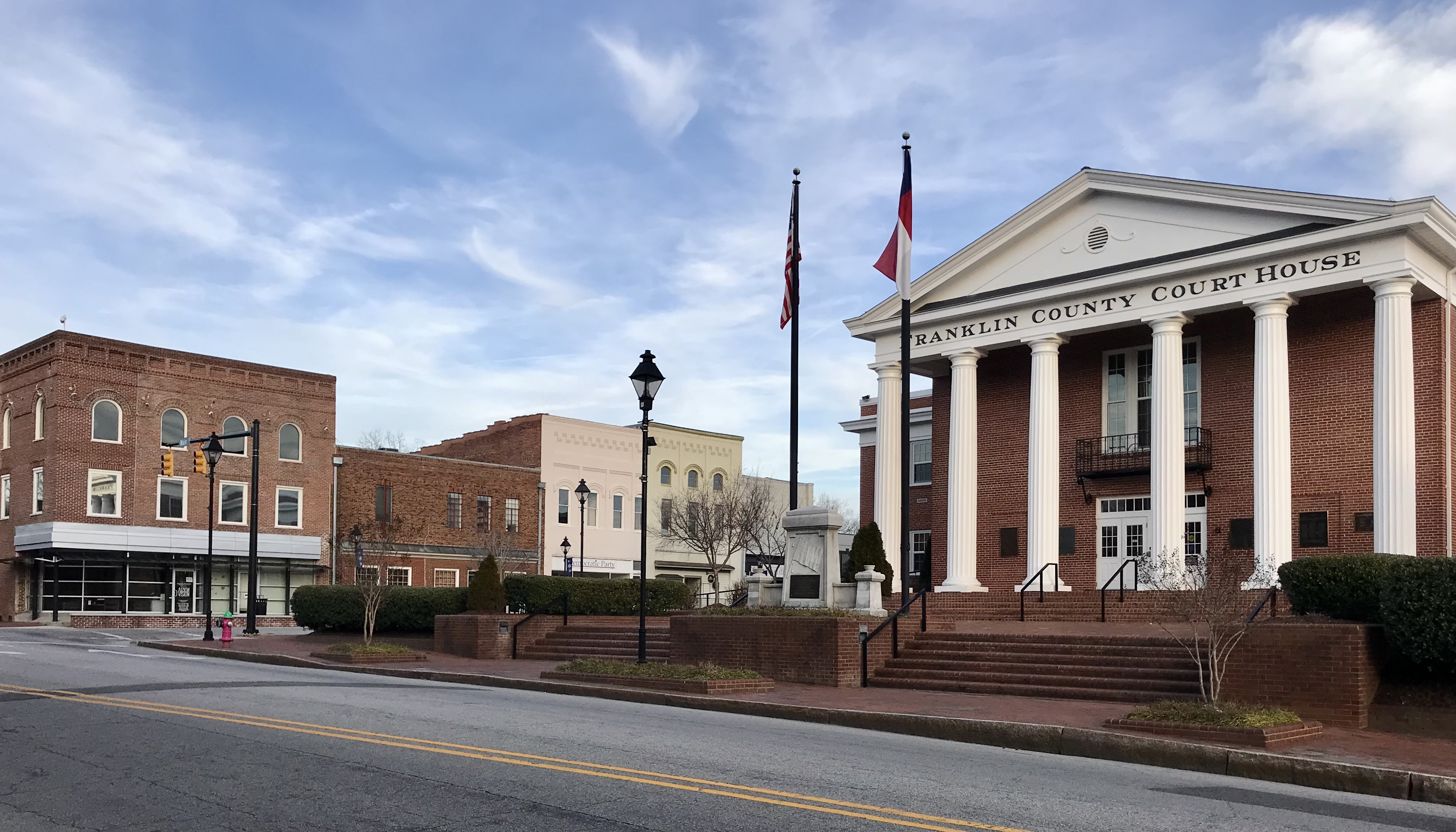
- Franklin County Courthouse on South Main Street

- Seal
- Motto(s): "A charming place to live, learn, work, and play."
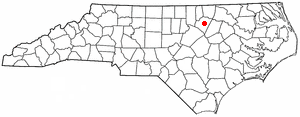
- Location of Louisburg, North Carolina
- Coordinates: 36°05′52″N 78°18′03″W
- Country: United States
- State: North Carolina
- County: Franklin
- Established: 1779
- Named for: King Louis XVI of France

Government
  - Type: Town Council
  - Mayor: Christopher L. Neal (D)

Area
  - Total: 2.96 sq mi (7.67 km^{2})
  - Land: 2.96 sq mi (7.66 km^{2})
  - Water: 0.0039 sq mi (0.01 km^{2})
- Elevation: 220 ft (67 m)

Population (2020)
  - Total: 3,064
  - Density: 1,036.0/sq mi (400.01/km^{2})
- Time zone: UTC-5 (Eastern (EST))
  - Summer (DST): UTC-4 (EDT)
- ZIP code: 27549
- Area codes: 919 and 984
- FIPS code: 37-39360
- GNIS feature ID: 2406047
- Website: townoflouisburg.org

Louisburg is a town in and the county seat of Franklin County, North Carolina, United States. As of the 2020 census, the town population was 3,064. The town is located approximately 29 miles northeast of the state capital, Raleigh, and located about 31 miles south of the Virginia border. It is also the home of Louisburg College, the oldest two-year coeducational college in the United States.

== History ==
Louisburg was established in 1779 and named in honor of King Louis XVI of France, who was aiding the American Revolution at the time. Louisburg was established on land purchased for the erection of a courthouse.

In June 1965, the local newspaper and radio station publicized the names and addresses of African-American families who had applied to attend white schools in Franklin County. The families were attacked on numerous occasions by white extremists, who fired into their homes or destroyed their cars. In the summer of 1966, a series of cross burnings were perpetrated by the Ku Klux Klan in Franklin County, including one in front of the County Board of Education in Louisburg.

== Geography ==
According to the United States Census Bureau, the town has a total area of 2.8 square miles (7.3 km^{2}), all land.

=== Climate ===
Like the rest of eastern North Carolina, Louisburg has a humid subtropical climate (Köppen climate classification Cfa), with cool to mild winters and hot, humid summers. Rainfall - which is mainly produced by afternoon thunderstorms - is highest in the summer months. Snowfall is light and infrequent, with an average of 1.7 inches (4.32 cm) per year.

Climate data for Louisburg, North Carolina (1991-2020 normals, extremes 1893–present)
Month	Jan	Feb	Mar	Apr	May	Jun	Jul	Aug	Sep	Oct	Nov	Dec	Year
Record high °F (°C)	83 (28)	84 (29)	93 (34)	96 (36)	102 (39)	105 (41)	107 (42)	106 (41)	106 (41)	101 (38)	88 (31)	80 (27)	107 (42)
Mean daily maximum °F (°C)	51.6 (10.9)	55.0 (12.8)	62.7 (17.1)	72.4 (22.4)	79.3 (26.3)	86.7 (30.4)	90.2 (32.3)	88.5 (31.4)	82.6 (28.1)	72.8 (22.7)	62.8 (17.1)	54.6 (12.6)	71.6 (22.0)
Daily mean °F (°C)	39.5 (4.2)	42.2 (5.7)	49.1 (9.5)	58.3 (14.6)	66.7 (19.3)	74.9 (23.8)	79.2 (26.2)	77.3 (25.2)	71.2 (21.8)	59.6 (15.3)	49.1 (9.5)	42.6 (5.9)	59.1 (15.1)
Mean daily minimum °F (°C)	27.5 (−2.5)	29.5 (−1.4)	35.5 (1.9)	44.2 (6.8)	54.1 (12.3)	63.1 (17.3)	68.1 (20.1)	66.2 (19.0)	59.9 (15.5)	46.4 (8.0)	35.4 (1.9)	30.5 (−0.8)	46.7 (8.2)
Record low °F (°C)	−10 (−23)	−6 (−21)	6 (−14)	18 (−8)	28 (−2)	35 (2)	41 (5)	37 (3)	33 (1)	16 (−9)	11 (−12)	−4 (−20)	−10 (−23)
Average rainfall inches (mm)	3.74 (95)	2.86 (73)	4.06 (103)	3.48 (88)	3.71 (94)	4.70 (119)	4.85 (123)	5.51 (140)	4.91 (125)	3.56 (90)	3.43 (87)	3.48 (88)	48.29 (1,225)
Average snowfall inches (cm)	0.9 (2.3)	0.4 (1.0)	0.2 (0.51)	0 (0)	0 (0)	0 (0)	0 (0)	0 (0)	0 (0)	0 (0)	0 (0)	0.2 (0.51)	1.7 (4.32)
Source: NOAA

== Demographics ==
Historical population
Census	Pop.	Note	%±
1870	750		—
1880	730		−2.7%
1890	667		−8.6%
1900	1,178		76.6%
1910	1,775		50.7%
1920	1,954		10.1%
1930	2,182		11.7%
1940	2,309		5.8%
1950	2,545		10.2%
1960	2,862		12.5%
1970	2,941		2.8%
1980	3,238		10.1%
1990	3,037		−6.2%
2000	3,111		2.4%
2010	3,359		8.0%
2020	3,064		−8.8%
U.S. Decennial Census

=== 2020 census ===
As of the 2020 census, Louisburg had a population of 3,064. The median age was 42.0 years. 16.5% of residents were under the age of 18 and 26.2% were 65 years of age or older. For every 100 females there were 87.5 males, and for every 100 females age 18 and over there were 85.0 males age 18 and over.

As of the 2020 census, 0.0% of residents lived in urban areas, while 100.0% lived in rural areas.

As of the 2020 census, there were 1,029 households in Louisburg, of which 28.3% had children under the age of 18 living in them. Of all households, 32.1% were married-couple households, 19.2% were households with a male householder and no spouse or partner present, and 44.4% were households with a female householder and no spouse or partner present. About 37.0% of all households were made up of individuals and 19.0% had someone living alone who was 65 years of age or older.

As of the 2020 census, there were 1,283 housing units, of which 19.8% were vacant. The homeowner vacancy rate was 3.2% and the rental vacancy rate was 13.6%.

Louisburg racial composition
Race	Number	Percentage
White (non-Hispanic)	1,446	47.19%
Black or African American (non-Hispanic)	1,261	41.16%
Native American	14	0.46%
Asian	41	1.34%
Other/Mixed	111	3.62%
Hispanic or Latino	191	6.23%

=== 2010 census ===
As of the census of 2010, there were 3,359 people, 1,197 households, and 654 families residing in the town. The population density was 1,199.6 inhabitants per square mile (463.2/km^{2}). The racial makeup of the town was 47.3% White, 46.9% African American, 0.3% Native American, 0.9% Asian, 0.0% Pacific Islander, 2.9% from other races, and 1.7% from two or more races. Hispanic or Latino of any race were 5.5% of the population.

There were 1,197 households, out of which 23.0% had children under the age of 18 living with them, 28.6% were married couples living together, 20.6% had a female householder with no husband present, and 45.4% were non-families. 40.3% of all households were made up of individuals, and 21.4% had someone living alone who was 65 years of age or older. The average household size was 2.17 and the average family size was 2.94.

In the town, the population was spread out, with 29.4% under the age of 20, 10.7% from 20 to 24, 15.8% from 25 to 44, 22.7% from 45 to 64, and 21.5% who were 65 years of age or older. The median age was 38.2 years. For every 100 females, there were 89.8 males. For every 100 females age 18 and over, there were 91.3 males.

The median income for a household in the town was $27,325, and the median income for a family was $72,583. Males had a median income of $49,375 versus $35,104 for females. The per capita income for the town was $18,529. About 15.7% of families and 23.7% of the population were below the poverty line, including 27.3% of those under age 18 and 19.8% of those age 65 or over.

=== Housing ===
There were 1,345 housing units at an average density of 480.4 per square mile (185.5/km^{2}). 11.0% of housing units were vacant.

There were 1,197 occupied housing units in the town. 511 were owner-occupied units (42.7%), while 686 were renter-occupied (57.3%). The homeowner vacancy rate was 4.7% of total units. The rental unit vacancy rate was 5.5%.

== Arts and culture ==
=== Historic sites ===
Cascine, Cooke House, Dean Farm, Franklin County Training School-Riverside Union School, Fuller House, Green Hill House, Louisburg Historic District, Main Building, Louisburg College, Massenburg Plantation, Person Place, Portridge, Rose Hill, Patty Person Taylor House, Thomas and Lois Wheless House, and Williamson House are listed on the National Register of Historic Places.

=== Franklin County Library ===
The county's main, or central, library is the Franklin County Library, located in Louisburg. There are three branches in other municipalities across the county as well as an outreach program through the Bookmobile.

=== The International Whistlers Convention ===
The International Whistlers Convention was an international competition for whistlers that originated from a folk festival in Louisburg. It was started in 1980 as the National Whistlers Convention, the first whistling convention in the world. Although mostly held in Louisburg, the convention was occasionally held in Japan and China. In addition to competitions, the convention also inducted individuals into the Whistlers Hall of Fame in addition to competitions. The convention was featured in the documentary Pucker Up: The Fine Art of Whistling. The last International Whistlers Convention was held in Louisburg in 2013. In 2016, the Japanese Whistling Confederation started a successor event, the biennial World Whistlers Convention.

== Government ==
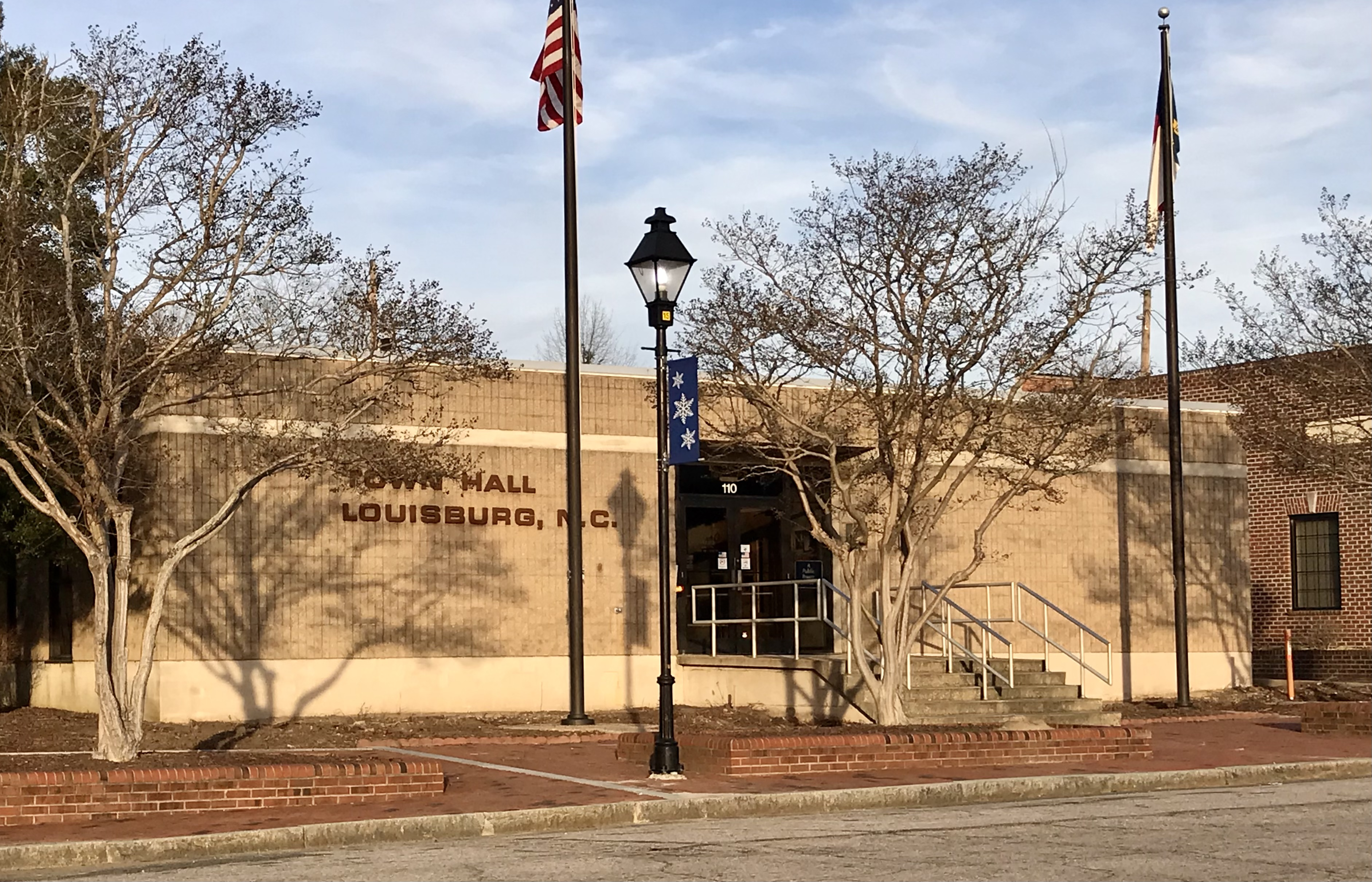
Louisburg Town Hall

Louisburg is governed by a mayor and town council. The town council has seven elected members, who all live within the Louisburg corporate limits. Councilmembers serve four year terms.

== Education ==
=== Franklin County Schools ===
The main office buildings of Franklin County Schools are located at 53 West River Road, Louisburg NC 27549 in the former Franklin County Training School-Riverside Union School. Franklin County Schools (FCS) consists of 15 schools and more than 8,500 students serving the towns of Franklinton, Louisburg, Youngsville and Bunn. There are eight elementary schools, three middle schools, three high schools, and one alternative school.

=== Louisburg College ===
Louisburg College is a two-year residential college located in Louisburg, North Carolina, that focuses on getting students ready for the next step to a four-year school offering baccalaureate degrees. The three degree programs offered: an Associate in Arts (general college degree), an Associate in Science (general science degree), and an Associate in Business degree. It also offers these special programs: Academy (tutoring support for ALL students), the Learning Partners Program (for students with learning disabilities and/or ADHD), and the Crossroads Program (for first-year students as they handle the transition from high school). Louisburg College has comprehensive transfer agreements with many public and private colleges and universities, including the 16 branches of the University of North Carolina system, that allow Louisburg College graduates to make a seamless transition upon entering four-year schools as full-fledged juniors.

== Infrastructure ==
=== Louisburg Police Department ===
The Louisburg Police Department was founded in 1779.

== Notable persons ==
- Thomas W. Bickett, governor of North Carolina
- Fanny Yarborough Bickett, First Lady of North Carolina and first female president of the North Carolina Railroad
- Wilbur F. Foster, politician, lawyer, member of the Alabama Legislature; born in Louisburg
- Charles H. Roberts, dentist, politician, one of the first two African Americans elected to the New York City Board of Aldermen, first African American nominated for Congress by the Republican Party in a northern state
