= National Register of Historic Places listings in Granville County, North Carolina =

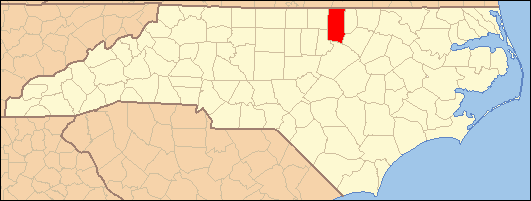

This list includes properties and districts listed on the National Register of Historic Places in Granville County, North Carolina. Click the "Map of all coordinates" link to the right to view an online map of all properties and districts with latitude and longitude coordinates in the table below.

This National Park Service list is complete through NPS recent listings posted April 10, 2026.

== Current listings ==
	Name on the Register	Image	Date listed	Location	City or town	Description
1	Abrams Plains		November 29, 1979 (#79001711)	NW of Stovall; 36°28′58″N 78°30′51″W	Stovall	
2	Adoniram Masonic Lodge		August 31, 1988 (#88001253)	Jct. of NC 1410 and NC 1300; 36°28′46″N 78°39′58″W	Cornwall	
3	Allen-Mangum House		April 28, 1988 (#88000410)	NC 1700; 36°06′20″N 78°37′02″W	Grissom	
4	Rufus Amis House and Mill		April 28, 1988 (#88000416)	Address Restricted	Virgilina	
5	James Blackwell House		April 28, 1988 (#88000407)	NC 1411; 36°27′39″N 78°41′29″W	Cornwall	
6	Bobbitt-Rogers House and Tobacco Manufactory District		August 31, 1988 (#88001262)	Address Restricted	Wilton	
7	Brassfield Baptist Church		August 31, 1988 (#88001267)	NC 96 and NC 1700; 36°06′54″N 78°34′30″W	Wilton	
8	Brookland		April 28, 1988 (#88000412)	NC 1443; 36°31′03″N 78°34′32″W	Grassy Creek	
9	Central Orphanage	Central Orphanage	August 31, 1988 (#88001257)	Antioch Dr. and Raleigh Rd. 36°17′35″N 78°34′21″W	Oxford	
10	Edgewood		April 28, 1988 (#88000421)	NC 1437; 36°30′27″N 78°38′08″W	Grassy Creek	
11	William Ellixson House		April 28, 1988 (#88000404)	Address Restricted	Wilbourns	
12	Elmwood		April 28, 1988 (#88000406)	Address Restricted	Lewis	
13	First National Bank Building	First National Bank Building	August 31, 1988 (#88001254)	302 Main St. 36°07′08″N 78°41′12″W	Creedmoor	
14	James W. Freeman House		April 28, 1988 (#88000411)	NC 1623; 36°10′18″N 78°33′19″W	Wilton	
15	Granville County Courthouse	Granville County Courthouse	May 10, 1979 (#79001710)	Main and Williamsboro Sts. 36°18′42″N 78°35′15″W	Oxford	
16	Harris-Currin House		August 31, 1988 (#88001258)	Address Restricted	Wilton	
17	Maurice Hart House		April 28, 1988 (#88000420)	NC 1430; 36°26′57″N 78°34′36″W	Stovall	
18	Hill Airy		October 29, 1974 (#74001349)	S of Stovall; 36°24′35″N 78°33′54″W	Stovall	
19	Joseph P. Hunt Farm	Joseph P. Hunt Farm	August 31, 1988 (#88001265)	NC 1514; 36°23′07″N 78°32′48″W	Dexter	Historic tobacco farm complex
20	John P. Lawrence Plantation		August 31, 1988 (#88001264)	NC 1700; 36°06′56″N 78°35′31″W	Grissom	
21	Joseph B. Littlejohn House	Joseph B. Littlejohn House	August 31, 1988 (#88001268)	219 Devin St. 36°18′43″N 78°34′49″W	Oxford	
22	Locust Lawn		April 28, 1988 (#88000422)	Address Restricted	Oxford	
23	Mount Energy Historic District		August 31, 1988 (#88001266)	NC 1636 and NC 56; 36°07′31″N 78°38′32″W	Mount Energy	
24	Oak Lawn		April 28, 1988 (#88000408)	Address Restricted	Huntsboro	
25	Oliver-Morton Farm		August 31, 1988 (#88001269)	NC 1417; 36°25′38″N 78°40′51″W	Oak Hill	
26	Oxford Historic District	Oxford Historic District	April 28, 1988 (#88000403)	Roughly bounded by College, New College and Gilliam and Raleigh, Front, Broad and Goshen and Hayes Sts.; also Rroughly bounded by Alexander and Sunset Aves., 3rd, Belle, Broad, Cherry, College, Devin, Franklin, Front, Gilliam, Granville, Henderson, Hillsboro, Lanier, Main, New College, Raleigh, and West Sts., and Martin Luther King Jr. Blvd. 36°18′41″N 78°35′25″W	Oxford	Second set of addresses represent boundary changes approved December 21, 2020
27	Paschall-Daniel House		June 4, 1992 (#88001263)	Address Restricted	Oxford	
28	John Mask Peace House		April 22, 2003 (#03000301)	NC 1613, approx. 0.5 miles SE of jct. with NC 1615 at Peace's Chapel; 36°13′15″N 78°30′41″W	Fairport	
29	John Peace Jr. House		April 28, 1988 (#88000405)	NC 1627; 36°09′08″N 78°31′09″W	Wilton	
30	Puckett Family Farm		April 28, 1988 (#88000423)	NC 1333; 36°22′02″N 78°40′09″W	Satterwhite	
31	Red Hill		August 14, 1986 (#86001632)	NC 1501; 36°31′44″N 78°31′13″W	Bullock	
32	Rose Hill		April 28, 1988 (#88000415)	NC 1442; 36°31′20″N 78°36′35″W	Grassy Creek	
33	John Henry Royster Farm		August 31, 1988 (#88001260)	Address Restricted; 36°30′33″N 78°33′09″W	Bullock	
34	Marcus Royster Plantation		April 28, 1988 (#88000409)	NC 96; 36°28′16″N 78°43′40″W	Wilbourns	
35	Saint Catherine of Siena Catholic Church		December 18, 2023 (#100009627)	305 Williamsboro Street; 36°18′48″N 78°35′08″W	Oxford	
35	Salem Methodist Church	Salem Methodist Church	August 31, 1988 (#88001259)	NC 1522; 36°21′01″N 78°32′22″W	Huntsboro	
36	Elijah Sherman Farm		August 31, 1988 (#88001256)	US 158; 36°19′46″N 78°46′47″W	Berea	
37	William G. Smith House		April 28, 1988 (#88000417)	NC 1527; 36°32′22″N 78°31′03″W	Bullock	
38	John W. Stovall Farm		August 31, 1988 (#88001270)	NC 1507; 36°27′22″N 78°33′23″W	Stovall	
39	Sycamore Valley		April 28, 1988 (#88000419)	NC 1400; 36°31′04″N 78°37′54″W	Grassy Creek	
40	Archibald Taylor Plantation House		October 20, 2001 (#01001132)	5632 Tabbs Creek Rd. 36°19′18″N 78°32′31″W	Oxford	
41	Col. Richard P. Taylor House		April 28, 1988 (#88000414)	NC 1524; 36°20′09″N 78°32′20″W	Huntsboro	
42	Thorndale	Thorndale	April 28, 1988 (#88000413)	213 W. Thorndale Dr. 36°18′12″N 78°36′23″W	Oxford	
43	Eldon B. Tunstall Farm		August 31, 1988 (#88001255)	NC 1500; 36°31′55″N 78°31′55″W	Bullock	
44	Lewis Wimbish Plantation		April 28, 1988 (#88000418)	NC 1443; 36°31′21″N 78°35′22″W	Grassy Creek	
45	Obediah Winston Farm		August 31, 1988 (#88001261)	NC 1638; 36°08′20″N 78°40′02″W	Creedmoor	

== See also ==
- National Register of Historic Places listings in North Carolina
- List of National Historic Landmarks in North Carolina
