= Oliver House =

Oliver House or Oliver Farm may refer to:

in the United States

(by state)

- Ernest McCarty Oliver House, LaFayette, AL, listed on the National Register of Historic Places (NRHP) in Chambers County, Alabama
- Oliver House (Bisbee, Arizona), a bed and breakfast in Cochise County, Arizona
- Oliver House (Corning, Arkansas), listed on the NRHP in Clay County, Arkansas
- Joseph D. Oliver House, South Bend, IN, listed on the NRHP in St. Joseph County, Indiana
- Big Spring School-Oliver Farmstead, Settle, KY, listed on the NRHP in Allen County, Kentucky
- Oliver House, (Middleborough, Massachusetts), estate built in 1769 by loyalist Dr. Peter Oliver Jr.
- Oliver House (Wakefield, Massachusetts)
- Captain John Oliver House, Lakeland, MN, listed on the NRHP in Washington County, Minnesota
- Oliver Boarding House, Marble, MN, listed on the NRHP in Itasca County, Minnesota
- Oliver House (Moscow, Mississippi), listed on the NRHP in Kemper County, Mississippi
- Oliver-Leming House, Cape Girardeau, MO, listed on the NRHP in Cape Girardeau County, Missouri
- Bennett-Tobler-Pace-Oliver House, Jackson, MO, listed on the NRHP in Cape Girardeau County, Missouri
- Thomas Oliver House, Lockport, NY, listed on the NRHP in Niagara County, New York
- Beardsley-Oliver House, Olean, NY, listed on the NRHP in Cattaraugus County, New York
- Oliver–Morton Farm, Oak Hill, NC, listed on the NRHP in Granville County, North Carolina
- Attmore–Oliver House, New Bern, NC, listed on the NRHP in Craven County, North Carolina
- Nowell-Mayerburg-Oliver House, Selma, NC, listed on the NRHP in Johnston County, North Carolina
- John G. Oliver House, Mentor, OH, listed on the NRHP in Lake County, Ohio
- Oliver House, Toledo, Ohio
- Oliver House, an alternative name for George Taylor House (Corvallis, Oregon), listed on the NRHP in Benton County, Oregon
- Oliver House (Cade's Cove, Tennessee)
- Dr. William Holt Oliver House, Bryan, TX, listed on the NRHP in Brazos County, Texas
- Owen and Margaret Oliver House, Genesee, WI, listed on the NRHP in Waukesha County, Wisconsin
- Joseph B. Oliver House, Milwaukee, WI, listed on the NRHP in Milwaukee County, Wisconsin
