= Brassfield Baptist Church =

Historic church in North Carolina, United States

- U.S. National Register of Historic Places
- Location within North Carolina
- Location: NC 96 and NC 1700, near Wilton, North Carolina
- Coordinates: 36°6′54″N 78°34′30″W
- Area: 4.8 acres (1.9 ha)
- Built: 1843
- Architectural style: Greek Revival
- MPS: Granville County MPS
- NRHP reference No.: 88001267
- Added to NRHP: August 31, 1988

Brassfield Baptist Church is a historic Baptist church located near Wilton, Granville County, North Carolina. It was listed on the National Register of Historic Places in 1988.

== History ==
Brassfield Baptist Church was constituted on August 23, 1823, by elders Zachariah Allen, James Weathers and William Worrel. The current historical building was constructed about 1843, and is a two-story, heavy timber frame, Greek Revival-style church building. Also on the property is the contributing church cemetery.

== See also ==
- National Register of Historic Places listings in Granville County, North Carolina
