= Culbreth, North Carolina =

Unincorporated community in North Carolina, US

Coordinates: 36°15′50″N 78°43′39″W

Culbreth is a small unincorporated community in Granville County, North Carolina, United States. It is north of the town of Stem.
