= John Henry Royster Farm =

Historic farm in North Carolina, United States

- U.S. National Register of Historic Places
- U.S. Historic district
- Location within North Carolina Location within the United States
- Nearest city: Bullock, North Carolina
- Coordinates: 36.5091°N 78.5525°W
- Area: 11 acres (4.5 ha)
- Built: 1860
- Architect: Holt, Jacob
- Architectural style: Greek Revival, Gothic Revival
- MPS: Granville County MPS
- NRHP reference No.: 88001260
- Added to NRHP: August 31, 1988

John Henry Royster Farm is a historic tobacco farm complex and national historic district located near Bullock, Granville County, North Carolina. The farmhouse was built about 1860, and is a two-story, heavy timber frame dwelling. It features Greek Revival and Gothic Revival style design elements patterned after regional architect Jacob W. Holt. Also on the property are the contributing garage, corn crib, shed, dairy, smokehouse, chicken house, brooder house, a square notched log striphouse, two-square-notched log tobacco barns, a metal-sheathed log tobacco barn and a frame packhouse.

It was listed on the National Register of Historic Places in 1988.
