= William G. Smith House (Bullock, North Carolina) =

Historic house in North Carolina, United States

- U.S. National Register of Historic Places
- U.S. Historic district
- Location within North Carolina Location within the United States
- Location: NC 1527, near Bullock, North Carolina
- Coordinates: 36°32′22″N 78°31′3″W
- Area: 1 acre (0.40 ha)
- Built: c. 1790
- Architectural style: Georgian, Federal
- MPS: Granville County MPS
- NRHP reference No.: 88000417
- Added to NRHP: April 28, 1988

William G. Smith House is a historic plantation house and national historic district located near Bullock, Granville County, North Carolina. It was built about 1790, and is a Georgian / Federal style dwelling consisting of a central two-story block flanked by one-story wings. Also on the property is a contributing smokehouse.

It was listed on the National Register of Historic Places in 1988.
