= Amis House =

Amis Housee may refer to:

- Amis House (Fordyce, Arkansas)
- Amis-Elder House, Crawford, GA, listed on the NRHP in Georgia
- Tidwell-Amis-Haynes House, Senoia, GA, listed on the NRHP in Georgia
- Amis-Bragg House, Jackson, NC
- Rufus Amis House and Mill, Virgilina, NC
- Prewitt-Amis-Finney House, Culleoka, TN
- Jonathan Amis House, McCains, TN
- Amis House (Rogersville, Tennessee)
