= Eldon B. Tunstall Farm =

Historic farm in North Carolina, United States

- U.S. National Register of Historic Places
- U.S. Historic district
- Location within North Carolina Location within the United States
- Location: NC 1500, near Bullock, North Carolina
- Coordinates: 36°31′55″N 78°31′55″W
- Area: 40 acres (16 ha)
- Built: 1907
- Built by: Bolden, Tom
- Architectural style: I-house
- MPS: Granville County MPS
- NRHP reference No.: 88001255
- Added to NRHP: August 31, 1988

Eldon B. Tunstall Farm is a historic tobacco farm complex and national historic district located near Bullock, Granville County, North Carolina. The farmhouse was built about 1907, and is a two-story, three-bay, frame I-house, with a one-story full facade porch. Also on the property are the contributing dairy, smokehouse, well house, log corn crib, log horse and mule barn, packhouse, striphouse, ordering house, garage, shop, chicken house, three V-notched log tobacco barns, and a former store.

It was listed on the National Register of Historic Places in 1988.
