= Grassy Creek, North Carolina =

Grassy Creek, North Carolina may refer to:

- Grassy Creek, Ashe County, North Carolina, an unincorporated community
- Grassy Creek, Granville County, North Carolina, site of several buildings listed on the National Register of Historic Places in Granville County
- Grassy Creek (North Carolina), a stream in Surry County, North Carolina
