= Oak Lawn =

Oak Lawn may refer to:

== United States ==
- Oak Lawn, Illinois, a suburb southwest of Chicago, Illinois
  - Oak Lawn station
- Oak Lawn (Ridgely, Maryland), listed on the NRHP
- Oak Lawn (Huntsboro, North Carolina), listed on the NRHP
- Oak Lawn, Dallas, a neighborhood in Dallas, Texas
- Oak Lawn (Charlottesville, Virginia), a historic home
- Oak Lawn (Madison Heights, Virginia), a historic home
- Oak Lawn (Washington, D.C.), a former estate and home

== See also ==
- 1967 Oak Lawn tornado outbreak
- Oaklawn Cemetery (disambiguation)
- Oaklawn Plantation (disambiguation)
