= Red Hill (Bullock, North Carolina) =

Historic house in North Carolina, United States

- U.S. National Register of Historic Places
- Location within North Carolina Location within the United States
- Location: NC 1501, near Bullock, North Carolina
- Coordinates: 36°31′44″N 78°31′13″W
- Area: 5 acres (2.0 ha)
- Built: c. 1776, c. 1807, c. 1820
- Architectural style: Greek Revival, Georgian, Federal
- NRHP reference No.: 86001632
- Added to NRHP: August 14, 1986

Red Hill is a historic plantation house located near Bullock, Granville County, North Carolina, United States. The house consists of three parts: a 1 1/2-story, two-bay gambrel-roofed Georgian style center block built about 1776; a 1 1/2-story, two-bay one-room, gable-roofed Georgian style block with transitional Federal features, built about 1807; and a very tall two-story, three-bay, transitional Federal/ Greek Revival style addition, built about 1820, style frame I-house dwelling. It has a full basement, full-width front porch, and exterior brick chimneys. Across from the house is the 2 1/2-story heavy timber frame tobacco manufactory. Also on the property are the contributing wash house / striphouse, open wellhouse, smokehouse, privy, and flower house / chicken house.

It was listed on the National Register of Historic Places in 1986.
