= William Ellixson House =

Historic farm in North Carolina, United States

- U.S. National Register of Historic Places
- U.S. Historic district
- Nearest city: Wilbourns, North Carolina
- Area: 14 acres (5.7 ha)
- Built: c. 1800
- Architectural style: Georgian, Federal
- MPS: Granville County MPS
- NRHP reference No.: 88000404
- Added to NRHP: April 28, 1988

William Ellixson House is a historic home and national historic district located at Wilbourns, Granville County, North Carolina. It was built about 1800, and is a 1 1/2-story, small Georgian / Federal style frame dwelling. It has a cut stone foundation, steeply pitched gable roof, and double-shouldered brick exterior end chimneys. Also on the property are the contributing packhouse and two log tobacco barns.

It was listed on the National Register of Historic Places in 1988.
