= Creedmoor, North Carolina =

- City
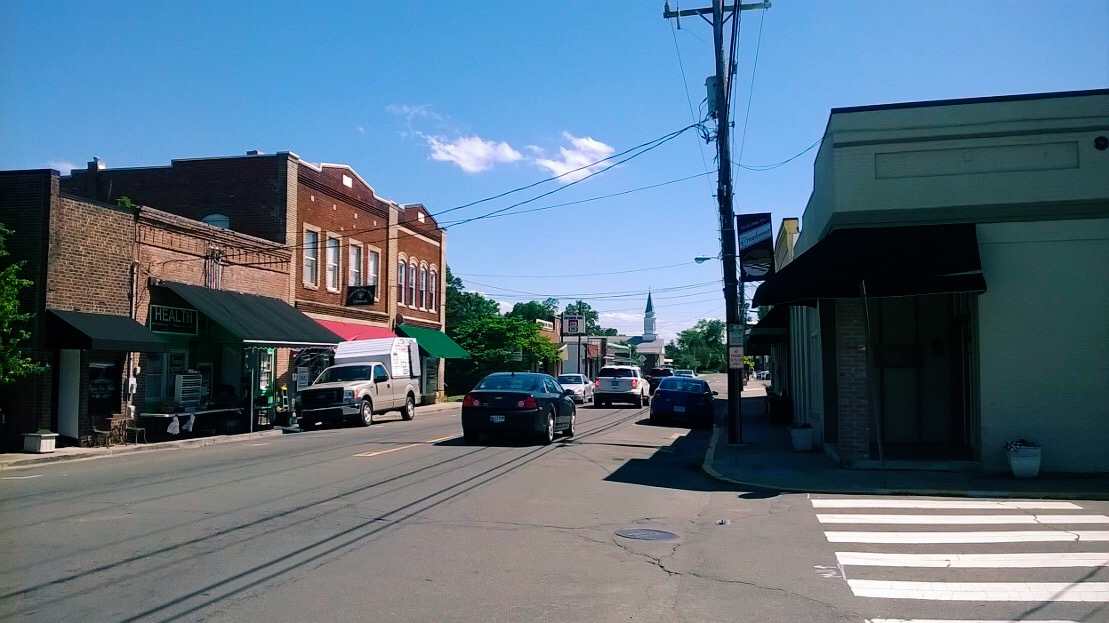
- Nickname: Mule Town
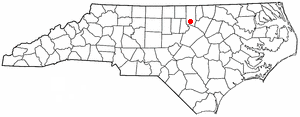
- Location of Creedmoor, North Carolina
- Coordinates: 36°07′20″N 78°40′33″W
- Country: United States
- State: North Carolina
- County: Granville
- Founded: April 10, 1885
- Incorporated: 1905

Government
  - Founder: Robert Fleming
  - Mayor: Antwane Downey
  - Incorporator: Thomas Lyon

Area
  - Total: 5.59 sq mi (14.48 km^{2})
  - Land: 5.35 sq mi (13.85 km^{2})
  - Water: 0.24 sq mi (0.63 km^{2})
- Elevation: 354 ft (108 m)

Population (2020)
  - Total: 4,866
  - Density: 910.2/sq mi (351.44/km^{2})
- Time zone: UTC-5 (Eastern (EST))
  - Summer (DST): UTC-4 (EDT)
- ZIP codes: 27522, 27564
- Area code: 919
- FIPS code: 37-15320
- GNIS feature ID: 2404147
- Website: www.cityofcreedmoor.org

Creedmoor is a city in Granville County, North Carolina, United States. As of the 2020 census, Creedmoor had a population of 4,866.

== History ==
In 1885, a group of 25 taxpayers of Granville County, including Civil War Confederate veteran Robert Fleming, appeared before the Board of Commissioners for the County of Granville with a petition from the Dutchville Township. The petition made a proposition to subscribe ten thousand dollars to the capital stock of the Oxford and Clarksville Railroad Company. Under the provisions of the act of the General Assembly of North Carolina which was entitled "An Act to Incorporate", the Oxford and Clarksville Railroad Company was notified on 28 February 1885. The proposal was thereby approved under the provisions of the General Assembly of North Carolina. As a result, it was ordered that the election of subscribing the said sum of ten thousand dollars to the capital stock of the said railroad company be submitted to the qualified voters of the Dutchville Township and that an election be held in the said township at the proper voting place therein on 8 October 1887.

Over the next few years, Creedmoor served as a railroad depot between the Clarksville and Oxford Railroad and the Raleigh and Gaston Railroad. In 1886, Thomas B. Lyon applied to the Postal Department for a post office to be located in Creedmoor. Lyon's request was granted on 10 April 1886. John Harmon was appointed as the first postmaster. In September of that same year, Samuel C. Lyon, son of Thomas B. Lyon, was appointed postmaster.

In 1888 Lyon sold part of his land to the Durham and Northern Railroad for track to run through the town. Linking Creedmoor to Henderson and Durham was a major cause of growth of this town. The old Seaboard train depot building still stands at its location on Elm Street, making it over 120 years old. Also previously located on Elm Street was the original First Baptist Church of Creedmoor, built in 1895. The present church building from 1950 stands on Main Street. Lyon's body is entombed on the grounds of the original cemetery for the church, whereas Robert Fleming's body is entombed in a small family plot on Fleming Street, a road named for the founder, adjacent to Elm Street.

Creedmoor was incorporated in 1905, having previously been known as "Creedmore". The first mayor was Joseph L. Peed (1859–1936). The street Joe Peed Road located on southbound US-15 leaving the city is named in his honor. The first Commissioners were J.F. Sanderford, Isaac Bullock, S.C. Lyon, and Claude Garner. In 1917, electricity came to Creedmoor when G. H. Dove and F. J. McDuffy flipped a switch in their plant on Railroad Street.

Although the town is rich with history (home to four buildings on the National Register of Historic Places), it does not hold the title of a Historic District unlike nearby Oxford and Wake Forest.

=== Impact of tobacco ===
Tobacco was extremely important in the early history of the town. Four tobacco warehouses were built in the town in the early 1900s. Tobacco was a cash crop in Creedmoor, and was shipped by railroad to nearby Oxford's Tobacco Research Facility and Durham's thriving smoking tobacco industry, with firms including W. T. Blackwell and Company, American Tobacco Company, and Liggett & Myers. At one time Creedmoor was a larger tobacco market than Durham. Area farmers did not limit themselves to tobacco only, but also grew cotton, a profitable crop.

=== The mule trade ===
In the wake of the tobacco era, mules came to Creedmoor. About forty train car loads of mules were pulled into the town each year. Mules were the ideal farm animals because their hooves were smaller than those of a horse. Their smaller feet helped them pass through rows of tobacco without stepping on the crop. In 1906, Jim Netherly and a Mr. Cooper founded the Creedmoor Supply Company, which sold feed, mules, horses, buggies, and even some groceries and seeds to meet the demands of local farmers. G.M. Chappell opened a barn that auctioned mules, horses, and cows from 1938 to 1962. At one point in time, Creedmoor was considered to be the largest mule trading center in the world and was widely referred to as "Mule Town". By 1940, over $500,000 were traded and spent on mules each year. It was not until the mid-1950s that the town removed the slogan "One of the Largest Retail Livestock Markets in North Carolina" from the official letterhead. By then, the mule trade was no longer a major part of the local economy.

== Historic places ==
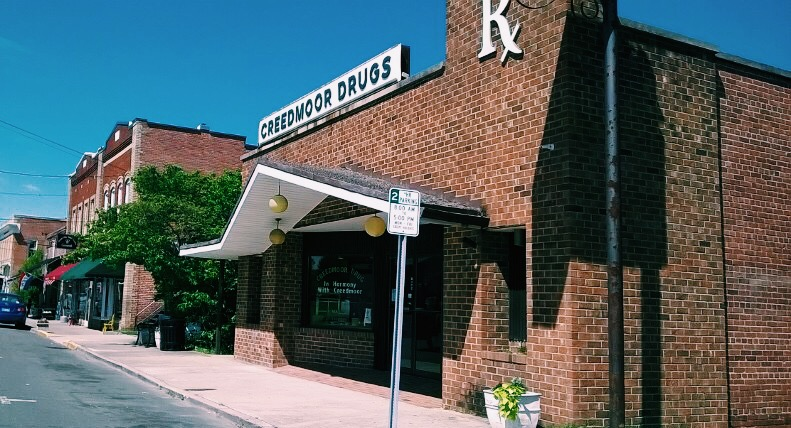
Creedmoor Drugs

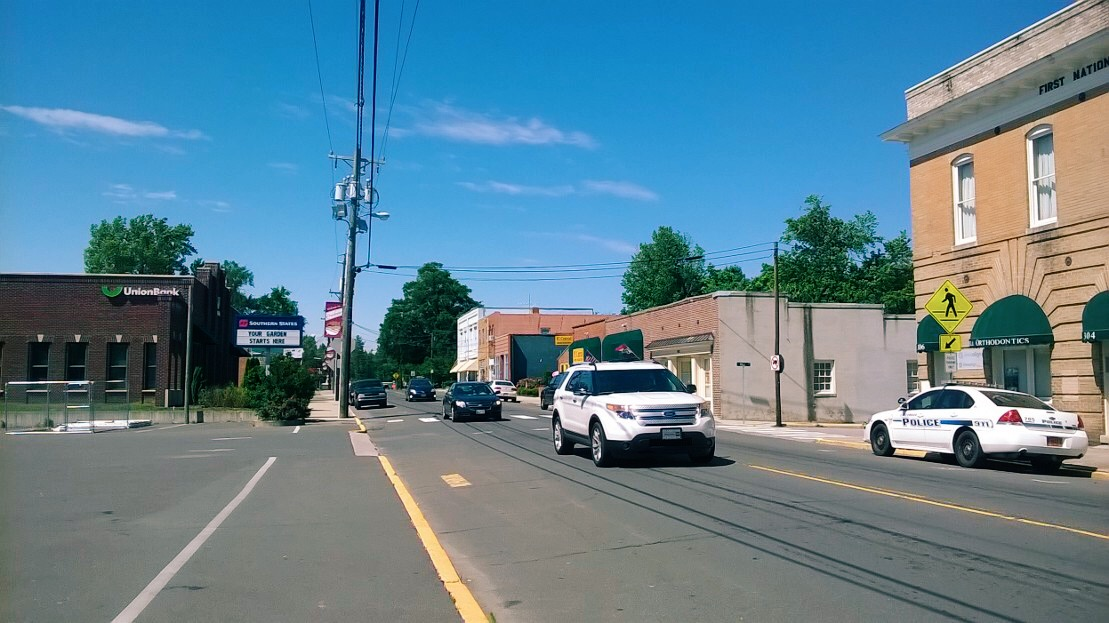
Downtown Creedmoor

Creedmoor is home to four buildings listed on the National Register of Historic Places:

- Cannady-Brogden Farm south of Creedmoor in Wake County
- James Mangum House
- First National Bank Building
- Obediah Winston Farm

== Education ==
Creedmoor High School opened in 1909 at the intersection of Main Street and Highway 56. Joel Anderson Pitts (1877–1958), a graduate of Duke University – then called Trinity College – was the first principal. This school served grades one through twelve until 1963, when white students went to South Granville High School. On January 9, 1970, Creedmoor School, at that time serving grades one through eight, burned down. Behind the former Creedmoor High School gym lies B.C. Roberts Ballfield, named after Battle Caviness Roberts who coached for the South Granville Athletic Association well into his years before his death in 1982.

Creedmoor is also the home of South Granville High School, G.C. Hawley Middle, and Creedmoor Elementary. The Hawley School, dedicated in 1937 for educationalist Rev. Grover Cleveland Hawley, originally educated the local black students. The opening of the school was bolstered by the support of Dr. R.G. Rogers(1882-1952), a graduate of Trinity College and the Medical College of Virginia, Creedmoor town physician and dentist, who was a member of the Granville County Board of Education at that time. He and Professor Hawley met many times in his home on Rail Road Street ( Now Elm Street) to discuss the plans for the school. His support was instrumental on the board. The doors to Hawley School first opened for all local black students in September 1952 after many years of tireless and dedicated work spearheaded by Reverend Hawley. The new facility housed grades seven through twelve. In 1975, Hawley became a middle school serving grades five through eight from the Butner, Stem, and Creedmoor areas and eighth graders from Wilton. In September 1986, seventh graders from Wilton Elementary were moved to Hawley, and in 1987 sixth graders from Wilton also began to attend Hawley. At the present time, Hawley Middle School teaches grades six through eight from the Creedmoor and Wilton area. Students from Butner and Stem now attend Butner-Stem Middle School.

== Other notable places ==
- The Dr. Joseph Thompson house at 213 S. Main Street belonged to the town's first medical doctor and had an office in his home to the right of the building on the main floor. There is a porte-cochère that extends off that side as well. The home is an early Craftsman period structure with a wrap-around porch. It was built in 1910 on land purchased from the Lyon family. Dr. Thompson was a native of Leasburg in Caswell County. He attended the University of North Carolina as an undergraduate before going to the University of Louisville School of Medicine for his medical degree. He moved to Creedmoor about 1908. He married Mayme Lunsford in 1910 and moved her to their home on Main Street (at that time, a four-room, one-story cottage). He practiced medicine in northern Wake and southern Granville County until 1957 and died at home in August 1958.
- The Cedar Creek Gallery was built in 1968 on what used to be an old tobacco field in the community of Northside. The gallery has grown from one building to over ten.
- Creedmoor Cemetery, located beside Creedmoor Elementary on Highway 56, is the final resting place of many prominent figures from the early days of Creedmoor. Entombed are the families of Rogers, Chappell, Lyon, Peed, Mangum, Currin, Bragg, Mitchell, Roberts, Wheeler, Aiken, and many others.

== Media ==
Like most towns, Creedmoor has a variety of media. Some of the more notable are listed below.

=== Newspapers ===
- The Butner-Creedmoor News - The local newspaper company was established in 1965 within the former USO building on Creedmoor's Main Street.

Other newspapers distributed throughout the city are:

- The Herald-Sun, from Durham
- The News & Observer, from Raleigh
- The Oxford Ledger
- The Franklin Times

=== Radio stations ===
- WCMC-FM 99.9 FM - The Fan - Sports
- W256AH 99.1 FM (WRTP) - Christian Contemporary
- WDRU 1030 AM - Religious

=== Local TV stations ===
- WTVD - ABC - Durham/ Raleigh, NC
- WRAL-TV - NBC - Raleigh, NC
- WRAZ (TV) - Fox - Raleigh/ Durham/ Fayetteville, NC
- WNCN - CBS - Raleigh/ Durham/ Goldsboro, NC
- WLFL - The CW - Raleigh/ Durham/ Fayetteville, NC
- WRDC - MyNetworkTV - Raleigh/ Durham/ Fayetteville, NC
- WUNC-TV PBS - Chapel Hill

== Geography ==
Creedmoor is located in southern Granville County and is bordered to the west by the town of Butner.

U.S. Route 15 passes through Creedmoor as Durham Avenue, leading north 14 miles (23 km) to Oxford, the Granville County seat, and southwest 16 miles (26 km) to Durham. North Carolina Highway 56 crosses US 15 just west of the center of town. To the east, as Wilton Avenue, it leads 13 miles (21 km) to Franklinton, and to the west, as Lake Road, it leads 2.5 miles (4.0 km) to Interstate 85 and 5 miles (8 km) to the center of Butner. Interstate 85 leads southwest to Durham and northeast 112 miles (180 km) to Petersburg, Virginia.

According to the United States Census Bureau, Creedmoor has a total area of 4.8 square miles (12.4 km^{2}), of which 4.6 square miles (11.9 km^{2}) is land and 0.23 square miles (0.6 km^{2}), or 4.66%, is water.

Lake Rogers, a 175-acre (0.71 km^{2}) lake that offers picnicking, fishing, playground and boating accommodations, is in the northwest part of the city. Creedmoor is within the Neuse River watershed.

== Demographics ==
Historical population
Census	Pop.	Note	%±
1910	324		—
1920	392		21.0%
1930	388		−1.0%
1940	640		64.9%
1950	852		33.1%
1960	862		1.2%
1970	1,405		63.0%
1980	1,641		16.8%
1990	1,504		−8.3%
2000	2,232		48.4%
2010	4,124		84.8%
2020	4,866		18.0%
U.S. Decennial Census

=== 2020 census ===
Creedmoor racial composition
Race	Number	Percentage
White (non-Hispanic)	2,271	46.67%
Black or African American (non-Hispanic)	1,809	37.18%
Native American	16	0.33%
Asian	61	1.25%
Other/Mixed	245	5.03%
Hispanic or Latino	464	9.54%

As of the 2020 census, Creedmoor had a population of 4,866. The median age was 38.2 years. 24.7% of residents were under the age of 18 and 13.8% of residents were 65 years of age or older. For every 100 females there were 90.5 males, and for every 100 females age 18 and over there were 86.3 males age 18 and over.

96.3% of residents lived in urban areas, while 3.7% lived in rural areas.

There were 1,815 households in Creedmoor, including 1,291 family households, of which 39.7% had children under the age of 18 living in them. Of all households, 48.5% were married-couple households, 15.6% were households with a male householder and no spouse or partner present, and 28.9% were households with a female householder and no spouse or partner present. About 24.3% of all households were made up of individuals and 9.9% had someone living alone who was 65 years of age or older.

There were 1,953 housing units, of which 7.1% were vacant. The homeowner vacancy rate was 1.5% and the rental vacancy rate was 9.0%.

=== 2010 census ===
As of the census of 2010, there were 4,124 people in 1,550 households residing in the city. The population density was 1,330.3 inhabitants per square mile (513.6/km^{2}). There were 1,728 housing units at an average density of 557.4 per square mile (215.2/km^{2}). The racial makeup of the city was 59.5% White, 35.2% African American, 0.6% Native American, 0.8% Asian, 1.7% from other races, and 2.1% from two or more races. Hispanic or Latino of any race were 5.0% of the population.

There were 1,550 households, out of which 37.2% had children under the age of 18 living with them. The average household size was 2.66. In the city, the population was spread out, with 27.3% under the age of 18, 6.5% from 18 to 24, 13.5% from 25 to 34, 25.9% from 35 to 49, 16.3% from 50 to 64, and 10.5% who were 65 years of age or older. For every 100 females, there were 91.8 males.

The median income for a household in the city was $60,417, and the mean income for a household was $66,187. The median and mean family income was $68,109 and $71,772, respectively. The per capita income for the city was $23,697. About 10.5% of families and 13.1% of the population were below the poverty line, including 15.8% of those under age 18 and 20.9% of those age 65 or over.

== Schools ==
- Creedmoor Elementary School of the Arts
- Mount Energy Elementary
- South Granville High School of Integrated Technology and Leadership
- South Granville High School of Health and Life Sciences
- Granville Early College High School
