= John Penn (North Carolina politician) =

American Founding Father and politician (1741-1788)

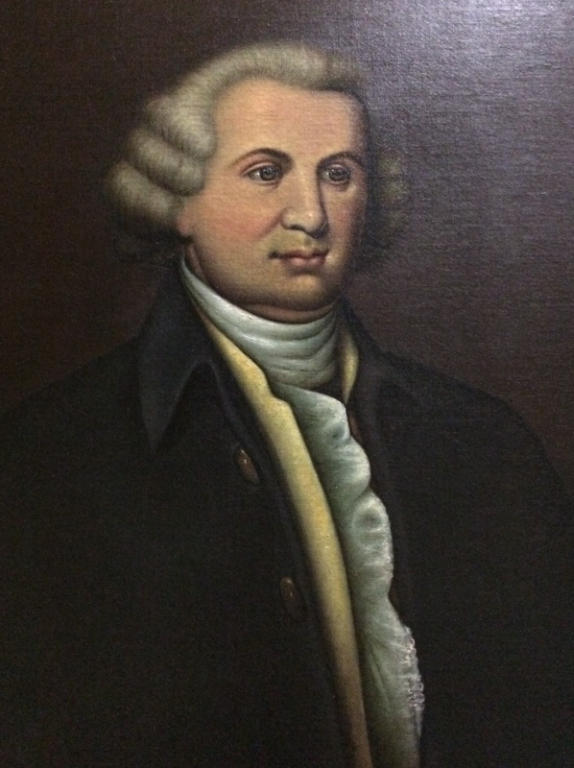
- John Penn
- Born: May 17, 1741; Caroline County, Virginia, British America
- Died: September 14, 1788 (aged 47); Stovall, North Carolina Area, Granville County, North Carolina, U.S.
- Resting place: Guilford Courthouse National Military Park
- Occupation: lawyer
- Known for: signer of the United States Declaration of Independence

John Penn (May 17, 1741 – September 14, 1788) was an American Founding Father who served multiple terms in the Continental Congress, and who signed both the Declaration of Independence and Articles of Confederation as a delegate of North Carolina.

== Biography ==
Penn was born near Port Royal in Caroline County, Virginia, and was the son of Moses Penn and Catherine (Taylor) Penn. He attended at common school for two years as his father did not consider education to be important. At age 18, after his father's death, Penn privately read law with his uncle, Edmund Pendleton. He became a lawyer in Virginia in 1762.

On July 28, 1763, Penn married Susannah Lyne. The couple had three children. Their daughter, Lucy, married John Taylor of Caroline, a political leader from Virginia.

In 1774, Penn moved to the Stovall, North Carolina. There, he was a representative at the colony's Third Provincial Congress in August 1775. In 1775 Penn was elected to the Continental Congress. He was re-elected in 1777, 1778 and 1779 and is said to have served with distinction. During his tenure, he signed the Declaration of Independence and the Articles of Confederation.

In 1780 Penn was appointed to the North Carolina board of war. Following his appointment to the Congress, he practiced law until his death in 1788.

== Legacy ==
The naval ship USS John Penn was named in his honor. A historical highway marker honoring Penn was erected near his home in Stovall in 1936; it was the first such marker erected by the state of North Carolina.

== See also ==
- Memorial to the 56 Signers of the Declaration of Independence
- Joseph Penn Hunt Farm
- Joseph Penn Breedlove

== Sources ==
- Goodrich, Charles A. (1842). Lives of the signers of the Declaration of Independence. Hartford : R.G.H. Huntington.
- Hamilton, J. G.deR. (1934). Malone, Dumas (ed.). Dictionary of American biography. Vol. XIV.
  New York: Charles Scribner's Sons.
