= Obediah Winston Farm =

Historic farm in North Carolina, United States

- U.S. National Register of Historic Places
- U.S. Historic district
- Location within North Carolina Location within the United States
- Location: NC 1638, near Creedmoor, North Carolina
- Coordinates: 36°08′20″N 78°40′02″W
- Area: 38 acres (15 ha)
- Built: c. 1855
- Architectural style: Greek Revival
- MPS: Granville County MPS
- NRHP reference No.: 88001261
- Added to NRHP: August 31, 1988

Obediah Winston Farm is a historic tobacco farm complex and national historic district located near Creedmoor, Granville County, North Carolina. The farmhouse was built about 1855, and is a two-story, five-bay, Greek Revival style heavy timber frame dwelling. Also on the property are the contributing log outbuilding, slave house, potato house, stable, smokehouse, packhouse, tobacco barn, and tenant house.

It was listed on the National Register of Historic Places in 1988.
