= Harris–Currin House =

Historic farm in North Carolina, United States

- U.S. National Register of Historic Places
- U.S. Historic district
- Nearest city: Wilton, North Carolina
- Area: 21 acres (8.5 ha)
- Built: c. 1883
- Architectural style: Queen Anne
- MPS: Granville County MPS
- NRHP reference No.: 88001258
- Added to NRHP: August 31, 1988

Harris–Currin House is a historic home and national historic district located at Wilton, Granville County, North Carolina. It was built about 1883, and is a two-story, "L"-plan Queen Anne style frame dwelling. It features a wraparound porch decorated with sawn woodwork and one-story rear kitchen and dining room ell.

It was listed on the National Register of Historic Places in 1988.
