= John Peace Jr. House =

Historic house in North Carolina, United States

- U.S. National Register of Historic Places
- U.S. Historic district
- Location within North Carolina Location within the United States
- Location: NC 1627, near Wilton, North Carolina
- Coordinates: 36°09′08″N 78°31′09″W
- Area: 21 acres (8.5 ha)
- Built: c. 1801
- Architectural style: Georgian, Federal
- MPS: Granville County MPS
- NRHP reference No.: 88000405
- Added to NRHP: April 28, 1988

John Peace Jr. House is a historic home and national historic district located near Wilton, Granville County, North Carolina. It was built about 1801, and is a 1 1/2-story, three-bay, heavy timber frame dwelling with Georgian / Federal style design elements. It features a massive double shouldered carved "gray rock" end chimney.

It was listed on the National Register of Historic Places in 1988.
