= Marcus Royster Plantation =

Historic farm in North Carolina, United States

- U.S. National Register of Historic Places
- U.S. Historic district
- Location within North Carolina Location within the United States
- Location: NC 96, near Wilbourns, North Carolina
- Coordinates: 36°28′16″N 78°43′40″W
- Area: 307 acres (124 ha)
- Built: c. 1850
- Architectural style: Greek Revival
- MPS: Granville County MPS
- NRHP reference No.: 88000409
- Added to NRHP: April 28, 1988

Marcus Royster Plantation is a historic tobacco plantation house and national historic district located near Wilbourns, Granville County, North Carolina. The house was built about 1850, and is a two-story, three-bay, "T"-plan, heavy timber frame Greek Revival style dwelling. It has a low hipped roof and classical portico. Also on the property are the contributing air-curing barn, smokehouse, two log tobacco barns, log corn crib, two frame barns, a small log barn, frame smokehouse, and a frame former tenant house.

It was listed on the National Register of Historic Places in 1988.
