= Joseph Penn Breedlove =

American librarian

Duke University Librarian
- In office: 1898-1939 Librarian; 1939-1943 Librarian Emeritus; 1943-1946 Acting Librarian; 1946-1955 Librarian Emeritus; – (Retired 1939 & 1946)
- Preceded by: George B. Pegram
- Succeeded by: John J. Lund (1939); Benjamin E. Powell (1946)

Personal details
- Born: July 14, 1874 Granville County, North Carolina, U.S.
- Died: May 24, 1955 (aged 80) Durham, North Carolina, U.S.
- Resting place: Maplewood Cemetery
- Spouses: Bessie W. Bassett (m. 1905); Lucile Aiken (m. 1917)
- Education: Trinity College (AB, MA)
- Occupation: Librarian, author

Joseph Penn Breedlove (1874–1955) was an American librarian and author. In 48 years of service, he oversaw the growth of the Duke University Library (originally Trinity College) from a single room in 1898 to millions of books and documents in modern facilities at his retirement in 1946. He was a founding member and twice president of the North Carolina Library Association. His history of the Duke University libraries was published in 1955.

== Early life ==
Breedlove was born in 1874 at the Joseph P. Hunt Farm in Granville County, North Carolina near Oxford, to John Henry Breedlove, owner of the Breedlove Mill, and Susan Caroline Hunt Breedlove, a descendant of North Carolina Declaration of Independence signer John Penn. He was educated at Horner Military School, followed by a year at the University of North Carolina Chapel Hill. He transferred to Trinity College, completing a B.A. in 1898 and an M.A. in 1902, both in English. While at Trinity he played on the baseball team and was a member of the 9019 Society, Kappa Alpha Order, Omicron Delta Kappa, and Phi Beta Kappa.

== Career ==
Breedlove was appointed by Trinity College president John Carlisle Kilgo as the full-time librarian in September 1898. The library at that time consisted of some 11,000 volumes donated by faculty and literary societies, housed in a single room in the Washington Duke Building. His first task was to catalog and classify the library's contents. In 1900, he studied library science under William I. Fletcher at Amherst College and also consulted with Charles Ammi Cutter. Upon his return, he implemented the Dewey Decimal System and standardized the card catalog system. In 1902, he completed a practicum under Bernard Christian Steiner at the Enoch Pratt Free Library in Baltimore.

He "worked hard to raise the library's profile and importance on campus" and, as the collection grew, he labored to manage the flood of donations and purchases amid staff shortages. Breedlove was able to supplement his team of part-time student assistants with the hiring in 1914 of a full-time professional cataloger, Eva Earnshaw Malone, former librarian at Meredith College. She was joined by Mary Wescott in 1920 and Catherine Cuzner in 1923. By the end of 1924, seven full-time employees were on the staff. Malone remained until retiring in 1941 as assistant librarian.

He was involved in the planning for three new library buildings, each necessitating a transfer of the entire collection. In 1902, a major gift by James Buchanan Duke, supplemented by an additional gift to purchase books, enabled the construction of a new library which opened in 1903. Following the creation of the Duke Endowment and the establishment of Duke University in 1924, a larger building (now the Lilly Library) was constructed on East Campus. Opening in 1927, it held the entire collection until the completion of the General Library in 1930 (renamed for William R. Perkins in 1966) on the new West Campus. The move to the General Library involved additional complexity as separate libraries were established for individual departments and schools including Biology, Chemistry, Divinity, Forestry, Law, and Medicine.

The rapid growth "from an insignificant college collection to one of the great national libraries of the country" continued throughout the 1930s and 1940s with a million books and over two million manuscripts and other documents in the collection, managed by a staff of 70, at the end of his tenure. At his retirement, it was noted that "In his achievements and the expansion of the library is reflected the growth of Duke University", and later that his "longevity served the university well".

Following his initial retirement in 1939, he transitioned to an advisory role as Librarian Emeritus. He returned to his librarian duties in 1943 during World War II until retiring again in 1946.

Breedlove was one of the founders of the North Carolina Library Association in 1904, serving as treasurer in 1910 and president for two terms from 1910 to 1913. He was also elected to the North Carolina Library Commission in 1921.

Notable former members of his library staff included Benjamin E. Powell, William Porter Kellam, Mortimer Taube, and Lawrence Quincy Mumford.

== Later life and legacy ==
Rubenstein Library portrait

He spent his later years as Librarian Emeritus performing assigned duties and working on a history of the Duke libraries. After he died at his home in 1955, a funeral service was held at the Duke University Chapel, followed by burial in Durham's Maplewood Cemetery.

After his death, two notable publications summarized his career:

Duke University Library Notes wrote,

Mr. Breedlove had an opportunity that comes to few men; he was among the pioneers of his profession and thus saw the work to which he had early devoted himself expand and flourish in a degree that was spectacular and unexpected.

The Durham Morning Herald added,

Under Breedlove's guidance, the library grew from a one-room collection of unclassified and ill-arranged books to one of the leading university libraries in the nation.

His book, Duke University Library, 1840-1910: A Brief Account With Reminiscences, was published in 1955, shortly after his death. A portrait by local artist Clement Read Strudwick, presented to the university in 1962 by Lucile Aiken Breedlove, hangs outside the Joseph Penn Breedlove Conference Room, dedicated in 1971, in the Rubenstein Rare Book & Manuscript Library.

The home he built in 1915 at 407 Watts Street in Durham's Trinity Historic District, a "restrained Neo-Classical design reminiscent of the more elaborate (former) Watts Hospital", was designated an historic site with a plaque from the Historic Preservation Society of Durham in 2006.

The Joseph P. Breedlove Papers, 1913-1950 (2000 items) are archived at the Rubenstein Library.

== Publications ==
Selected books and articles ordered by year:

- Breedlove, Joseph Penn (January 1898). "A Yankee Soldier's Diary". The Trinity Archive. Vol. XI. pp. 188–192.
- —————— (December 1902). "Diogenes Teufelsdroeckh". The Trinity Archive. Vol. XVI. pp. 117–126.
- —————— (June 1911). "Trinity College Library". North Carolina Library Bulletin. Vol. I. pp. 76–78.
- —————— (April 1916). "The Anne Roney Shakespeare Collection". The Trinity Archive. Vol. XXIX. pp. 195–297.
- —————— (September 1917). "Some Effects of the European War on College Libraries". North Carolina Library Bulletin. Vol. III. pp. 75–77.
- —————— (July 1918). "Trinity College Library". The Trinity Alumni Register. Vol. IV. pp. 95–97.
- —————— (March 1920). "Standardization, Service and Salary". North Carolina Library Bulletin. Vol. IV. pp. 62–67.
- —————— (July 1924). "The Library: Its History and Its Needs". Trinity Alumni Register. Vol. X. pp. 333–335, 337.
- —————— (September 1, 1931). "New Duke University Library Building". Library Journal. Vol. LVI. pp. 691–693.
- —————— (December 1934). "Interesting Data Regarding the Wiley Gray Medal". Duke Alumni Register. Vol. XX. pp. 335–338.
- —————— (1955). Duke University Library, 1840-1940: A Brief Account With Reminiscences. Durham: The Friends of Duke University Library.

== Personal life ==
His first marriage in 1905 to Bessie Wilson Bassett (1879–1912), sister of John Spencer Bassett, produced one daughter, Bessie Bassett (1912–1997). His second marriage in 1917 to Lucile Aiken (1885–1970) produced a daughter, Susan Caroline (1918–1995), and a son, Joseph Penn Jr. (1919–2005). A third child, John Hester (b. 1927), died in infancy.
