= Maurice Hart House =

Historic house in North Carolina, United States

- U.S. National Register of Historic Places
- U.S. Historic district
- Location within North Carolina Location within the United States
- Location: NC 1430, near Stovall, North Carolina
- Coordinates: 36°26′57″N 78°34′36″W
- Area: 2 acres (0.81 ha)
- Built: c. 1845
- Architectural style: Greek Revival
- MPS: Granville County MPS
- NRHP reference No.: 88000420
- Added to NRHP: April 28, 1988

Maurice Hart House, also known as Rock-a-way, is a historic plantation house and national historic district located near Stovall, Granville County, North Carolina. It was built about 1845, and is a two-story, three-bay, Greek Revival heavy timber frame dwelling. It has a low hipped roof, exterior brick end chimneys, and a late-19th century porch.

It was listed on the National Register of Historic Places in 1988.
