= James Blackwell House =

Historic house in North Carolina, United States

- U.S. National Register of Historic Places
- U.S. Historic district
- Location within North Carolina Location within the United States
- Location: NC 1411, near Cornwall, North Carolina
- Coordinates: 36°27′39″N 78°41′29″W
- Area: 12 acres (4.9 ha)
- Built: c. 1820
- Architectural style: Georgian, Federal
- MPS: Granville County MPS
- NRHP reference No.: 88000407
- Added to NRHP: April 28, 1988

The James Blackwell House is a historic house and national historic district located near Cornwall, Granville County, North Carolina.

== Description and history ==
It was built about 1820, and is a 1 1/2-story, Georgian/Federal style dwelling. It has a hall-and-parlor plan, rests on a stone foundation, and has double shouldered stone end chimneys.

It was listed on the National Register of Historic Places on April 28, 1988.
