= Hill Airy =

Historic house in North Carolina, United States

- U.S. National Register of Historic Places
- Location within North Carolina Location within the United States
- Location: S of Stovall, near Stovall, North Carolina
- Coordinates: 36°24′35″N 78°33′54″W
- Area: 30 acres (12 ha)
- Built: c. 1841
- Built by: Francis R. Gregory
- Architectural style: Greek Revival
- NRHP reference No.: 74001349
- Added to NRHP: October 29, 1974

Hill Airy is a historic plantation house located near Stovall, Granville County, North Carolina. It was built about 1841, and is a 1 1/2-story, five-bay, vernacular Greek Revival style frame dwelling. It has a central hall plan and exterior double shouldered end chimneys. It also has a large garden on the grounds in the shape of a Maltese cross.

It was listed on the National Register of Historic Places in 1974.
