= First National Bank Building (Creedmoor, North Carolina) =

Historic building in North Carolina, US

- U.S. National Register of Historic Places
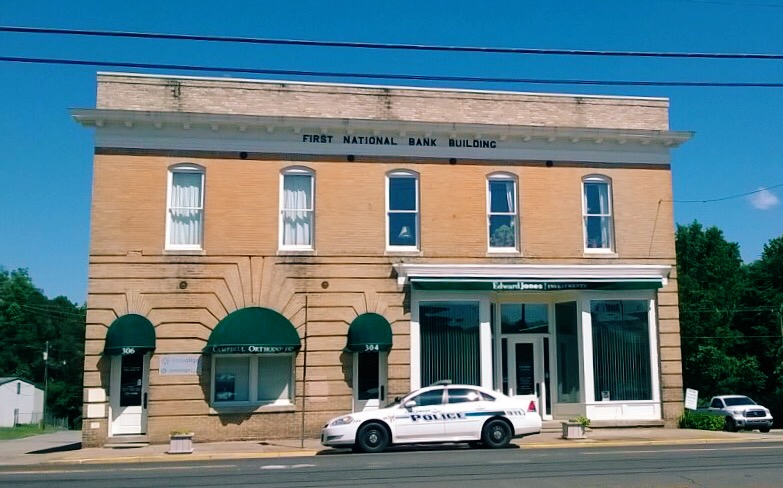

- Location within North Carolina Location within the United States
- Location: 302 Main St., Creedmoor, North Carolina
- Coordinates: 36°7′8″N 78°41′12″W
- Area: less than one acre
- Built: 1912
- Built by: Clegg, Robert
- Architectural style: Beaux Arts
- MPS: Granville County MPS
- NRHP reference No.: 88001254
- Added to NRHP: August 31, 1988

First National Bank Building is a historic bank building located at Creedmoor, Granville County, North Carolina. It was built in 1912, and is a two-story, Beaux Arts-style brick building. It features raised bands of brick cross the entire first floor front elevation, exploded in sunbursts over the three round-arched openings, and an ornate metal cornice. It housed a bank until 1977.

It was listed on the National Register of Historic Places in 1988.
