= Bobbitt–Rogers House and Tobacco Manufactory District =

Historic farm in North Carolina, United States

- U.S. National Register of Historic Places
- U.S. Historic district
- Nearest city: Wilton, North Carolina
- Area: 9 acres (3.6 ha)
- Built: c. 1855
- Architectural style: Greek Revival
- MPS: Granville County MPS
- NRHP reference No.: 88001262
- Added to NRHP: August 31, 1988

Bobbitt–Rogers House and Tobacco Manufactory District is a historic plantation house and national historic district located near Wilton, Granville County, North Carolina. The house was built about 1855, and is a two-story, three-bay, center hall plan Greek Revival style frame I-house dwelling. It has a full basement, full-width front porch, and exterior brick chimneys. Across from the house is the 2 1/2-story heavy timber frame tobacco manufactory. Also on the property are the contributing wash house / striphouse, open wellhouse, smokehouse, privy, and flower house / chicken house.

It was listed on the National Register of Historic Places in 1988.

Images of home
