= Oxford Historic District (Oxford, North Carolina) =

Historic district in North Carolina, United States

- U.S. National Register of Historic Places
- U.S. Historic district
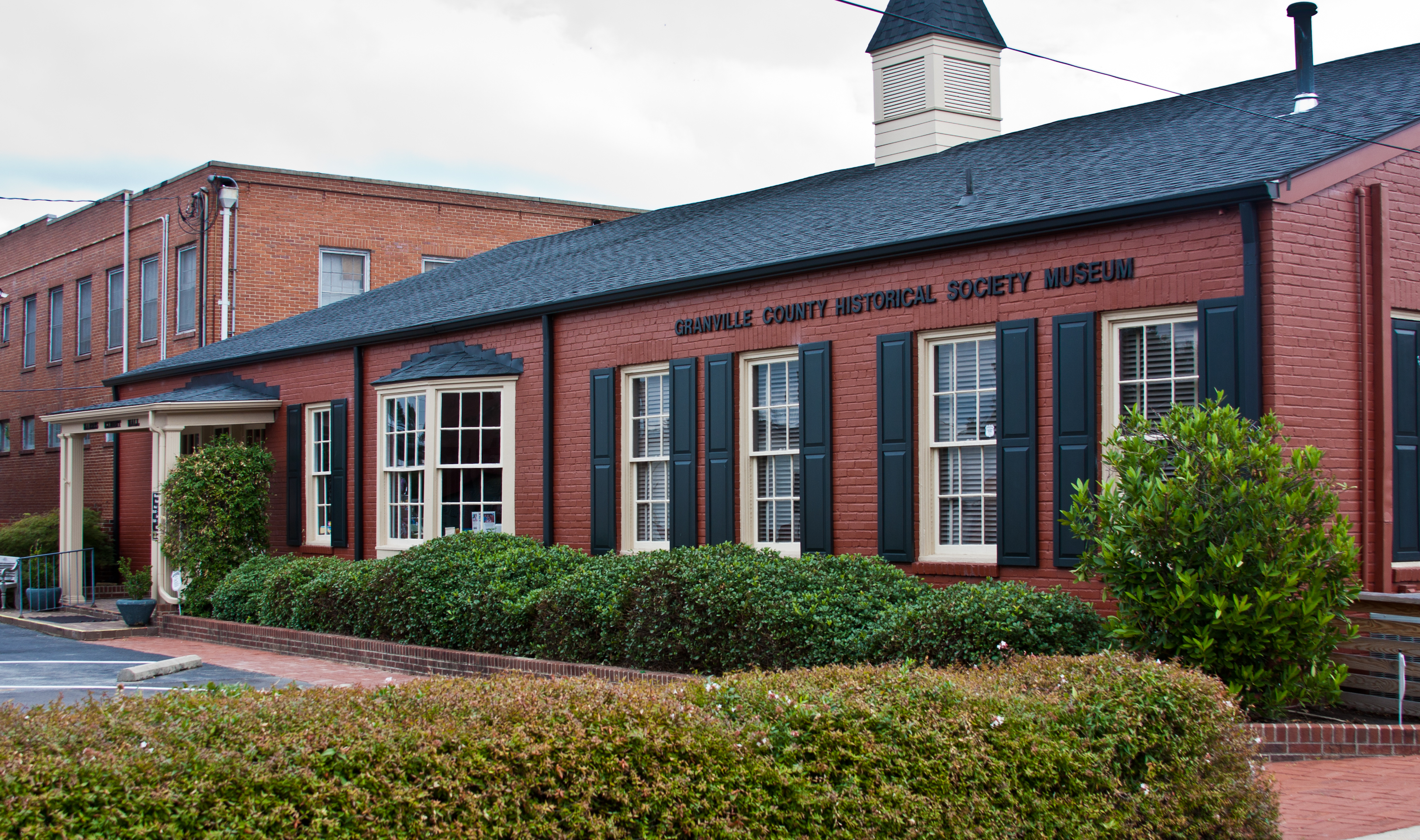
- Granville County Historical Museum, September 2012

- Location within North Carolina Location within the United States
- Location: Roughly bounded by College, New College and Gilliam and Raleigh, Front, Broad and Goshen and Hayes Sts.; also roughly bounded by Alexander and Sunset Aves., 3rd, Belle, Broad, Cherry, College, Devin, Franklin, Front, Gilliam, Granville, Henderson, Hillsboro, Lanier, Main, New College, Raleigh, and West Sts., and Martin Luther King Jr. Blvd., Oxford, North Carolina
- Coordinates: 36°18′41″N 78°35′25″W
- Area: 126 acres (51 ha)
- Built: 1838
- Architect: Bain, W.C.; Et al.
- Architectural style: Late 19th And 20th Century Revivals, Greek Revival, Late Victorian
- MPS: Granville County MPS
- NRHP reference No.: 88000403 (original); 100005974 (increase)

Significant dates
- Added to NRHP: April 28, 1988
- Boundary increase: December 21, 2020

Oxford Historic District is a national historic district located at Oxford, Granville County, North Carolina. The district encompasses 201 contributing buildings, 1 contributing site, and 2 contributing objects in the central business district and surrounding residential sections of Oxford. It includes buildings dating from the early-19th century through the 1930s and notable examples of Greek Revival and Late Victorian style architecture. Located in the district is the separately listed Granville County Courthouse (1838-1840). Other notable buildings include the Bryant-Kingsbury House (c. 1825), Taylor-McClanahan-Smith House (1820s), former Granville County Jail (Granville County Museum, 1858), Oxford Women's Club (c. 1850), Titus Grandy House (1850s), Oxford Presbyterian Church (c. 1830), St. John's College, Lyon-Winston Building (1911), Herndon Block Number 2 (c. 1887), Hunt Building (c. 1887), L. H. Currin-American Tobacco Company (1860s), and St. Stephens Episcopal Church (1902).

It was listed on the National Register of Historic Places in 1988, with a boundary revision in 2020.
