= Elijah Sherman Farm =

Historic farm in North Carolina, United States

- U.S. National Register of Historic Places
- U.S. Historic district
- Location within North Carolina Location within the United States
- Location: US 158, near Berea, North Carolina
- Coordinates: 36°19′46″N 78°46′47″W
- Area: 25 acres (10 ha)
- Built: 1887
- Architectural style: I-house
- MPS: Granville County MPS
- NRHP reference No.: 88001256
- Added to NRHP: August 31, 1988

Elijah Sherman Farm is a historic tobacco farm complex and national historic district located near Berea, Granville County, North Carolina. The farmhouse was built about 1887, and is a two-story, three-bay, frame I-house, with a one-story full facade porch. Also on the property are two log corn cribs, stone well, two garage/sheds, a privy, smokehouse, woodhouse, corn crib, washhouse, stable, packhouse, striphouse, four tobacco barns, and a family cemetery.

It was listed on the National Register of Historic Places in 1988.
