= Cannady–Brogden Farm =

Historic farm in North Carolina, United States

- U.S. National Register of Historic Places
- Location within North Carolina Location within the United States
- Location: 15260 Brogden Rd., near Creedmoor, North Carolina
- Coordinates: 36°03′55″N 78°41′09″W
- Area: 25 acres (10 ha)
- Built: 1904
- Architect: Edgar Gooch
- Architectural style: Queen Anne
- NRHP reference No.: 01000424
- Added to NRHP: April 25, 2001

The Cannady–Brogden Farm is a historic home and farm located near Creedmoor, Wake County, North Carolina. Built in 1904, the house is an example of a Queen Anne style, triple-A-roofed, I-shaped building. In addition to the house, other structures on the farm include: a corn crib, a woodshed, a washhouse, a covered well, a chicken coop, a smokehouse, a stackhouse, a packhouse, a machinery shed, a mule barn, a cow shed, and a tobacco barn.

In April 2001, the Cannady–Brogden Farm was listed on the National Register of Historic Places.

== See also ==
- List of Registered Historic Places in North Carolina
