= Oaklawn Plantation =

Oaklawn Plantation may refer to:

- Oaklawn (Huntsville, Alabama), listed on the National Register of Historic Places (NRHP)
- Oaklawn Plantation (Leon County, Florida)
- Oaklawn Plantation (Natchitoches, Louisiana), listed on the NRHP
- Oaklawn Manor (Franklin, Louisiana), listed on the NRHP

== See also ==
- Oaklawn (disambiguation)
