= Puckett Family Farm =

Historic farm in North Carolina, United States

- U.S. National Register of Historic Places
- U.S. Historic district
- Location within North Carolina Location within the United States
- Location: NC 1333, near Satterwhite, North Carolina
- Coordinates: 36°22′02″N 78°40′09″W
- Area: 4.5 acres (1.8 ha)
- Built: 1899
- Architectural style: I-house
- MPS: Granville County MPS
- NRHP reference No.: 88000423
- Added to NRHP: April 28, 1988

Puckett Family Farm is a historic tobacco farm complex and national historic district located near Satterwhite, Granville County, North Carolina. The farmhouse was built about 1899, and is a two-story, three-bay, I-house dwelling rear kitchen ell. Also on the property are the contributing packhouse, striphouse, four log barns, garage, smokehouse, well, brooder house, corn crib, stable, and privy.

It was listed on the National Register of Historic Places in 1988.
