= Elmwood (Lewis, North Carolina) =

Historic house in North Carolina, United States

- U.S. National Register of Historic Places
- U.S. Historic district
- Nearest city: Lewis, North Carolina
- Area: 8 acres (3.2 ha)
- Built: 1805
- Built by: Ragsdale, Peter H.
- Architectural style: Georgian
- MPS: Granville County MPS
- NRHP reference No.: 88000406
- Added to NRHP: April 28, 1988

Elmwood is a historic plantation and national historic district located near Lewis, Granville County, North Carolina. The plantation house was built in 1805, and is a two-story, three bay Georgian style heavy timber frame dwelling. It has a gable roof and double-shouldered exterior end chimneys.

It was listed on the National Register of Historic Places in 1988.
