= Abrams Plains =

Historic house in North Carolina, United States

- U.S. National Register of Historic Places
- Location within North Carolina Location within the United States
- Location: NW of Stovall, near Stovall, North Carolina
- Coordinates: 36°28′58″N 78°30′51″W
- Area: 40 acres (16 ha)
- Built: 1766, c. 1830
- Built by: Samuel Smith
- Architectural style: Greek Revival, Federal
- NRHP reference No.: 79001711
- Added to NRHP: November 29, 1979

Abrams Plains is a historic plantation house located near Stovall, Granville County, North Carolina. The house was built by the forced labor of enslaved people to be the main living quarters of an agricultural estate owned by Samuel Smith, a prominent member of the Granville Count community before, during, and after the Revolutionary War.

Named for a battle of the French and Indian Wars, the house consists of parts of a dwelling built about 1766, connected to transitional Federal / Greek Revival style house built in 1830. The main section is a two-story, three-bay by two bay, central hall plan frame dwelling. The 1766 sections are 1 1/2 stories and extend from the main house in a "C"-shape. The Abrams Plains plantation also contains a family graveyard for the Smith family which goes back to the original owner of the plantation, Samuel Smith, as well as the graves of enslaved people who worked the plantation.

It was listed on the National Register of Historic Places in 1979.
