= Joseph P. Hunt Farm =

Historic farm in North Carolina, United States

- U.S. National Register of Historic Places
- U.S. Historic district
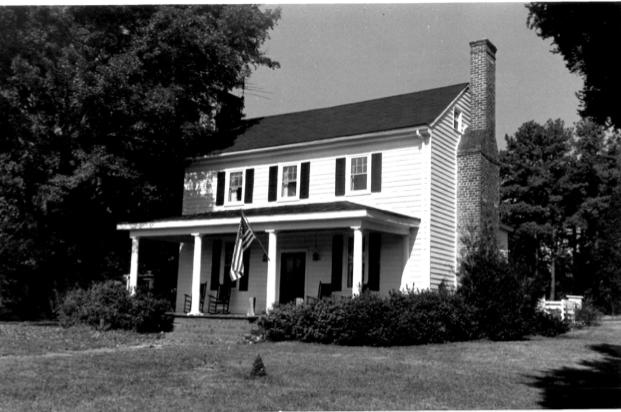
- Farmhouse in 1987

- Location within North Carolina Location within the United States
- Location: 4067 Chewning Rd (NC 1514), near Dexter, North Carolina
- Coordinates: 36°23′07″N 78°32′48″W
- Area: 81 acres (33 ha)
- Built: c. 1844
- Built by: Joseph Penn Hunt; Martha Crews Hunt
- Architectural style: Greek Revival
- MPS: Granville County MPS
- NRHP reference No.: 88001265
- Added to NRHP: August 31, 1988

The Joseph P. Hunt Farm is an historic tobacco farm complex and national historic district located near Dexter, Granville County, North Carolina. Built about 1844 by Joseph Penn Hunt and Martha Michum Crews Hunt, the farmhouse is a two-story, three-bay, Greek Revival style dwelling. It has a two-story rear ell dated to the 1870s and a full-width front porch added in the 1920s. Also on the property are the contributing small frame outbuilding, potato house, corn crib, two tobacco barns, smokehouse, large horse barn, packhouse, and combination icehouse/carriage house. Representative of rural life during the brightleaf era, the farm was also the site of Breedlove Mill.

Upon Hunt's death in 1880, the farm passed to his daughter Susan Caroline Hunt Breedlove and her husband John Henry Breedlove. Son Laurie Garner Breedlove and daughter-in-law Rebecca Mason Rice Breedlove were the next owners, followed by their daughters Evelyn Caroline Breedlove and Mildred Laurie Breedlove. The farm remained in the family until 1970.

The site, now known as Goose River Farm, was listed on the National Register of Historic Places in 1988.

== See also ==
- National Register of Historic Places listings in Granville County, North Carolina
- Joseph Penn Breedlove
