= John P. Lawrence Plantation =

Historic house in North Carolina, United States

- U.S. National Register of Historic Places
- U.S. Historic district
- Location within North Carolina Location within the United States
- Location: NC 1700, near Grissom, North Carolina
- Coordinates: 36°06′56″N 78°35′31″W
- Area: 8.5 acres (3.4 ha)
- Built: c. 1845
- Architectural style: Greek Revival
- MPS: Granville County MPS
- NRHP reference No.: 88001264
- Added to NRHP: August 31, 1988

John P. Lawrence Plantation is a historic tobacco plantation house and national historic district located near Grissom, Granville County, North Carolina. The house was built about 1845, and is a two-story, three-bay, "T"-plan, heavy timber frame Greek Revival style dwelling. It has a low hipped roof, brick-walled basement, and one-story front porch with a hipped roof. Also on the property are the contributing smokehouse, kitchen, schoolhouse, corn crib, and gambrel roofed stable.

It was listed on the National Register of Historic Places in 1988.
