= Cozart-Coley House =

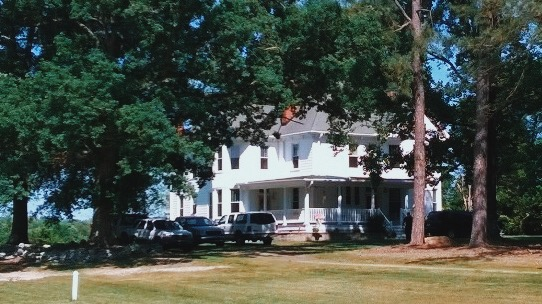
- View of the house from the front yard

General information
- Type: residence
- Architectural style: Victorian
- Town or city: Stem, North Carolina
- Country: United States
- Coordinates: 36.19623°N 78.71937°W
- Named for: Cozart & Coley families
- Groundbreaking: 1901

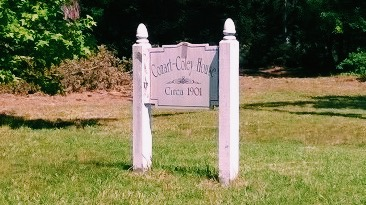
Sign in the front yard of the Cozart-Coley House.

Cozart-Coley House is a historic Victorian house located in downtown Stem, North Carolina. The house was constructed in 1901 by Sheriff Cozart of Stem and later owned by a local business owner and member of the Coley family. The house is 3,826 square feet, two stories and has four bedrooms and three bathrooms, a fruit cellar, and servants quarters. It sits on 1.5 acres.
