= Providence, Granville County, North Carolina =

Providence, North Carolina
- Unincorporated community
- Location within North Carolina Location within the United States
- Coordinates: 36°15′16″N 78°39′42″W
- Country: United States
- State: North Carolina
- County: Granville
- Elevation: 440 ft (130 m)
- Time zone: UTC-5 (Eastern (EST))
  - Summer (DST): UTC-4 (EDT)
- Area code: 919
- GNIS feature ID: 1022093

Providence is an unincorporated community in Granville County, North Carolina, United States. Providence is 5.5 miles (8.9 km) southwest of Oxford.
