= John Mask Peace House =

Historic house in North Carolina, United States

- U.S. National Register of Historic Places
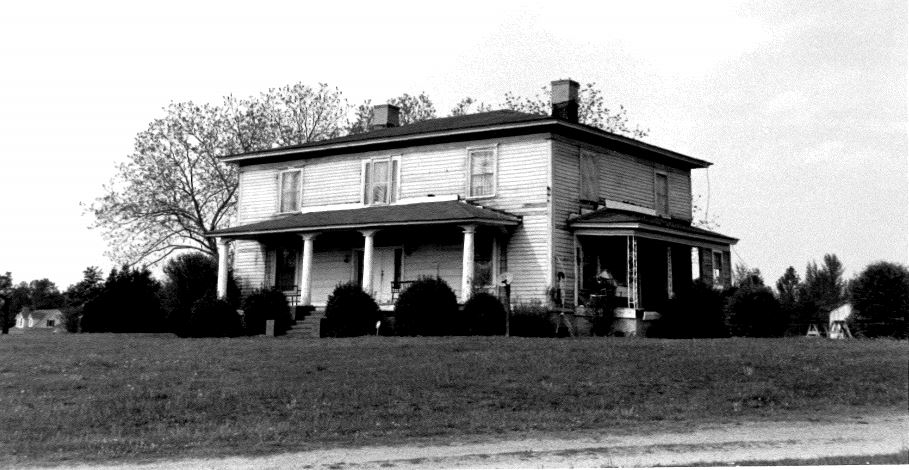

- Location within North Carolina Location within the United States
- Location: NC 1613, approx. 0.5 miles SE of jct. with NC 1615 at Peace's Chapel, near Fairport, North Carolina
- Coordinates: 36°13′15″N 78°30′41″W
- Area: 5 acres (2.0 ha)
- Built: c. 1840
- Architectural style: Greek Revival
- NRHP reference No.: 03000301
- Added to NRHP: April 22, 2003

John Mask Peace House, also known as Bambro Plantation, is a historic plantation house located near Fairport, Granville County, North Carolina. The house was built about 1840, and is a two-story, three-bay, double-pile, frame building with a low, hipped roof. It has central hall plan and Greek Revival style design elements.

It was listed on the National Register of Historic Places in 2003.
