= Mount Energy Historic District =

Historic district in North Carolina, United States

- U.S. National Register of Historic Places
- U.S. Historic district
- Location within North Carolina Location within the United States
- Location: NC 1636 and NC 56, Mount Energy, North Carolina
- Coordinates: 36°07′31″N 78°38′32″W
- Area: 1.5 acres (0.61 ha)
- Built: 1845
- Architectural style: Greek Revival, early 20th-century commercial
- MPS: Granville County MPS
- NRHP reference No.: 88001266
- Added to NRHP: August 31, 1988

Mount Energy Historic District is a national historic district located at Mount Energy, Granville County, North Carolina. The district encompasses six contributing buildings in the crossroads community of Mount Energy. They are a Greek Revival style store and Masonic Lodge dated to about 1845, a store from the 1920s, and three sheds.

It was listed on the National Register of Historic Places in 1988.
