= John W. Stovall Farm =

Historic farm in North Carolina, United States

- U.S. National Register of Historic Places
- U.S. Historic district
- Location within North Carolina Location within the United States
- Location: NC 1507, near Stovall, North Carolina
- Coordinates: 36°27′22″N 78°33′23″W
- Area: 54 acres (22 ha)
- Built: c. 1835, c. 1855-1860
- Architectural style: Greek Revival, Federal
- MPS: Granville County MPS
- NRHP reference No.: 88001270
- Added to NRHP: August 31, 1988

John W. Stovall Farm is a historic tobacco farm complex and national historic district located near Stovall, Granville County, North Carolina. The farmhouse was built in two sections, about 1835 and about 1855–1860. The older half is a two-story, three-bay, heavy timber frame dwelling. The newer 1 1/2-story half has a mix of Federal and Greek Revival style decorative elements. Also on the property are the contributing corn crib, stable, smokehouse later used as a striphouse, lumber house, and a family cemetery.

It was listed on the National Register of Historic Places in 1988.
