= Allen-Mangum House =

Historic house in North Carolina, United States

- U.S. National Register of Historic Places
- U.S. Historic district
- Location within North Carolina Location within the United States
- Location: NC 1700, near Grissom, North Carolina
- Coordinates: 36°6′20″N 78°37′2″W
- Area: 3.5 acres (1.4 ha)
- Built: 1848, c. 1880
- Architectural style: Greek Revival, Italianate, Gothic Revival
- MPS: Granville County MPS
- NRHP reference No.: 88000410
- Added to NRHP: April 28, 1988

Allen-Mangum House is a historic plantation house and national historic district located near Grissom, Granville County, North Carolina.

Built as the main residence of a plantation, the house includes a rear block was built about 1848 and a front block added about 1880. It is a two-story frame dwelling with Greek Revival, Gothic Revival, and Italianate style design elements. It has an I-house form and a two-story rear ell. It features a front porch with an exceptionally intricate, cutout screen of woodwork draped between the tops of square bracketed posts. Also on the property is the contributing family cemetery.

It was listed on the National Register of Historic Places in 1988.
