= James W. Freeman House =

Historic house in North Carolina, United States

- U.S. National Register of Historic Places
- U.S. Historic district
- Location within North Carolina Location within the United States
- Location: NC 1623, near Wilton, North Carolina
- Coordinates: 36°10′18″N 78°33′19″W
- Area: 32 acres (13 ha)
- Built: c. 1820
- Architectural style: Georgian, Federal
- MPS: Granville County MPS
- NRHP reference No.: 88000411
- Added to NRHP: April 28, 1988

James W. Freeman House is a historic home and national historic district located near Wilton, Granville County, North Carolina. It was built about 1820, and is a 1 1/2-story, three-bay, heavy timber frame dwelling with Georgian / Federal style design elements. It has a steeply pitched roof and an exterior brick end chimney.

It was listed on the National Register of Historic Places in 1988.
