= Oaklawn Cemetery (disambiguation) =

Oaklawn Cemetery is the first public burial ground in Tampa, Florida. Oaklawn Cemetery may also refer to:

- Oaklawn Cemetery (Tulsa), oldest existing cemetery in Tulsa, Oklahoma
- Oak Lawn Cemetery, in Fairfield, Connecticut, established 1865

== See also ==
- Oaklawn (disambiguation)
