= Grissom, North Carolina =

Unincorporated community in North Carolina, US

Coordinates: 36°04′20″N 78°35′47″W

Grissom is an unincorporated community in southern Granville County, North Carolina, United States. It is located at the intersection of roads 1710 and 1713, south of Wilton.

The Allen-Mangum House and John P. Lawrence Plantation were listed on the National Register of Historic Places in 1988.
