= Oliver–Morton Farm =

Historic farm in North Carolina, United States

- U.S. National Register of Historic Places
- U.S. Historic district
- Location within North Carolina Location within the United States
- Location: NC 1417, near Oak Hill, North Carolina
- Coordinates: 36°25′38″N 78°40′51″W
- Area: 22 acres (8.9 ha)
- Built: c. 1800, c. 1890
- Architectural style: Italianate, Georgian, I-house
- MPS: Granville County MPS
- NRHP reference No.: 88001269
- Added to NRHP: August 31, 1988

Oliver–Morton Farm is a historic tobacco farm complex and national historic district located near Oak Hill, Granville County, North Carolina. The Samuel V. Morton farmhouse was built about 1890, and is a two-story, three-bay, Italianate style I-house dwelling. It has a one-story rear ell. The Oliver House dates to about 1800, and is a 1 1/2-story brick-nogged heavy timber frame building. It is one of Granville County's oldest buildings, and was converted to a packhouse in the early 20th century. Also on the property are the contributing potato house, two sheds, striphouse, and corn crib.

It was listed on the National Register of Historic Places in 1988.
