= Oak Lawn (Huntsboro, North Carolina) =

Historic house in North Carolina, United States

- U.S. National Register of Historic Places
- U.S. Historic district
- Nearest city: Huntsboro, North Carolina
- Area: 55 acres (22 ha)
- Built: c. 1820
- Architectural style: Greek Revival, Georgian, Federal
- MPS: Granville County MPS
- NRHP reference No.: 88000408
- Added to NRHP: April 28, 1988

Oak Lawn is a historic plantation house and national historic district located near Huntsboro, Granville County, North Carolina. The plantation house was built about 1820, and is a two-story, five-bay, transitional Federal / Georgian / Greek Revival style heavy timber frame dwelling. Also on the property are the contributing one-room former dwelling, smokehouse, barn, office, two-room kitchen, a small mortise and tenon barn and attached shed, a long frame packhouse, frame chicken barn, frame corn crib, and frame packhouse.

It was listed on the National Register of Historic Places in 1988.
