= Wilbourns, North Carolina =

- Unincorporated community
- Location within North Carolina Location within the United States
- Country: United States
- State: North Carolina
- County: Granville
- Elevation: 495 ft (151 m)
- Time zone: UTC-5 (Eastern (EST))
  - Summer (DST): UTC-4 (EDT)
- GNIS feature ID: 1023239

Wilbourns is an unincorporated community in the Oak Hill Township, Granville County, North Carolina, United States. It is also home to the Marcus Royster Plantation which was listed on the National Register of Historic Places in 1988.
