= Oliver House (Wakefield, Massachusetts) =

Historic house in Massachusetts, United States

- U.S. National Register of Historic Places
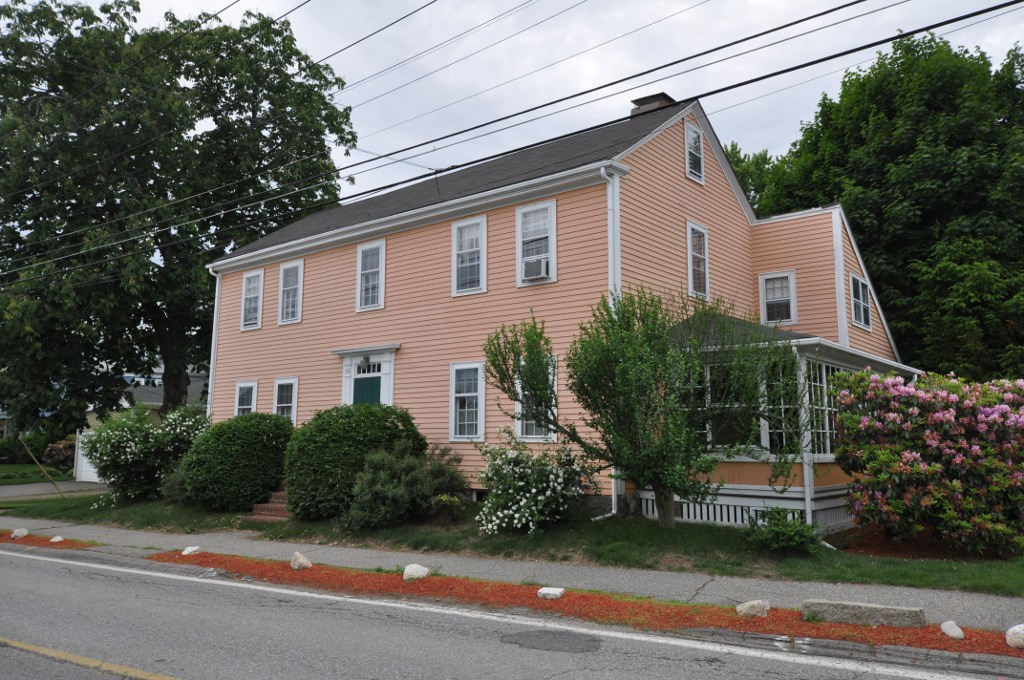
- The house in 2014; the Beverly jog is visible on its right side

- Location within Massachusetts Location within the United States
- Location: 58 Oak St., Wakefield, Massachusetts
- Coordinates: 42.486126°N 71.062286°W
- Area: less than one acre
- Built: 1790
- Architectural style: Federal
- NRHP reference No.: 14000157
- Added to NRHP: April 15, 2014

The Oliver House, also known as the Smith-Oliver House, is a historic house at 58 Oak Street in Wakefield, Massachusetts. Probably built in the late 18th century, this Federal period house is distinctive for its association with the now-suburban area's agrarian past, and as a two-family residence of the period, with two "Beverly jogs". The house was listed on the National Register of Historic Places in 2014.

== Description and history ==
The Oliver House is located at the northwest corner of Oak Street and Crosby Road in the Greenwood section of southern Wakefield. It is a 2 1/2-story wood-frame structure, five bays wide, with a side-gable roof and clapboard siding. The entrance, at the center of the south-facing facade, is flanked by fluted pilasters, and is topped by a transom window and projecting lintel. The rear of the house has several additions built under a roof that slopes down to the first floor, giving the house a saltbox profile. The outer additions extend beyond the sides of the main block, a local example of a "Beverly jog". These additions each added a kitchen to the building. The interior of the house has well-preserved Federal period woodwork.

Long thought to have been built in the mid-18th century, stylistic analysis suggests that it was more likely built in the late 18th century. It is built on land that was first settled in the 17th century by the Smith family. In the late 18th century, the property went through a rapid succession of owners, and it may be that this house was built by William Williams, not long after his marriage and purchase of the property in 1797. Williams died in 1813, leaving his wife and eight minor children. It is thought that additions to make multi-family living in the house possible date to after that time. The house was sold in 1814 to Ezekiel Oliver in 1814, the widow retaining a share of the house. The house would be used by multiple families, or extended families, or families with boarders, for more than 150 years.

== See also ==
- National Register of Historic Places listings in Wakefield, Massachusetts
- National Register of Historic Places listings in Middlesex County, Massachusetts
