= Lewis, North Carolina =

Unincorporated community in North Carolina, US

Coordinates: 36°22′34″N 78°35′41″W

Lewis is an unincorporated community in central Granville County, North Carolina, United States. It lies north of Oxford.

Elmwood was listed on the National Register of Historic Places in 1988.
