= Rufus Amis House and Mill =

Historic farm in North Carolina, United States

- U.S. National Register of Historic Places
- U.S. Historic district
- Nearest city: Virgilina, Virginia
- Area: 32.7 acres (13.2 ha)
- Built: c. 1855
- Architectural style: Greek Revival, Gothic Revival
- MPS: Granville County MPS
- NRHP reference No.: 88000416
- Added to NRHP: April 28, 1988

Rufus Amis House and Mill is a historic home and grist mill and national historic district located near Virgilina, Virginia in Granville County, North Carolina. The house was built about 1855, and is a 1 1/2-story, L-shaped Gothic Revival / Greek Revival style frame dwelling. It has a roof with six gables and delicately sawn bargeboards. Also on the property are the contributing smokehouse, icehouse (later a striphouse), privy, barn, chicken house, corn crib, mill race, former dwelling, and 3 1/2-story grist mill.

It was listed on the National Register of Historic Places in 1988.

Rufus Amis served in the North Carolina House of Representatives in 1879 and 1889 representing Granville County.
