= Granville County Courthouse =

Historic courthouse in North Carolina, US

- U.S. National Register of Historic Places
- U.S. Historic district – Contributing property
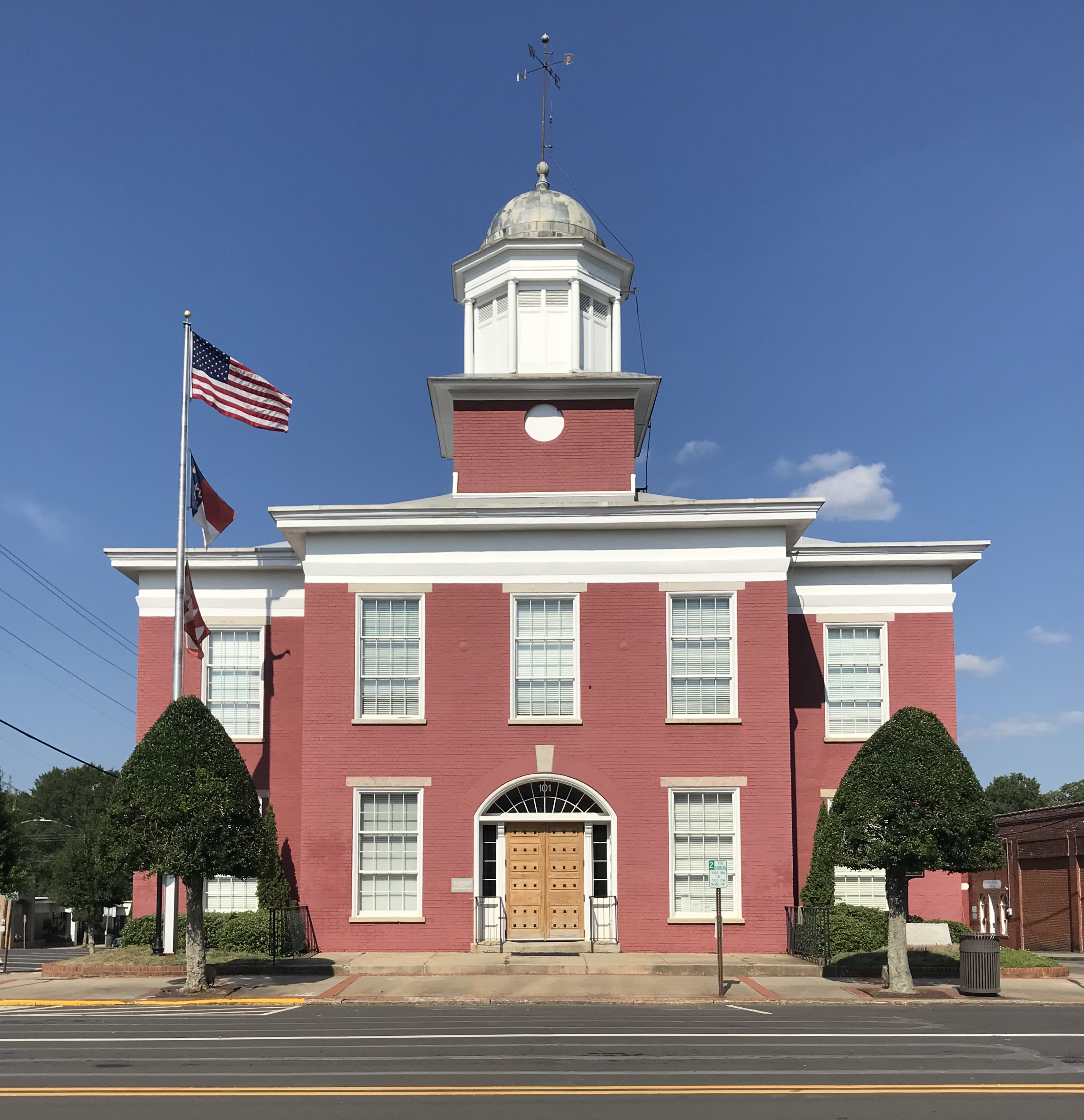
- Granville County Courthouse, August 2023

- Location within North Carolina Location within the United States
- Location: Main and Williamsboro Sts., Oxford, North Carolina
- Coordinates: 36°18′42″N 78°35′15″W
- Area: less than one acre
- Built: 1838
- Architectural style: Greek Revival
- MPS: North Carolina County Courthouses TR
- NRHP reference No.: 79001710
- Added to NRHP: May 10, 1979

Granville County Courthouse is a historic courthouse building located at Oxford, Granville County, North Carolina. It was built in 1838, and is a two-story, H-shaped, Greek Revival-style brick building. It has a three-bay central pavilion and a polygonal cupola with a domed room.

It was listed on the National Register of Historic Places in 1979. It is located in the Oxford Historic District.
