= Oxford Tobacco Research Station =

Agricultural research centre focused on tobacco in North Carolina, USA

The Oxford Tobacco Research Station is a government agency conducting research on flue-cured tobacco and other crops. It is located in Oxford, North Carolina and has existed since 1911. Superintendents since 1911 have been Moss, Carr, Ayscue, Campbell, Clements, Priest and Smith. Much has been accomplished related to disease resistance and tobacco curing. Forestry, wildlife habitat and water quality studies were started during the 80's.
