= Stovall, North Carolina =

- Town
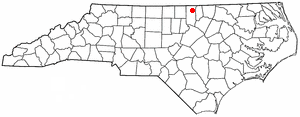
- Location of Stovall, North Carolina
- Coordinates: 36°26′51″N 78°34′08″W
- Country: United States
- State: North Carolina
- County: Granville
- Incorporated: 1883
- Named for: John W. Stovall

Area
  - Total: 1.05 sq mi (2.71 km^{2})
  - Land: 1.05 sq mi (2.71 km^{2})
  - Water: 0 sq mi (0.00 km^{2})
- Elevation: 476 ft (145 m)

Population (2020)
  - Total: 324
  - Density: 309.6/sq mi (119.53/km^{2})
- Time zone: UTC-5 (Eastern (EST))
  - Summer (DST): UTC-4 (EDT)
- ZIP code: 27582
- Area code: 919
- FIPS code: 37-65320
- GNIS feature ID: 2406673
- Website: https://www.stovallnc.org/

Stovall is a town in Granville County, North Carolina, United States. As of the 2020 census, Stovall had a population of 324.

== History ==
Abrams Plains, Maurice Hart House, Hill Airy and John W. Stovall Farm are listed on the National Register of Historic Places.

John Penn, one of the original signatories of the United States Declaration of Independence, lived just two miles east of Stovall. His estate and former grave site are now maintained by the DAR.

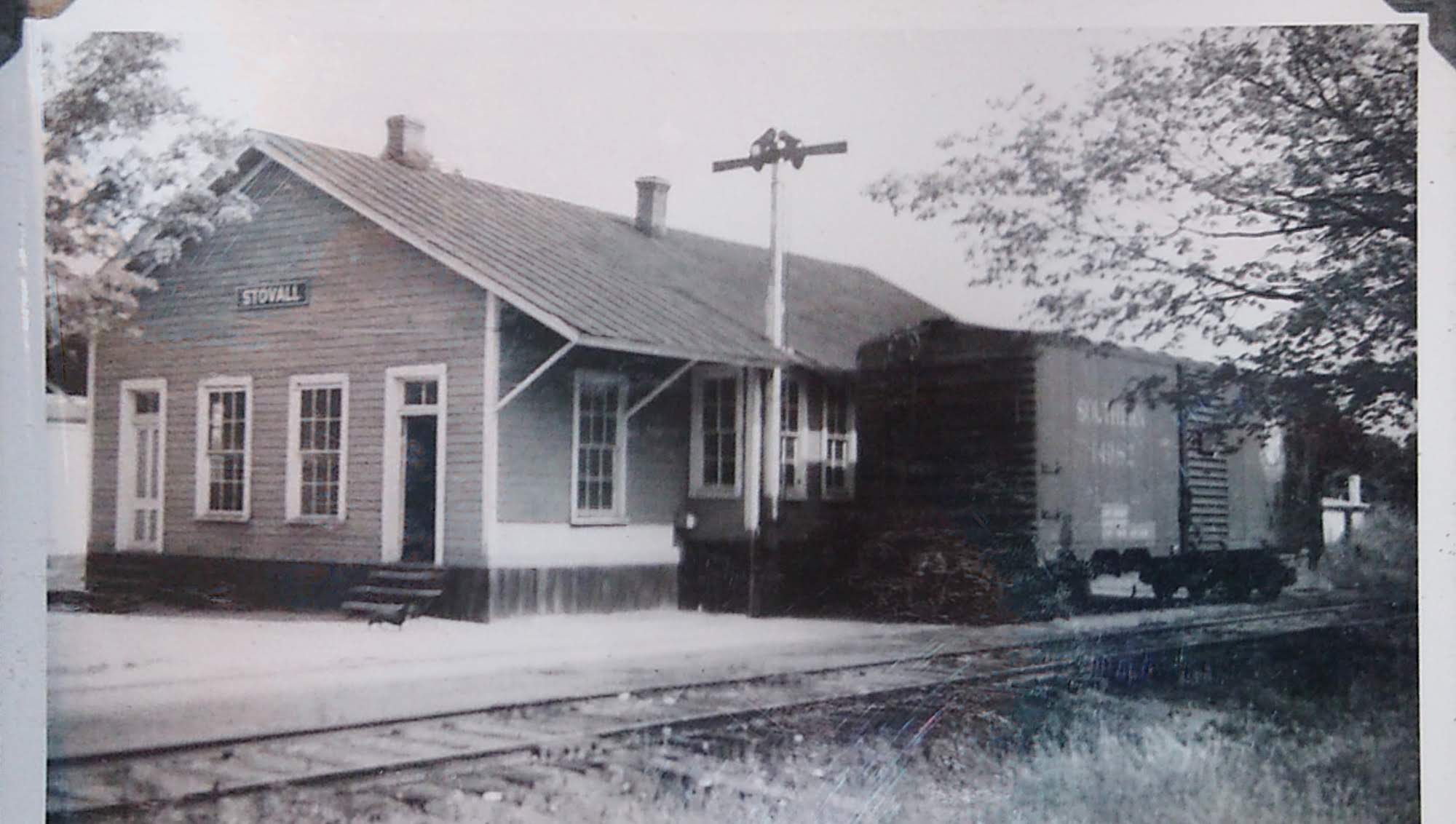
Stovall's Railroad Station

== Geography ==
According to the United States Census Bureau, the town has a total area of 1.0 square mile (2.6 km^{2}): all land.

Stovall is located in the Sassafras Fork voting precinct in Granville County.

== Demographics ==
Historical population
| Census | Pop. | Note | %± |
|---|---|---|---|
| 1910 | 305 | | — |
| 1920 | 414 | | 35.7% |
| 1930 | 415 | | 0.2% |
| 1940 | 415 | | 0.0% |
| 1950 | 410 | | −1.2% |
| 1960 | 570 | | 39.0% |
| 1970 | 405 | | −28.9% |
| 1980 | 417 | | 3.0% |
| 1990 | 409 | | −1.9% |
| 2000 | 376 | | −8.1% |
| 2010 | 418 | | 11.2% |
| 2020 | 324 | | −22.5% |
U.S. Decennial Census

As of the 2010 census, there were 418 people and 170 households. The population density was 418.0 inhabitants per square mile (161.4/km^{2}). There were 191 housing units at an average density of 191.0 per square mile (73.7/km^{2}). The racial makeup of the town was 54.5% White, 41.4% African American, 4.1% from other races. Hispanic or Latino of any race were 3.8% of the population.

There were 170 households, out of which 25.3% had children under the age of 18 living with them. In the town, the population was spread out, with 24.6% under the age of 18, 9.1% from 18 to 24, 9.3% from 25 to 34, 18.7% from 35 to 49, 18.7% from 50 to 64, and 19.6% who were 65 years of age or older. For every 100 females, there were 96.2 males.

The median income for a household in the town was $35,313, and the mean income for a household was $46,795. The median and mean family incomes were $55,938 and $68,693, respectively. The per capita income for the town was $24,117. About 6.9% of families and 10.9% of the population were below the poverty line, including 12.5% of those under age 18 and 11.3% of those age 65 or over.
