= Wilton, North Carolina =

Unincorporated community in North Carolina, US

Coordinates: 36°08′32″N 78°34′36″W

Wilton, NC

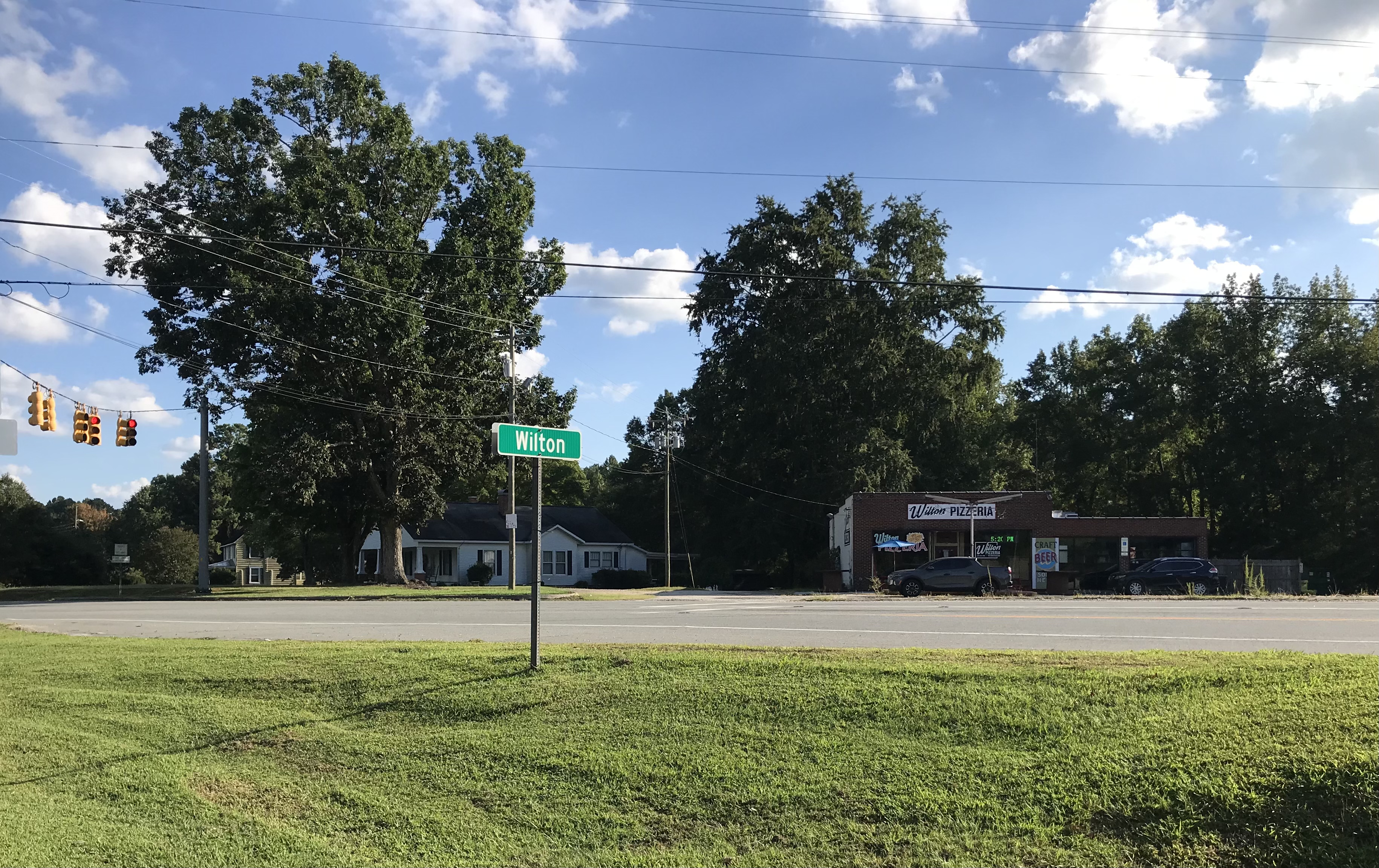
Wilton, North Carolina

Wilton is an unincorporated community in southern Granville County, North Carolina, United States. It lies north of Grissom and is the former home of Wilton High School. The main intersection at the corner of NC Hwy 56 & NC Hwy 96 is the home of Adriano's Pizzeria, Wilton Grill, Dollar General and 76 Gas Station.

== National Register of Historic Places ==
- Brassfield Baptist Church
- Bobbitt-Rogers House and Tobacco Manufactory District
- James W. Freeman House
- Harris-Currin House
- John Peace Jr. House
