= Bullock, North Carolina =

- Unincorporated community
- Location within North Carolina Location within the United States
- Coordinates: 36°29′29″N 78°32′42″W
- Country: United States
- State: North Carolina
- County: Granville
- Elevation: 427 ft (130 m)
- Time zone: UTC-5 (Eastern (EST))
  - Summer (DST): UTC-4 (EDT)
- ZIP code: 27507
- Area code: 919
- GNIS feature ID: 1023862

Bullock is an unincorporated community in Granville County, North Carolina, United States. The community is located on U.S. Route 15 3.3 miles (5.3 km) north-northeast of Stovall and 12.7 miles (20.4 km) north-northeast of Oxford. Bullock has a post office with ZIP code 27507.
