= Stem, North Carolina =

- Town
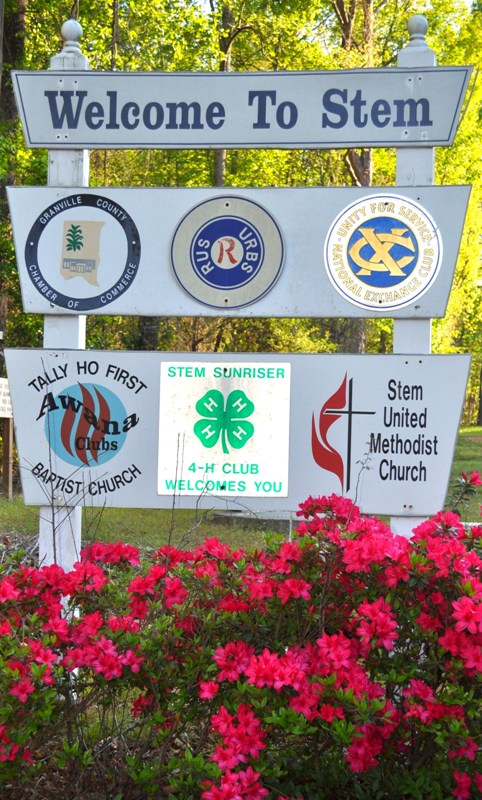

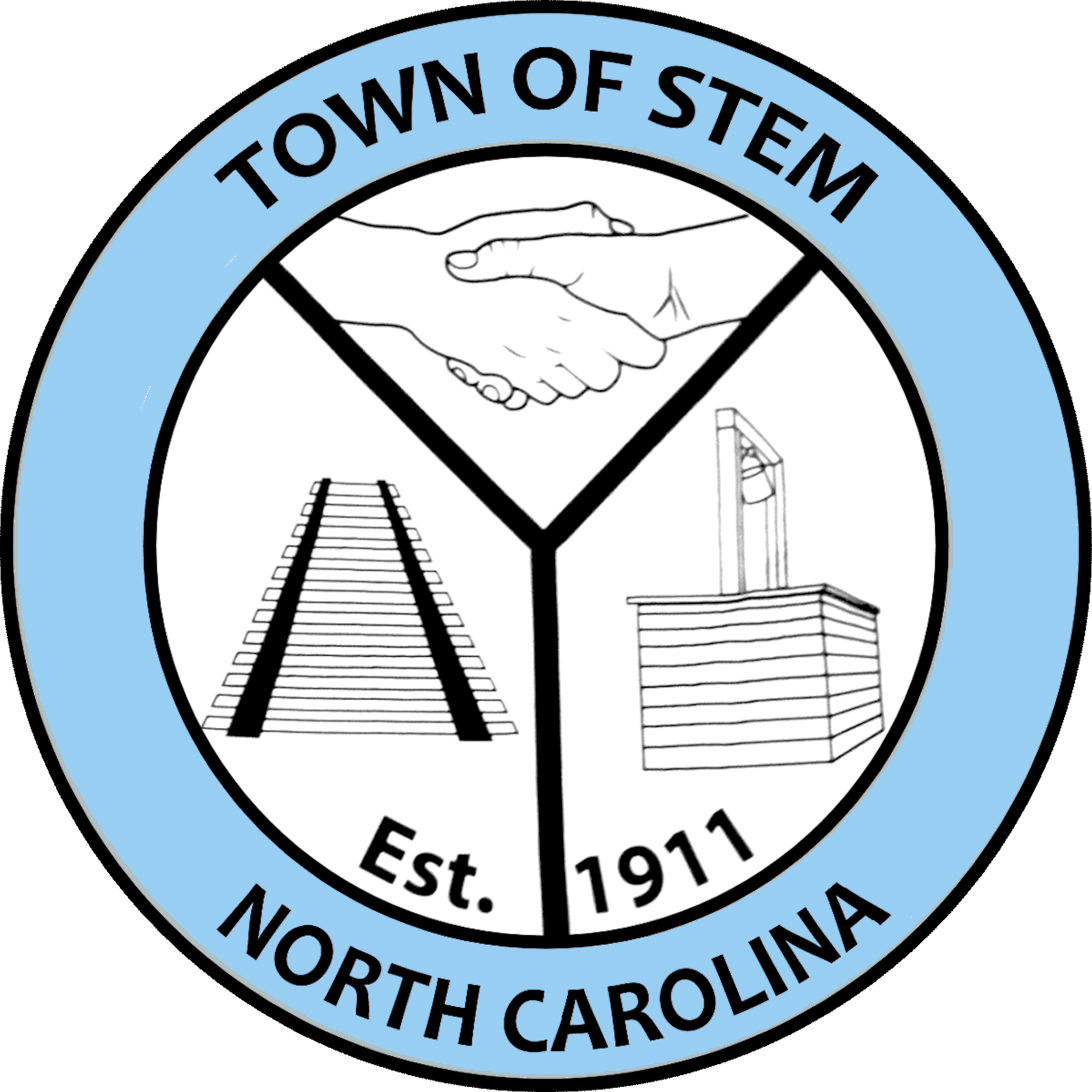
- Seal

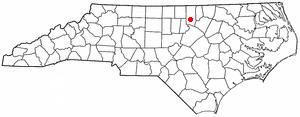
- Location of Stem, North Carolina
- Coordinates: 36°11′46″N 78°43′13″W
- Country: United States
- State: North Carolina
- County: Granville
- Incorporated: 1911
- Named for: W. T. Stem

Area
  - Total: 1.51 sq mi (3.92 km^{2})
  - Land: 1.51 sq mi (3.91 km^{2})
  - Water: 0 sq mi (0.00 km^{2})
- Elevation: 453 ft (138 m)

Population (2020)
  - Total: 960
  - Density: 635/sq mi (245.3/km^{2})
- Time zone: UTC-5 (Eastern (EST))
  - Summer (DST): UTC-4 (EDT)
- ZIP code: 27581
- Area code: 919
- FIPS code: 37-65320
- GNIS feature ID: 2406665
- Website: stemnc.org

Stem is a town in Granville County, North Carolina, United States. The population was 960 at the 2020 census.

== History ==
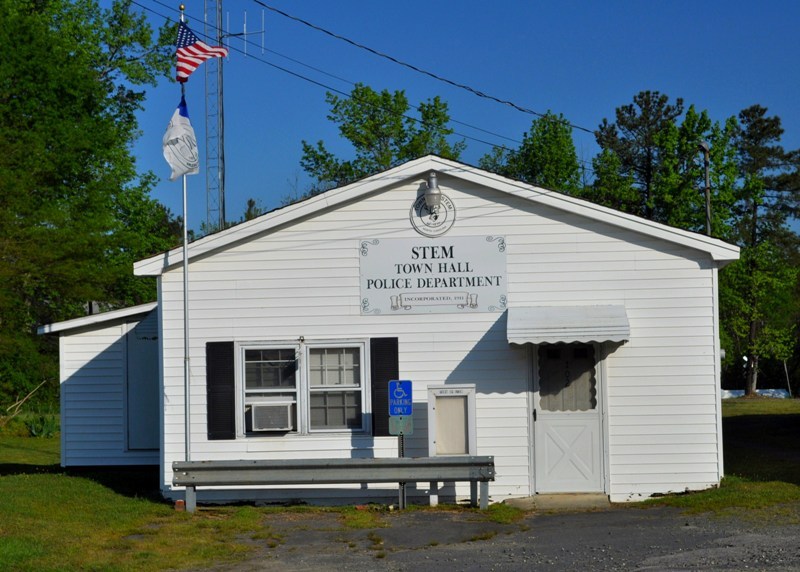
Stem Town Hall

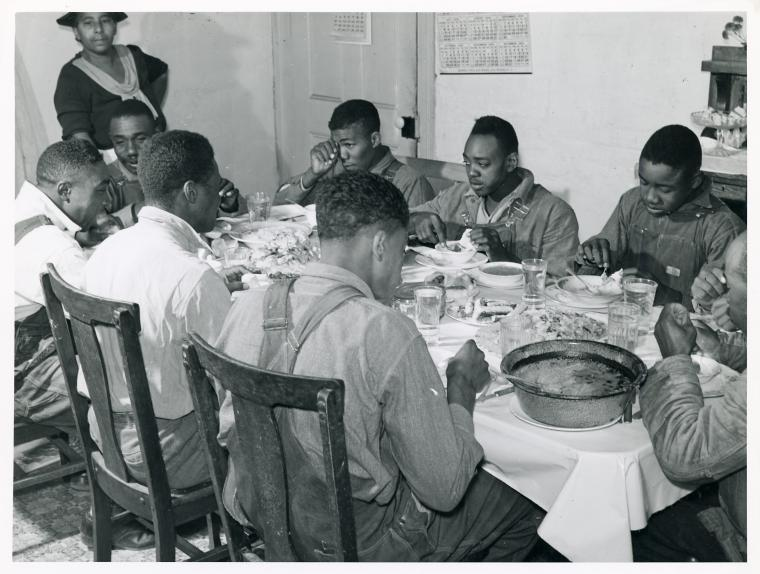
A dinner in Tally Ho, Stem, for African American tenants and neighbors after a day of corn shucking, 1939

The town of Stem was established as a separate and distinct entity from Tally Ho township in 1888 by William Thomas Stem. The Stem family were co-proprietors of a general store in the Tally Ho township and owners of the land where a new spur of the Richmond and Danville Railroad terminated. Stem was built around this new rail station. The town was incorporated in 1911.

Stem is home to the historic Cozart-Coley House. Tally Ho township was the childhood home of James Webb, after whom the space telescope is named.

== Geography ==
According to the United States Census Bureau, the town has a total area of 1.5 square miles (3.9 km^{2}), including 35,338 square feet (3,283.0 m^{2}) of water area.

Stem is located in the Tally Ho voting precinct of Granville County.

== Schools ==
The town of Stem is assigned to the following schools:

- Elementary School (K-5) - Butner-Stem Elementary School
- Middle School (6–8) - Granville Central Middle School

== Stem High School vs. UNC - Chapel Hill, 1936 ==
Long-time residents of Granville County recall the tale of how the Stem High School basketball team played and defeated the University of North Carolina at Chapel Hill men's team in an impromptu basketball game. As the story goes, the Stem team won the Granville County championship in 1936 and were rewarded by their coach (known only as Coach Pegram) with a trip to see UNC play Davidson at the Tin Can. The Davidson team was unable to show because of a snowstorm, so Coach Pegram volunteered his team so that the crowd could still watch a game. The team from Stem (Brent Meadows, Wallace Bowling, Thomas Farabow, Clyde Cates, and James "Bunk" Guthrie) played well against their college opponents, and in the end won the game on a dramatic last-second shot.

The story is unverified in contemporaneous sources. If the game occurred, it is most likely to have taken place on February 12, 1936, when an influenza outbreak caused the cancellation of a UNC/Davidson basketball game. "Bunk" Guthrie would have been 22 years old at the time and 4 years past his graduation (though the Stem team was disqualified from the 1934 county championship for using ineligible players, so this does not necessarily rule out his participation in 1936). The Daily Tar Heel from February 13, 1936, mentions only that the team practiced on the date of the cancelled Davidson game to prepare for their upcoming contest against North Carolina State. The story (true or not) has become a piece of local legend and brought statewide attention to the town of Stem in 1999 when it was covered by Frank Newell for the Warren Record of Warren County, and again in 2000 when it was covered by Ned Barnett on the front page of the News & Observer.

== Demographics ==
Historical population
| Census | Pop. | Note | %± |
|---|---|---|---|
| 1920 | 245 | | — |
| 1930 | 256 | | 4.5% |
| 1940 | 218 | | −14.8% |
| 1950 | 217 | | −0.5% |
| 1960 | 221 | | 1.8% |
| 1970 | 242 | | 9.5% |
| 1980 | 222 | | −8.3% |
| 1990 | 249 | | 12.2% |
| 2000 | 229 | | −8.0% |
| 2010 | 463 | | 102.2% |
| 2020 | 960 | | 107.3% |
U.S. Decennial Census

As of the census of 2020, there were 960 people in 466 households. The population density was 640.0 inhabitants per square mile (247.1/km^{2}). The average housing density was 310.7 per square mile (118.9/km^{2}). The racial makeup of the town was 64.2% White, 21.7% African American, 0.5% Native American, 0.4% Asian, 6.9% identified as "Some Other Race Alone", and 6.1% as "Two or More Races". Hispanic or Latino of any race were 12.1% of the population.

There were 466 households, out of which 49.3% had children under the age of 18 living with them. The average household size was 2.50.

In the town, the population was spread out, with 31.5% aged 19 or younger, 15.8% aged 20 to 29, 21.1% aged 30 to 39, 14.1% aged 40 to 49, 10.6% from 50 to 64, and 7.0% who were 65 years of age or older. The median age was 32.1 years. For every 100 females, there were 82.7 males.

The median income for a household in the town was $73,750 with a mean household income of $100,380. The per capita income for the town was $40,764. About 2.7% of the population were below the poverty line, including 1.4% of those under the age of eighteen.
