= Granville County, North Carolina =

County in North Carolina, United States

- County
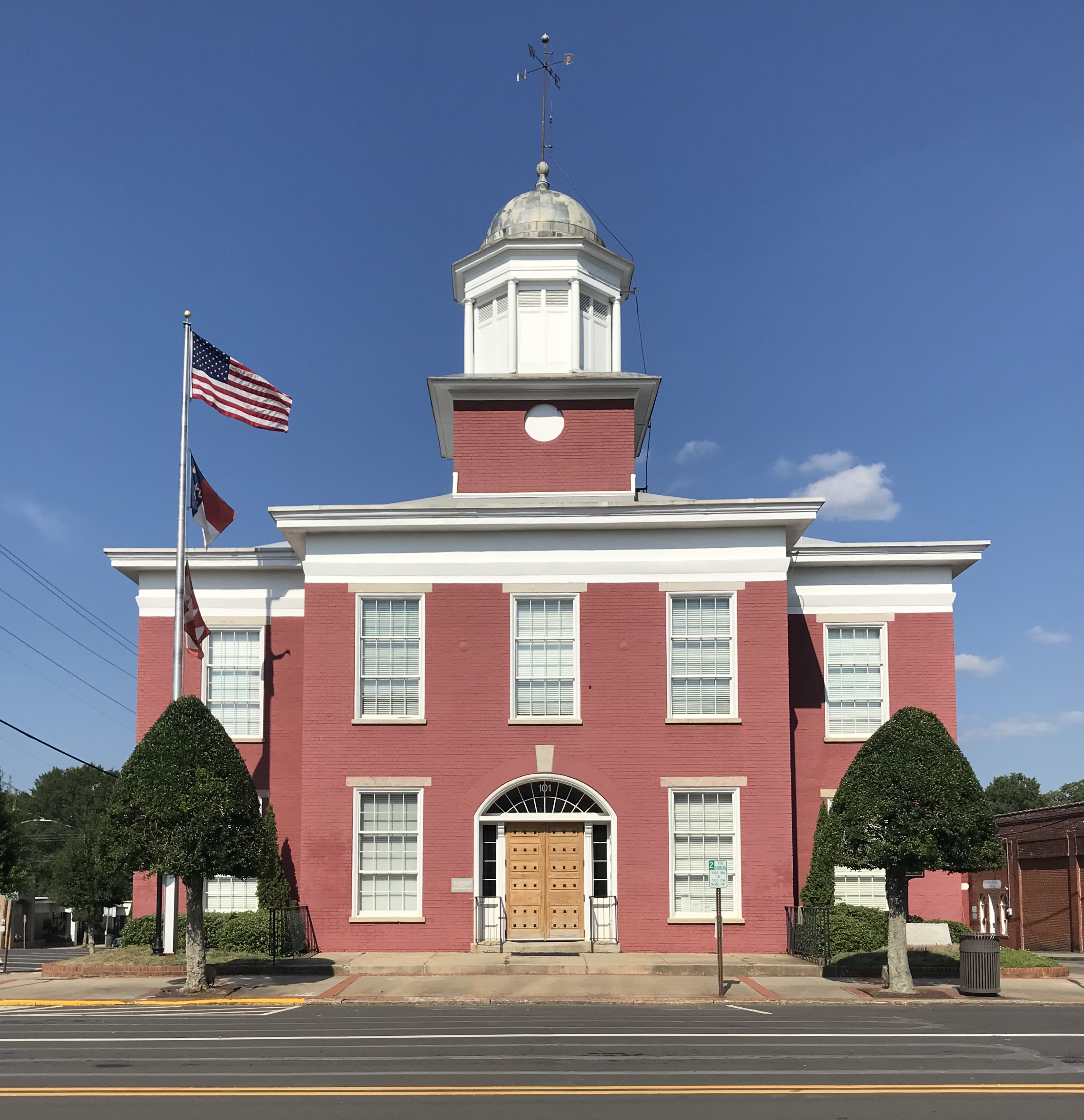
- Granville County Courthouse

- Flag Seal

- Location within the U.S. state of North Carolina
- Coordinates: 36.30°N 78.66°W
- Country: United States
- State: North Carolina
- Established: June 28, 1746 (280 years ago)
- Named for: John Carteret, 2nd Earl Granville
- Seat: Oxford
- Largest community: Oxford

Area
  - Total: 537.59 sq mi (1,392.4 km^{2})
  - Land: 531.99 sq mi (1,377.8 km^{2})
  - Water: 5.60 sq mi (14.5 km^{2}) 1.04%

Population (2020)
  - Total: 60,992
  - Estimate (2025): 61,421 ▲
  - Density: 114.65/sq mi (44.266/km^{2})
- Congressional districts: 1st, 13th
- Website: granvillecounty.org

Granville County is a county located on the northern central border of the U.S. state of North Carolina. As of the 2020 census, the population was 60,992. Its county seat is Oxford. The county has access to Kerr Lake and Falls Lake and is part of the Roanoke, Tar and Neuse River watersheds.

== History ==
=== 18th century ===
Granville County and St. John's Parish were established on June 28, 1746, from the upper part of Edgecombe County. It was named for the John Carteret, 2nd Earl Granville, who as heir to one of the eight original Lords Proprietors of the Province of Carolina, claimed one eighth of the land granted in the charter of 1665. The claim was established as consisting of approximately the northern half of North Carolina, and this territory came to be known as the Granville District, also known as Oxford.

In 1752, parts of Granville, Bladen, and Johnston counties were combined to form Orange County. In 1764, the eastern part of Granville County was reassigned to the new Bute County. Finally, in 1881, parts of Granville, Franklin, and Warren counties were taken to be combined as Vance County.

Like most early counties on the eastern side of the early North Carolina colony, Granville was site of the Tuscarora uprising. Once the natives were defeated in the Tuscarora War, Virginia farmers and their families settled Granville County, where they concentrated on tobacco as a commodity crop. The economy of the region was dependent on slave labor, as tobacco was very labor-intensive to cultivate and process. By the start of the Civil War, Granville planters worked more than 10,000 slaves on their farms, at a time when total county population was 23,396.

=== 19th century ===
During the American Civil War, more than 2,000 men from Granville County served the Confederacy. One company was known as the "Granville Grays." Most of these men fought in the major battles of the war. Surprisingly, many survived until the end of the war. Although the war brought an end to the plantation and slave labor economy that had made Granville County prosperous, the agricultural sector continued to thrive in the county. Freedmen stayed in Oxford to work, and the discovery of bright leaf tobacco stimulated the industry. Many African Americans in Granville County were already free before the start of the war; some had migrated into North Carolina as free people from Virginia in the colonial era. The free people of color before the Civil War were often descendants of families formed by unions between white women (who were free) and African or African-American men before the American Revolution. They made lasting contributions to the region, particularly through their skilled labor. Several black masons constructed homes for the county's wealthy landowners. Additionally, the bright leaf tobacco crop proved a successful agricultural product for Granville County. The sandy soil and a new tobacco crop that could be "flue-dried" proved a great incentive to farmers and tobacco manufacturers.

According to historian William S. Powell, Granville has remained a top tobacco-producing county in North Carolina for several decades. By the late 1800s and early 1900s, Oxford had become a thriving town with new industries, schools, literary institutions, and orphanages, due to jobs created by the bright tobacco crop.

In the late 1800s and early 1900s, northern Granville County, together with Halifax County, Virginia, were important mining areas. Copper, tungsten, silver and gold were mined in the region. The Richmond to Danville Railroad was a critical lifeline to the northern part of the county and provided an important link for miners and farmers to get their goods to larger markets in Richmond and Washington, D.C.

From the late 19th century into the early 20th century, whites in Granville County lynched six African Americans, a number of extralegal murders equalled by two other counties in the state. Most of these killings took place in the decades around the turn of the century. Each of the three counties is tied in having the second-highest number of lynchings per county. Among these was a double lynching in the county seat on December 1, 1881. An armed mob of masked men stormed into the county jail, forcing the jailer to give them the keys. They took out John Brodie and Shadrack Hester, two African-American men charged with murdering a local white man. They took the prisoners to a tree near where the death took place, and hanged them.

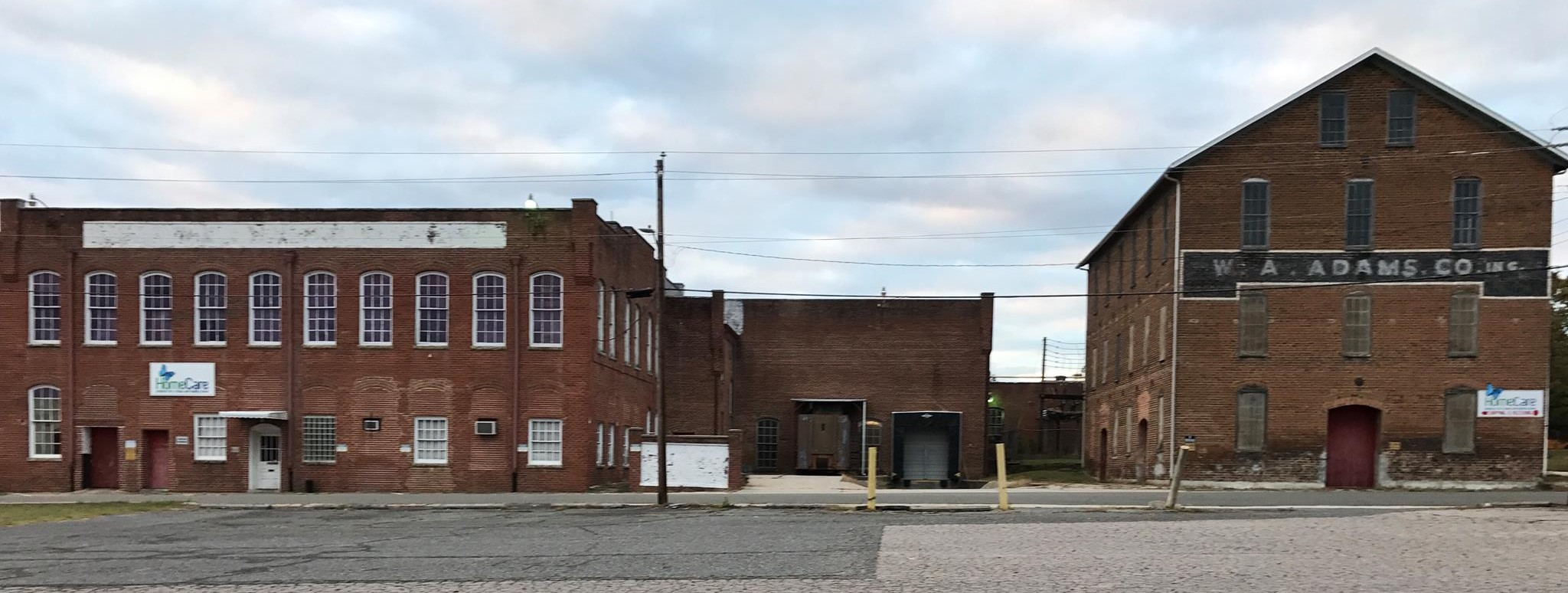
Historic tobacco warehouses in Oxford

During the late 1800s and early 1900s, Granville County played a pivotal role as tobacco supplier for the southeast United States. With many farms and contracts tied to major tobacco companies, such as American Tobacco Company, Lorillard, Brown & Williamson, and Liggett Group, the local farmers became prosperous. During the Great Depression, the tobacco fields were subject to a new plant disease. The Granville Wilt Disease, as it became known, destroyed tobacco crops all across northern North Carolina. Botanists and horticulturists found a cure for the disease at the Tobacco Research Center located in Oxford.

=== 20th century ===
In August 1941, the U.S. federal government beginning planning for the development of a military facility in southern Granville County, motivated partly by its proximity to a rail line. Following the United States' entry into World War II that December, planning hastened and in January 1942 the government began ordering locals to vacate their land. The government ultimately evicted between 400 and 500 families and razed most of their homes and agricultural buildings to make way for a U.S. Army camp. Construction commenced in March and Camp Butner officially opened in August 1942. Thousands of soldiers were trained at the camp for service overseas, and it also housed a prisoner of war facility. By April 1946, activity at the facility had declined significantly and it was officially closed in January 1947. Following the camp's closure, its land was divided up among the U.S. War Assets Administration, the North Carolina National Guard, the state of North Carolina, and the dispossessed farmers who had once lived in the area. The state converted its former infirmary into a psychiatry hospital. A civilian community, Butner, subsequently developed around the hospital's new workforce.

In the 1950s and 1960s, various manufacturing businesses built up across Granville County, and the region gradually became more industrialized. Today, the manufacturing industry produces cosmetics, tires, and clothing products in Granville County.

== Geography ==
Interactive map of Granville County

According to the U.S. Census Bureau, the county has a total area of 537.59 square miles (1,392.4 km^{2}), of which 531.99 square miles (1,377.8 km^{2}) is land and 5.60 square miles (14.5 km^{2}) (1.04%) is water.

=== State and local protected areas ===
- Butner-Falls of Neuse Game Land (part)
- Ledge Creek Forest Conservation Area
- Roberts Chapel Conservation Area

=== Major water bodies ===
- Beaver Dam Lake
- Beaverdam Creek
- Coon Creek
- Falls Lake
- Fishing Creek
- Island Creek Reservoir
- John H. Kerr Reservoir
- Lake Butner
- Lake Devin
- Roanoke River
- Smith Creek
- Tar River

=== Adjacent counties ===
- Halifax County, Virginia – north
- Mecklenburg County, Virginia – north
- Vance County – east
- Franklin County – east
- Wake County – south
- Durham County – southwest
- Person County – west

=== Major highways ===
- I-85
- US 15
- US 158
- US 158 Bus.
- NC 49
- NC 50
- NC 56
- NC 96

=== Major infrastructure ===
- Henderson-Oxford Airport

== Demographics ==
Historical population
Census	Pop.	Note	%±
1790	10,982		—
1800	14,015		27.6%
1810	15,576		11.1%
1820	18,222		17.0%
1830	19,355		6.2%
1840	18,817		−2.8%
1850	21,249		12.9%
1860	23,396		10.1%
1870	24,831		6.1%
1880	31,286		26.0%
1890	24,484		−21.7%
1900	23,263		−5.0%
1910	25,102		7.9%
1920	26,846		6.9%
1930	28,723		7.0%
1940	29,344		2.2%
1950	31,793		8.3%
1960	33,110		4.1%
1970	32,762		−1.1%
1980	34,043		3.9%
1990	38,345		12.6%
2000	48,498		26.5%
2010	57,538		18.6%
2020	60,992		6.0%
2025 (est.)	61,421	▲	0.7%
U.S. Decennial Census; 1790–1960 1900–1990; 1990–2000 2010 2020

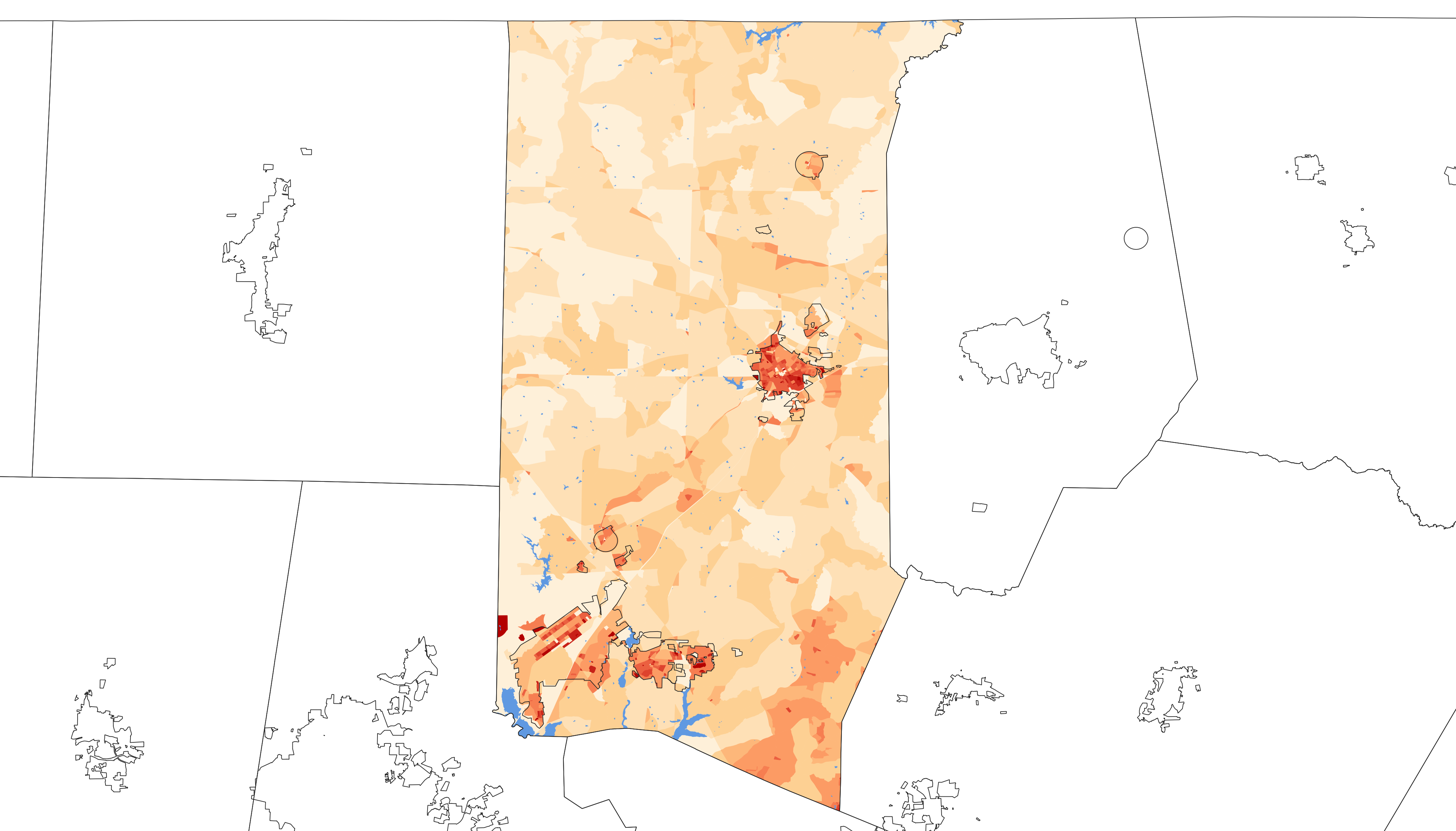
2020 population density of Granville County NC by census block

=== Racial and ethnic composition ===
Granville County, North Carolina – Racial and ethnic composition Note: the US Census treats Hispanic/Latino as an ethnic category. This table excludes Latinos from the racial categories and assigns them to a separate category. Hispanics/Latinos may be of any race.
Race / Ethnicity (NH = Non-Hispanic)	Pop 1980	Pop 1990	Pop 2000	Pop 2010	Pop 2020	% 1980	% 1990	% 2000	% 2010	% 2020
White alone (NH)	18,771	22,913	28,777	34,550	33,610	55.14%	59.75%	59.34%	57.66%	55.11%
Black or African American alone (NH)	14,749	14,872	16,854	19,454	18,315	43.32%	38.78%	34.75%	32.47%	30.03%
Native American or Alaska Native alone (NH)	53	93	195	250	205	0.16%	0.24%	0.40%	0.42%	0.34%
Asian alone (NH)	62	99	173	321	366	0.18%	0.26%	0.36%	0.54%	0.60%
Native Hawaiian or Pacific Islander alone (NH)	x	x	9	22	24	x	x	0.02%	0.04%	0.04%
Other race alone (NH)	23	12	114	56	207	0.07%	0.03%	0.24%	0.09%	0.34%
Mixed race or Multiracial (NH)	x	x	425	781	2,054	x	x	0.88%	1.30%	3.37%
Hispanic or Latino (any race)	385	356	1,951	4,482	6,211	1.13%	0.93%	4.02%	7.48%	10.18%
Total	34,043	38,345	48,498	59,916	60,992	100.00%	100.00%	100.00%	100.00%	100.00%

=== 2020 census ===
As of the 2020 census, there were 60,992 people, 22,461 households, and 15,182 families residing in the county. The median age was 42.0 years, with 21.0% of residents under the age of 18 and 17.0% of residents 65 years of age or older. For every 100 females there were 105.1 males, and for every 100 females age 18 and over there were 104.2 males age 18 and over.

The racial makeup of the county was 56.7% White, 30.2% Black or African American, 0.6% American Indian and Alaska Native, 0.6% Asian, 0.1% Native Hawaiian and Pacific Islander, 6.4% from some other race, and 5.4% from two or more races. Hispanic or Latino residents of any race comprised 10.2% of the population.

28.6% of residents lived in urban areas, while 71.4% lived in rural areas.

There were 22,461 households in the county, of which 31.7% had children under the age of 18 living in them. Of all households, 49.5% were married-couple households, 16.3% were households with a male householder and no spouse or partner present, and 28.2% were households with a female householder and no spouse or partner present. About 25.2% of all households were made up of individuals and 11.3% had someone living alone who was 65 years of age or older.

There were 24,214 housing units, of which 7.2% were vacant. Among occupied housing units, 74.8% were owner-occupied and 25.2% were renter-occupied. The homeowner vacancy rate was 1.1% and the rental vacancy rate was 6.0%.

=== 2017 census estimate ===
The median income for a household in the county was $48,196, and the mean household income was $55,849. The median and mean income for a family was $56,493 and $64,311, respectively. The per capita income for the county was $21,201. About 7.6% of families and 11.9% of the population were below the poverty line, including 14.4% of those under age 18 and 11.1% of those age 65 or over.

== Law and government ==
Granville County is a member of the Kerr-Tar Regional Council of Governments. Granville County is governed by a commissioner/manager form of government under the laws of the state of North Carolina. Granville County has seven commissioner electoral districts.

The Granville County Commissioners are Timothy Karan(chair), Jimmy Gooch(Vice-chair), Zelodis Jay, Rob Williford, Mark Griffin, Tony Cozart and Russ May. The County Manager is Drew Cummings.

=== Politics ===
United States presidential election results for Granville County, North Carolina
Year	Republican		Democratic		Third party(ies)	
Year	No.	%	No.	%	No.	%
1912	192	9.16%	1,561	74.48%	343	16.36%
1916	648	27.45%	1,713	72.55%	0	0.00%
1920	833	24.11%	2,622	75.89%	0	0.00%
1924	461	17.11%	2,220	82.37%	14	0.52%
1928	858	22.46%	2,962	77.54%	0	0.00%
1932	212	5.26%	3,808	94.51%	9	0.22%
1936	185	4.14%	4,279	95.86%	0	0.00%
1940	213	5.15%	3,924	94.85%	0	0.00%
1944	325	9.18%	3,215	90.82%	0	0.00%
1948	334	8.10%	3,513	85.25%	274	6.65%
1952	1,166	20.28%	4,583	79.72%	0	0.00%
1956	1,463	26.72%	4,013	73.28%	0	0.00%
1960	1,798	26.66%	4,945	73.34%	0	0.00%
1964	2,624	36.34%	4,596	63.66%	0	0.00%
1968	1,837	21.50%	2,638	30.87%	4,071	47.64%
1972	6,037	66.82%	2,918	32.30%	80	0.89%
1976	2,955	35.84%	5,244	63.59%	47	0.57%
1980	3,513	37.99%	5,556	60.09%	177	1.91%
1984	6,302	54.42%	5,217	45.05%	61	0.53%
1988	4,880	46.75%	5,280	50.58%	279	2.67%
1992	4,538	37.42%	6,178	50.94%	1,412	11.64%
1996	5,498	42.95%	6,747	52.71%	555	4.34%
2000	7,364	48.47%	7,733	50.90%	97	0.64%
2004	9,491	51.02%	9,057	48.69%	53	0.28%
2008	11,447	46.30%	13,074	52.88%	204	0.83%
2012	12,405	47.21%	13,598	51.75%	272	1.04%
2016	13,591	49.69%	12,909	47.19%	853	3.12%
2020	16,647	52.68%	14,565	46.09%	386	1.22%
2024	17,383	54.15%	14,365	44.75%	356	1.11%

Granville County was long a Democratic stronghold, for the most part, if not exclusively, only supporting Democratic candidates in presidential election until 1968, when it supported George Wallace. Today, it is somewhat of a national bellwether, having from 1992 onward supported the national winner in all the presidential elections with the exception of 2000, when it supported Al Gore, and 2020, when it supported Donald Trump.

=== Granville County Courthouse ===
The Granville County Courthouse, of Greek Revival architecture, was built in 1840 and added to the National Register of Historic Places in 1979.

== Economy ==
In its 2025 county economic tier ratings, the North Carolina Department of Commerce classified Granville as among the state's 20 least economically distressed counties, or "tier 1".

== Education ==
The Granville County Schools contains 7 elementary schools, 2 middle schools, 4 high schools

=== High Schools ===
- J. F. Webb High School (Oxford)
- Granville Early College High (affiliated with Vance-Granville Community College, which has a campus in Butner) (Creedmoor)
- South Granville High School (Creedmoor)

=== Middle Schools ===
- Granville Central Middle School (Stem)
- Northern Granville Middle (Oxford) (traditional and year-round)

=== Elementary Schools ===
- Butner-Stem Elementary (Butner) (traditional and year-round)
- C.G. Credle Elementary (Oxford)
- Mt. Energy Elementary (Creedmoor)
- Stovall-Shaw Elementary (Stovall)
- Tar River Elementary (Franklinton)
- West Oxford Elementary (Oxford) (traditional and year-round)
- Wilton Elementary (Franklinton)

== Communities ==
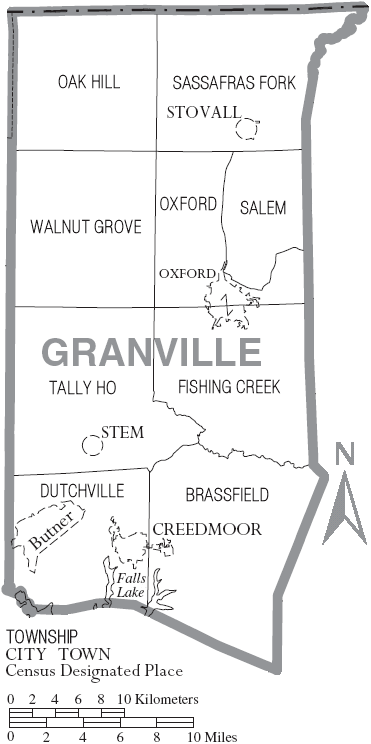
Map of Granville County with municipal and township labels

=== Cities ===
- Creedmoor
- Oxford (county seat and largest community)

=== Towns ===
- Butner
- Stem
- Stovall

=== Townships ===
- Brassfield
- Dutchville
- Fishing Creek
- Oak Hill
- Oxford
- Salem
- Sassafras Fork
- Tally Ho
- Walnut Grove

=== Unincorporated communities ===
- Berea
- Brassfield
- Bullock
- Cozart
- Culbreth
- Dexter
- Grassy Creek
- Grissom
- Kinton Fork
- Lewis
- Northside
- Oak Hill
- Providence
- Shake Rag
- Shoofly
- Tally Ho
- Virgilina
- Wilbourns
- Wilton

== Notable people ==
- Joseph Penn Breedlove, Duke University librarian 1898–1946
- Tiny Broadwick, first female parachutist
- Benjamin Chavis, Civil Rights leader
- Franklin Wills Hancock Jr., former representative for North Carolina's 5th congressional district
- Richard H. Moore, politician and former North Carolina State Treasurer
- John Penn, signer of the Declaration of Independence
- Sam Ragan, journalist
- Thad Stem Jr., poet
- James E. Webb, NASA administrator and namesake of the James Webb Space Telescope

== See also ==
- List of counties in North Carolina
- National Register of Historic Places listings in Granville County, North Carolina
