= Thorndale =

Thorndale may refer to:

== Australia ==
- Thorndale, Queensland, a locality in the Southern Downs Region

== Canada ==
- Thorndale, Ontario

== United States ==
- Thorndale, Pennsylvania
- Thorndale, Texas
- Thorndale (Oxford, North Carolina), a historic plantation house

== See also ==
- Thorndale station (disambiguation)
