= Peoples Bank of Philadelphia =

Peoples Bank of Philadelphia was a bank that went bankrupt in 1898 resulting a political scandal and allegations of corruption and misuse of state funds. It was a state depository.

Peoples Bank of Philadelphia was a bank in Philadelpgia, Pennsylvania that failed in 1898. There were allegations of political corruption. The bank's cashier committed suicide after the scandal broke.

It was a depositary of state funds.

U.S. Senator Matthew Quay was indicted before being acquitted. His son was also accused of involvement as were other Republican Party political leaders in the state. Quay's defense successfully invoked the statute of limitations.

The Library of Congress has five folders of papers related to the bank in a collection of Matthew Quay's papers.

There was also a People's Savings Bank of Philadelphia at 1508 Lombard Street organized by former U.S. congressman of North Carolina George Henry White and managed by blacks. It too failed.
