= Frederick A. Woodard =

American politician and lawyer (1854–1915)

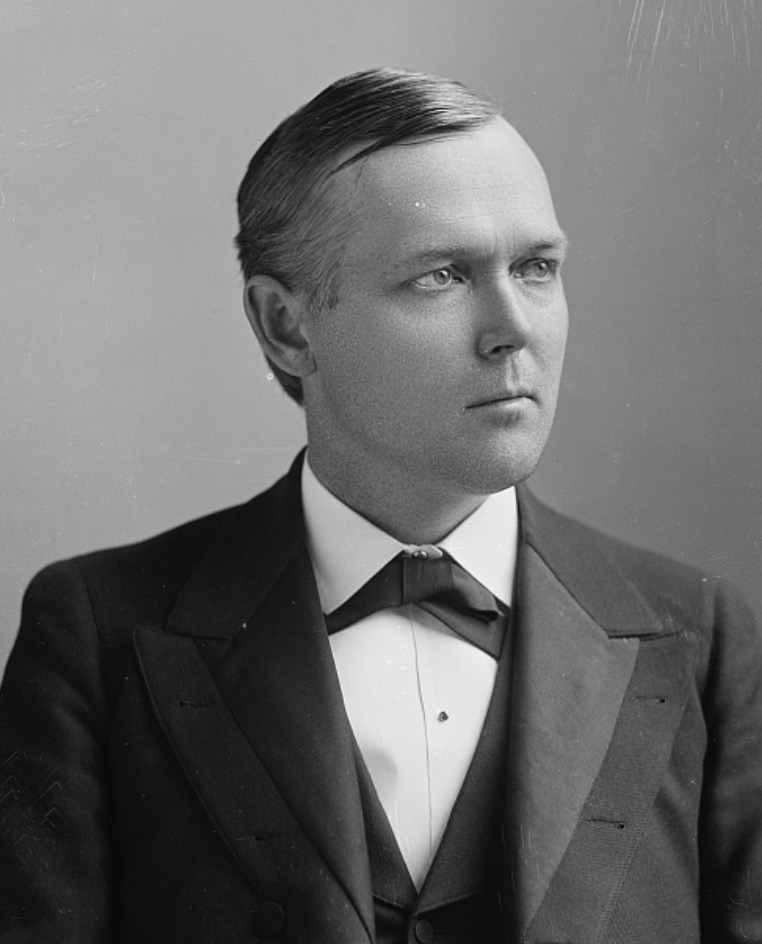
- Portrait of Woodard by Charles Milton Bell, taken between February 1894 and February 1901

Member of the U.S. House of Representatives from North Carolina's 2nd district
- In office March 4, 1893 – March 3, 1897
- Preceded by: Henry P. Cheatham
- Succeeded by: George Henry White

Personal details
- Born: Frederick Augustus Woodard; February 12, 1854 Black Creek Township, Wilson County, North Carolina, US
- Died: May 8, 1915 (aged 61) Wilson, North Carolina, US
- Party: Democratic
- Relations: Moses Rountree (father-in-law)
- Occupation: Politician, lawyer

Frederick Augustus Woodard (erroneously Frederich; February 12, 1854 – May 8, 1915) was an American politician and lawyer. A Democrat, he was a member of the United States House of Representatives from North Carolina.

Born in Wilson County, North Carolina, Woodard studied law under Richmond Mumford Pearson and practiced law. He served in the House from 1893 to 1897, representing North Carolina's 2nd district. Politically, he was liberal.

== Early life and education ==
Woodard was born on February 12, 1854, in Black Creek Township, Wilson County, North Carolina, near Wilson, North Carolina, the son of planter and physician Stephen Woodard and Mary Melvina (née Hadley) Woodard. He was of English ancestry.

Woodard was educated at a private school in Stantonsburg. He read law under Richmond Mumford Pearson, and according to Henry G. Connor, Woodard was one of Pearson's best students. In 1873, he was admitted to the bar, and in January 1874, was sworn before the North Carolina Supreme Court.

== Career ==
After being admitted to the bar, Woodard began practicing law in Wilson. He entered a partnership with Connor. He was later vice-president of the First National Bank of Wilson.

Woodard was a Democrat. He gained political prominence by being part of local political boards. In 1884, he unsuccessfully ran for election to the United States House of Representatives. He was a member of the House from March 4, 1893, to March 3, 1897, representing North Carolina's 2nd district. While serving, he was a member of the Committees on Alcoholic Liquor Traffic, on Claims, on Elections, and on Levees and Improvements of the Mississippi River. He lost the following election. He was a candidate for election in 1900, but Claude Kitchin was chosen instead. Politically, he was liberal.

After serving in Congress, Woodard returned to practicing law in Wilson. He was a trustee of the University of North Carolina and of the local graded schools. In 1913, he was appointed by Governor Charles Brantley Aycock to represent Wilson County before the North Carolina Supreme Court on railroad matters.

== Personal life and death ==
In 1876 or 1878, Woodard married Frances "Fannie" Elizabeth Rountree, the daughter of Moses Rountree; they had a son together. She died in 1894, and on March 9, 1898, he married Roe Ella Holleman (née Robbins). He was a member of the Methodist Episcopal Church. He died on May 8, 1915, aged 61, in Wilson, and was buried at Maplewood Cemetery. A school in Wilson was named for him.

U.S. House of Representatives
Preceded by Henry P. Cheatham	Member of the U.S. House of Representatives from North Carolina's 2nd congressional district 1893–1897	Succeeded by George H. White
