= John H. Collins (lawyer) =

North Carolina lawyer and state solicitor

John H. Collins was a lawyer. He was elected to two terms as solicitor of the Second Judicial District in North Carolina. He lost the election to a third term to George Henry White. Both were African American.

He was first elected in 1878 and served 8 years. His nomination by Republicans caused a stir because he was African American. Democrats were furious. He was the only black solicitor in North Carolina.

== See also ==
- Josephus Daniels, a white Democrat newspaper writer
- Enfield, North Carolina
