= Central Children's Home of North Carolina =

Historic educational facility in North Carolina, US

- Central Orphanage
- U.S. National Register of Historic Places
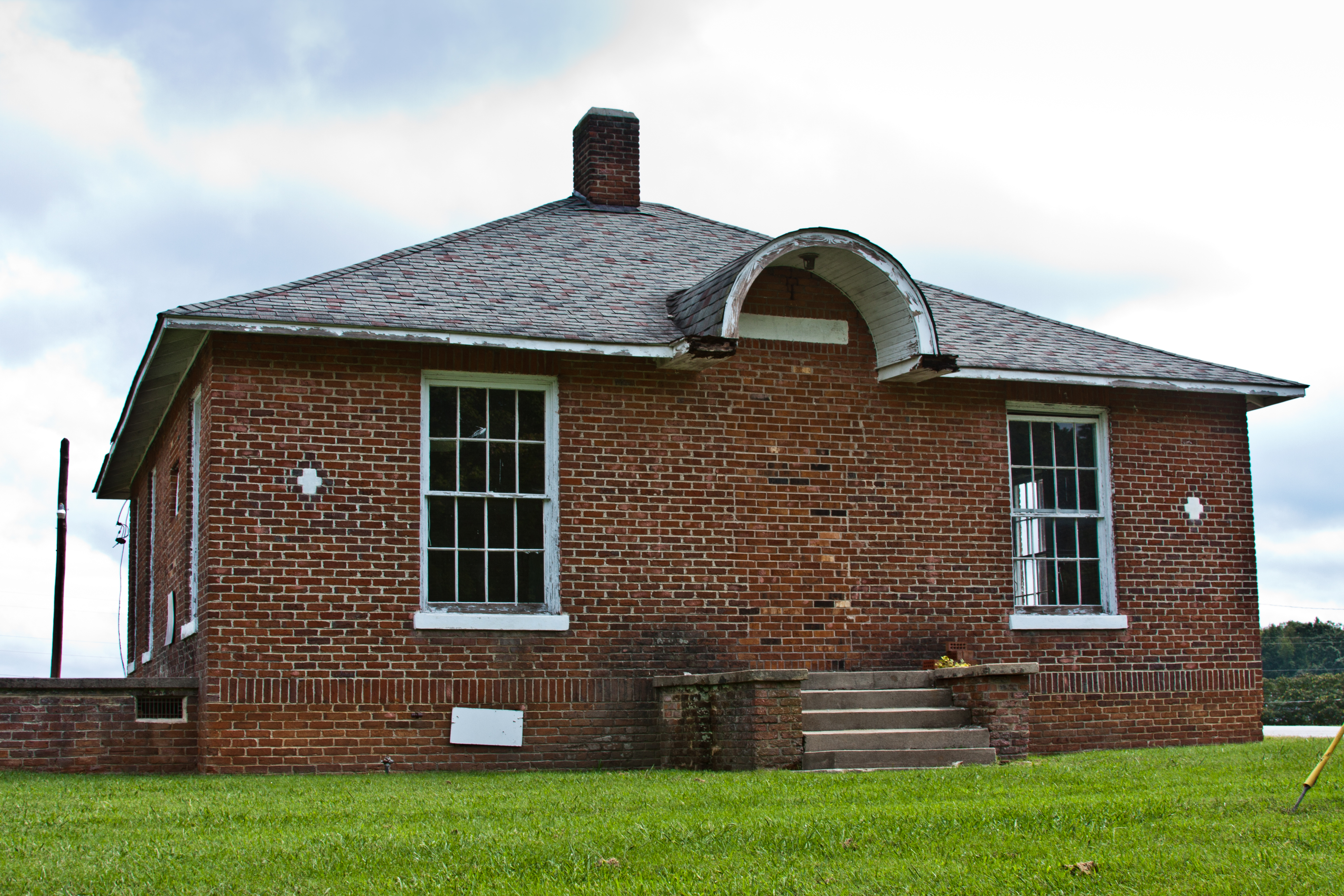
- Central Children's Home auxiliary building

- Location within North Carolina Location within the United States
- Location: Antioch Dr. and Raleigh Rd. in Oxford, North Carolina
- Coordinates: 36°17′35″N 78°34′21″W
- Area: 2 acres (0.81 ha)
- Built: 1883
- Architectural style: Italianate
- MPS: Granville County MPS
- NRHP reference No.: 88001257
- Added to NRHP: August 31, 1988

The Central Children's Home of North Carolina, officially the Central Children's Home of North Carolina, Inc., and historically known as Grant Colored Asylum, was founded in Oxford, North Carolina, in 1883. The home is a residential group environment for children up to young adults.

A state historical marker was placed in front of the building by the North Carolina Department of Cultural Resources Historical Marker Program.

== Mission ==
The Central Children's Home cares for disadvantaged, orphaned, and troubled children. Admission is accepted from social services organizations that includes the North Carolina Department of Social Services for applicants between the ages of nine and twenty-one with an IQ of 70 or above. The Robert L. Shepard Scholarship Fund was established in 1943, to aid children seeking a college education or vocational training.

== History ==
The Orphanage was established as a segregated orphanage with congressional funding in 1883, through the Colored Orphanage Association (formed in 1882), that was supported by Congressman Henry P. Cheatham. A twenty-three-acre farm was purchased for $1,565.00 just outside Oxford. The city has grown and the home is now inside the area known as Southern Oxford. The orphanage building was built in 1915, and is a two-story brick building with a 3 1/2-story tower and Italianate style design elements. Other early buildings are a small, square, brick building that was erected in 1934 as Cheatham's office and an L-shaped brick building originally built as a smokehouse.

Originally chartered as the Grant Colored Asylum the name was changed to the "Colored Orphanage Asylum of North Carolina" in 1887, the "Colored Orphanage of North Carolina" in 1927, the "Central Orphanage of North Carolina” in 1965, and finally receiving the current name "Central Children’s Home of North Carolina" in 1986. The first director was superintendent, Robert L. Shepard and he directed the Home until Cheatham took over and ran it for 28 years.

== Support ==
Founded with congressional funding, the Children's Home operates through a 30-member Board of Directors on donations from citizens, and organizations. Members of the board of directors include the General Baptist State Convention of North Carolina with 44 member associations, Women's Baptist Home and Foreign Missionary Convention, American Legion Pilgrimage Committee, Prince Hall Grand Lodge, and the Grand Chapter Order of Eastern Star.

== Affiliations ==
The Children's Home is affiliated with the Child Welfare League of America (CWLA), Southeastern Child Care Association, National Association of Homes and Services for Children, Child Welfare League of America, is nationally accredited by the Council on Accreditation, and licensed by the North Carolina Department of Health and Human Services.

== NRHP ==
The building that the children's home was originally located in was entered on the list of the National Register of Historic Places August 31, 1988.
