= Biofuel =

Fuel derived from biological sources

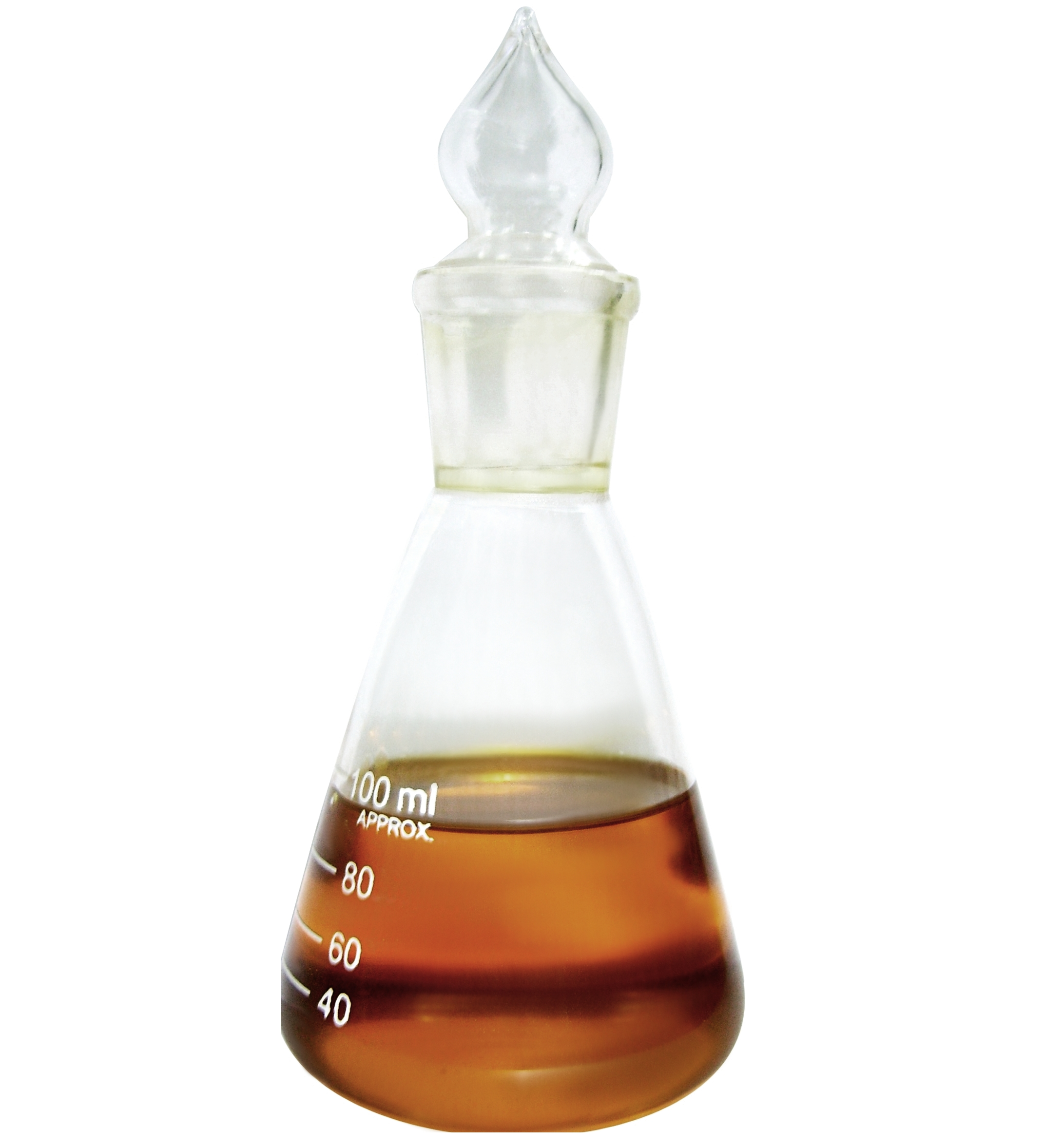
A sample of biodiesel

Biofuel is a fuel that is produced over a short time span from biomass, rather than by the very slow natural processes involved in the formation of fossil fuels such as oil. Biofuel can be produced from plants or from agricultural, domestic or industrial bio waste. Biofuels are mostly used for transportation, but can also be used for heating and electricity. Biofuels (and bioenergy in general) are regarded as a renewable energy source. The use of biofuel has been subject to criticism regarding the "food vs fuel" debate, varied assessments of their sustainability, and ongoing deforestation and biodiversity loss as a result of biofuel production.

The climate impact of biofuels varies considerably according to their feedstocks, production processes, energy inputs and land-use changes. Although the carbon dioxide released during combustion may be partly offset by carbon absorbed during biomass growth, life-cycle assessments also account for emissions from cultivation, processing and transport. However, life-cycle assessments of biofuels have shown large emissions associated with the potential land-use change required to produce additional biofuel feedstocks. The outcomes of lifecycle assessments (LCAs) for biofuels are highly situational and dependent on many factors including the type of feedstock, production routes, data variations, and methodological choices. Estimates about the climate impact from biofuels vary widely based on the methodology and exact situation examined. Therefore, the climate change mitigation potential of biofuel varies considerably: in some scenarios biofuel emission levels are comparable to fossil fuels, and in other scenarios the use of biofuel results in negative emissions.

Global biofuel consumption and production are projected to grow by an average of 1.4% annually between 2026 and 2035. About 80% of the expected growth in demand is projected to occur in emerging economies, particularly India, Brazil and Indonesia. Production growth in middle-income countries is projected to average 3% annually, while growth in high-income countries is expected to slow, partly because of increasing adoption of electric vehicles.

The IEA says that biofuel should particularly be used for applications which are difficult to electrify, such as shipping and aviation. The two most common types of biofuel are bioethanol and biodiesel. The United States is the largest producer of bioethanol, while the EU is the largest producer of biodiesel. Meanwhile, Brazil produces and uses large amounts of bioethanol in vehicles, including in some flex-fuel cars exclusively available in Brazil. The energy content in the global production of bioethanol and biodiesel is 2.2 and 1.8 EJ per year, respectively.

== Terminology ==
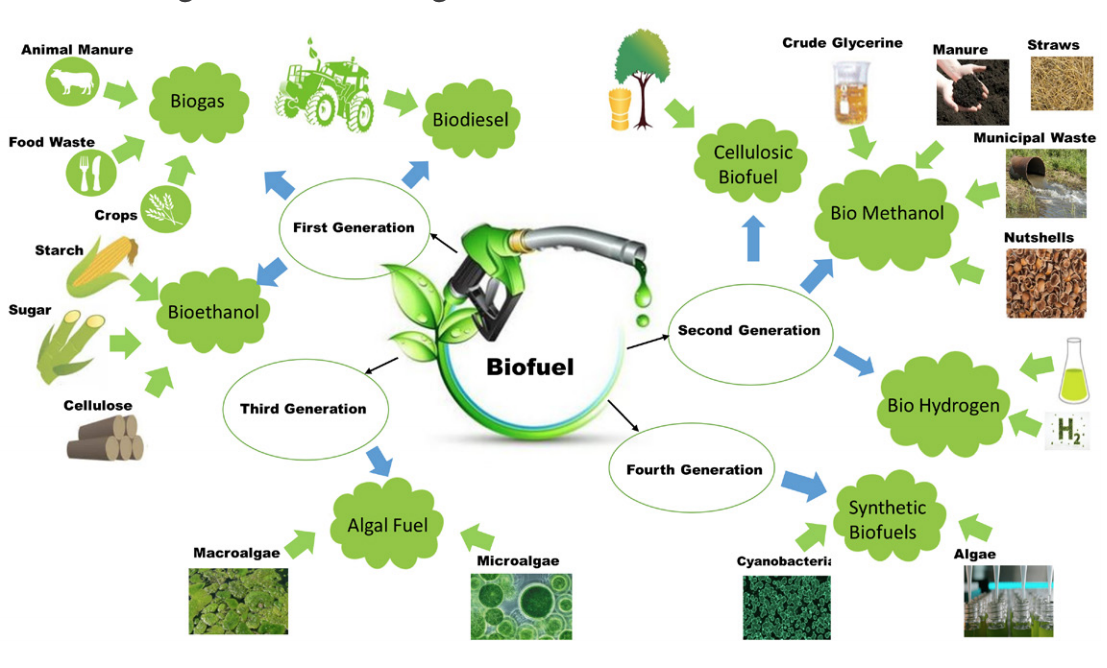
Types and generation of biofuels

The term biofuel is used in different ways. One definition is "Biofuels are biobased products, in solid, liquid, or gaseous forms. They are produced from crops or natural products, such as wood, or agricultural residues, such as molasses and bagasse."

Other publications reserve the term biofuel for liquid or gaseous fuels, used for transportation.

The IPCC Sixth Assessment Report defines biofuel as "A fuel, generally in liquid form, produced from biomass. Biofuels include bioethanol from sugarcane, sugar beet or maize, and biodiesel from canola or soybeans.". It goes on to define biomass in this context as "organic material excluding the material that is fossilized or embedded in geological formations". This means that coal or other fossil fuels is not a form of biomass in this context.

Bioethanol is an alcohol made by fermentation, mostly from carbohydrates produced in sugar or starch crops such as maize, sugarcane, or sweet sorghum. Cellulosic biomass, derived from non-food sources, such as trees and grasses, is also being developed as a feedstock for ethanol production. Ethanol can be used as a fuel for vehicles in its pure form (E100), but it is usually used as a gasoline additive to increase octane ratings and improve vehicle emissions.

Biodiesel is produced from oils or fats using transesterification. It can be used as a fuel for vehicles in its pure form (B100), but it is usually used as a diesel additive to reduce levels of particulates, carbon monoxide, and hydrocarbons from diesel-powered vehicles.

=== Conventional biofuels (first generation) ===
First-generation biofuels (also denoted as "conventional biofuels") are made from food crops grown on arable land. The crop's sugar, starch, or oil content is converted into biodiesel or ethanol, using transesterification, or yeast fermentation.

=== Advanced biofuels ===
To avoid a "food versus fuel" dilemma, second-generation biofuels and third-generation biofuels (also called advanced biofuels or sustainable biofuels or drop-in biofuels) are made from feedstocks which do not directly compete with food or feed crop such as waste products and energy crops. A wide range of renewable residue feedstocks such as those derived from agriculture and forestry activities like rice straw, rice husk, wood chips, and sawdust can be used to produce advanced biofuels through biochemical and thermochemical processes.

The feedstock used to make the fuels either grow on arable land but are byproducts of the main crop, or they are grown on marginal land. Second-generation feedstocks include agricultural residues such as straw and bagasse, woody biomass, perennial grasses, waste vegetable oils and municipal solid waste. The availability and suitability of these materials vary according to the production process and local conditions.

Although advanced biofuels can be produced from feedstocks such as crop residues, dedicated energy crops and woody biomass, conventional feedstocks remain dominant in global production. The OECD-FAO Agricultural Outlook 2026–2035 projects that first-generation biofuels will continue to account for most production over the next decade, with ethanol relying mainly on maize and sugar crops and biomass-based diesel on vegetable oils. The report also identifies high investment costs as a challenge to the commercial expansion of advanced biofuels and sustainable aviation fuel.

== Types ==
=== Liquid ===
==== Ethanol ====
Biologically produced alcohols, most commonly ethanol, and less commonly propanol and butanol, are produced by the action of microorganisms and enzymes through the fermentation of sugars or starches (easiest to produce) or cellulose (more difficult to produce). The IEA estimates that ethanol production used 20% of sugar supplies and 13% of corn supplies in 2021.

Ethanol fuel is the most common biofuel worldwide, particularly in Brazil. Alcohol fuels are produced by fermentation of sugars derived from wheat, corn, sugar beets, sugar cane, molasses and any sugar or starch from which alcoholic beverages such as whiskey, can be made (such as potato and fruit waste, etc.). Production methods used are enzyme digestion (to release sugars from stored starches), fermentation of the sugars, distillation and drying. The distillation process requires significant energy input to generate heat. Heat is sometimes generated with unsustainable natural gas fossil fuel, but cellulosic biomass such as bagasse is the most common fuel in Brazil, while pellets, wood chips and also waste heat are more common in Europe. Corn-to-ethanol and other food stocks has led to the development of cellulosic ethanol. Ethanol fuel can be combined with gasoline to create a more environmentally friendly fuel though there are more viable substitutions to gasoline such as Butanol.

==== Other biofuels ====
Methanol is currently produced from natural gas, a non-renewable fossil fuel. In the future it is hoped to be produced from biomass as biomethanol. This is technically feasible, but the production is currently being postponed for concerns that the economic viability is still pending. The methanol economy is an alternative to the hydrogen economy to be contrasted with today's hydrogen production from natural gas.

Butanol (C_{4}H_{9}OH) is formed by ABE fermentation (acetone, butanol, ethanol) and experimental modifications of the process show potentially high net energy gains with biobutanol as the only liquid product. Biobutanol is often claimed to provide a direct replacement for gasoline, because it will produce more energy than ethanol and allegedly can be burned "straight" in existing gasoline engines (without modification to the engine or car), is less corrosive and less water-soluble than ethanol, and could be distributed via existing infrastructures. Escherichia coli strains have also been successfully engineered to produce butanol by modifying their amino acid metabolism. One drawback to butanol production in E. coli remains the high cost of nutrient rich media, however, recent work has demonstrated E. coli can produce butanol with minimal nutritional supplementation. Biobutanol is sometimes called biogasoline, which is incorrect as it is chemically different, being an alcohol and not a hydrocarbon like gasoline.

==== Biodiesel ====
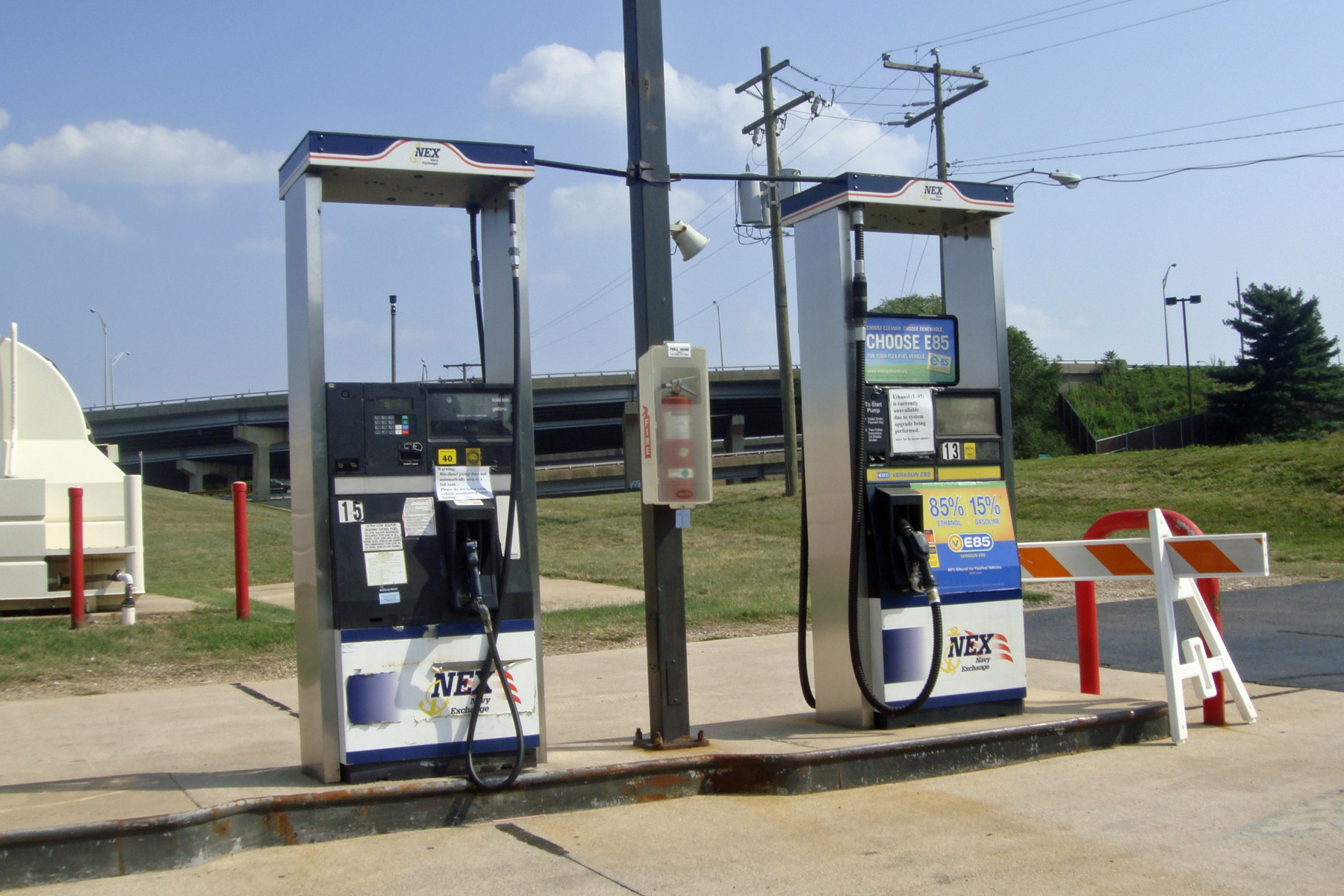
Biofuel pumps, 2010

Biodiesel is the most common biofuel in Europe. It is produced from oils or fats using transesterification and is a liquid similar in composition to fossil/mineral diesel. Chemically, it consists mostly of fatty acid methyl (or ethyl) esters (FAMEs). Feedstocks for biodiesel include animal fats, vegetable oils, soy, rapeseed, jatropha, mahua, mustard, flax, sunflower, palm oil, hemp, field pennycress, Pongamia pinnata and algae. The greenhouse gas emissions associated with biodiesel vary according to the feedstock and production process. A life-cycle assessment of biodiesel and renewable diesel production in the United States found that using soybean, canola and carinata oils could reduce life-cycle greenhouse gas emissions by 40% to 69% compared with petroleum diesel, after accounting for estimated land-use change emissions. Fuels produced from used cooking oil, animal fats and distillers corn oil achieved estimated reductions of 79% to 86% in the study.

As of 2020, researchers at Australia's CSIRO have been studying safflower oil as an engine lubricant, and researchers at Montana State University's Advanced Fuels Center in the US have been studying the oil's performance in a large diesel engine, with results described as a "breakthrough".

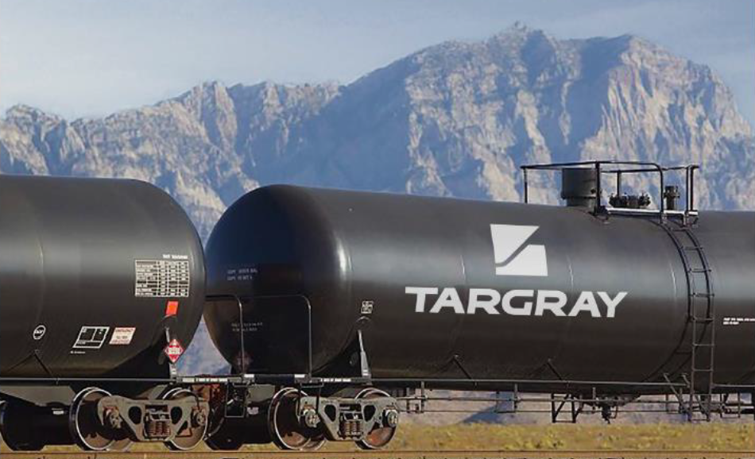
Targray Biofuels Division railcar transporting Biodiesel.

Biodiesel can be used in any diesel engine and modified equipment when mixed with mineral diesel. It can also be used in its pure form (B100) in diesel engines, but some maintenance and performance problems may occur during wintertime utilization, since the fuel becomes somewhat more viscous at lower temperatures, depending on the feedstock used.

Electronically controlled 'common rail' and 'Unit Injector' type systems from the late 1990s onwards can only use biodiesel blended with conventional diesel fuel. These engines have finely metered and atomized multiple-stage injection systems that are very sensitive to the viscosity of the fuel. Many current-generation diesel engines are designed to run on B100 without altering the engine itself, although this depends on the fuel rail design. Since biodiesel is an effective solvent and cleans residues deposited by mineral diesel, engine filters may need to be replaced more often, as the biofuel dissolves old deposits in the fuel tank and pipes. It also effectively cleans the engine combustion chamber of carbon deposits, helping to maintain efficiency.

Biodiesel is an oxygenated fuel, meaning it contains a reduced amount of carbon and higher hydrogen and oxygen content than fossil diesel. This improves the combustion of biodiesel and reduces the particulate emissions from unburnt carbon. However, using pure biodiesel may increase NO_{x}-emissions Biodiesel is also safe to handle and transport because it is non-toxic and biodegradable, and has a high flash point of about 300 °F (148 °C) compared to petroleum diesel fuel, which has a flash point of 125 °F (52 °C).

In many European countries, a 5% biodiesel blend is widely used and is available at thousands of gas stations. In France, biodiesel is incorporated at a rate of 8% in the fuel used by all French diesel vehicles. Avril Group produces under the brand Diester, a fifth of 11 million tons of biodiesel consumed annually by the European Union. It is the leading European producer of biodiesel.

==== Green diesel ====
Green diesel can be produced from a combination of biochemical and thermochemical processes. Conventional green diesel is produced through hydroprocessing biological oil feedstocks, such as vegetable oils and animal fats. Recently, it is produced using series of thermochemical processes such as pyrolysis and hydroprocessing. In the thermochemical route, syngas produced from gasification, bio-oil produced from pyrolysis or biocrude produced from hydrothermal liquefaction is upgraded to green diesel using hydroprocessing. Hydroprocessing is the process of using hydrogen to reform a molecular structure. For example, hydrocracking which is a widely used hydroprocessing technique in refineries is used at elevated temperatures and pressure in the presence of a catalyst to break down larger molecules, such as those found in vegetable oils, into shorter hydrocarbon chains used in diesel engines. Green diesel may also be called renewable diesel, drop-in biodiesel, hydrotreated vegetable oil (HVO fuel) or hydrogen-derived renewable diesel. Unlike biodiesel, green diesel has exactly the same chemical properties as petroleum-based diesel. It does not require new engines, pipelines or infrastructure to distribute and use, but has not been produced at a cost that is competitive with petroleum. Gasoline versions are also being developed. Green diesel is being developed in Louisiana and Singapore by ConocoPhillips, Neste Oil, Valero, Dynamic Fuels, and Honeywell UOP as well as Preem in Gothenburg, Sweden, creating what is known as Evolution Diesel.

==== Straight vegetable oil ====
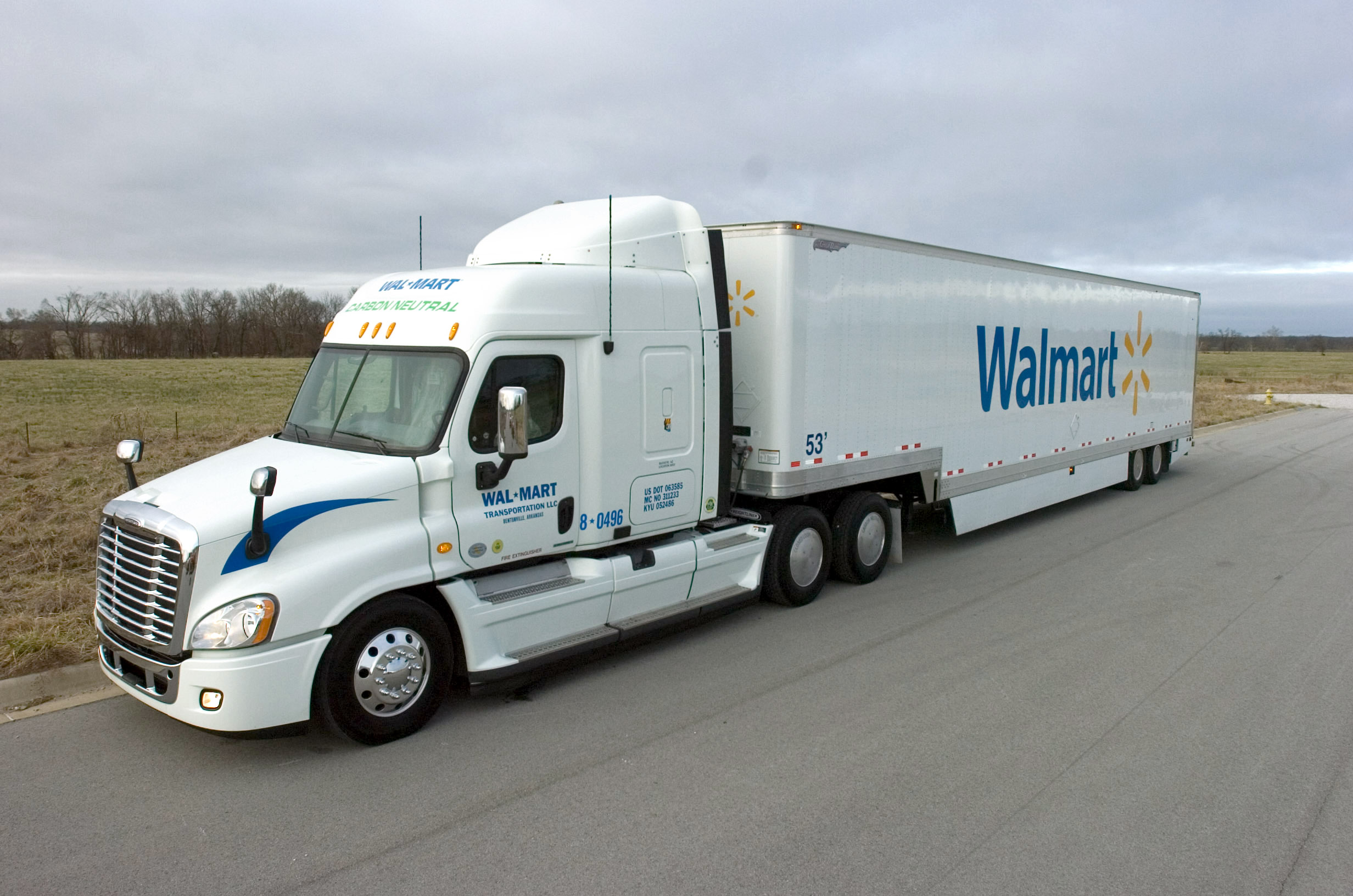
A biofuel truck in 2009

Straight unmodified edible vegetable oil is generally not used as fuel, but lower-quality oil has been used for this purpose. Used vegetable oil is increasingly being processed into biodiesel, or (more rarely) cleaned of water and particulates and then used as a fuel. The IEA estimates that biodiesel production used 17% of global vegetable oil supplies in 2021.

Oils and fats reacted with 10 pounds of a short-chain alcohol (usually methanol) in the presence of a catalyst (usually sodium hydroxide [NaOH] can be hydrogenated to give a diesel substitute. The resulting product is a straight-chain hydrocarbon with a high cetane number, low in aromatics and sulfur and does not contain oxygen. Hydrogenated oils can be blended with diesel in all proportions. They have several advantages over biodiesel, including good performance at low temperatures, no storage stability problems and no susceptibility to microbial attack.

==== Biogasoline ====
Biogasoline can be produced biologically and thermochemically. Using biological methods, a study led by Professor Lee Sang-yup at the Korea Advanced Institute of Science and Technology (KAIST) and published in the international science journal Nature used modified E. coli fed with glucose found in plants or other non-food crops to produce biogasoline with the produced enzymes. The enzymes converted the sugar into fatty acids and then turned these into hydrocarbons that were chemically and structurally identical to those found in commercial gasoline fuel. The thermochemical approach of producing biogasoline are similar to those used to produce biodiesel. Biogasoline may also be called drop-in gasoline or renewable gasoline.

==== Bioethers ====
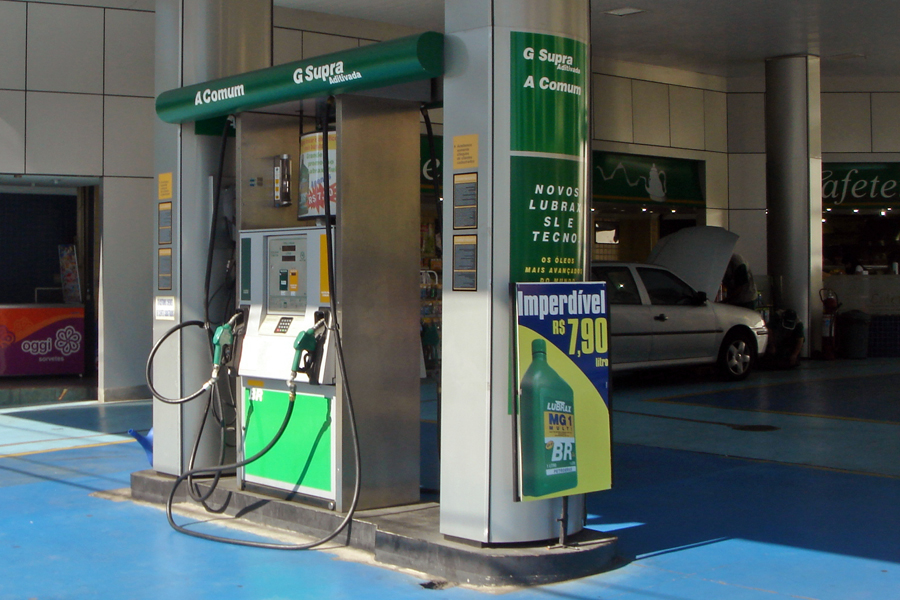
Neat ethanol on the left (A), gasoline on the right (G) at a filling station in Brazil in 2008

Bioethers (also referred to as fuel ethers or oxygenated fuels) are cost-effective compounds that act as octane rating enhancers. "Bioethers are produced by the reaction of reactive iso-olefins, such as iso-butylene, with bioethanol." Bioethers are created from wheat or sugar beets, and also be produced from the waste glycerol that results from the production of biodiesel. They also enhance engine performance, while significantly reducing engine wear and toxic exhaust emissions. By greatly reducing the amount of ground-level ozone emissions, they contribute to improved air quality. (Note: Council Directive 85/536/EEC of 5 December 1985 on crude-oil savings through the use of substitute fuel components in petrol. No longer in force, Date of end of validity: 31 December 1999; Repealed by 31998L0070.)

In transportation fuel there are six ether additives: dimethyl ether (DME), diethyl ether (DEE), methyl tert-butyl ether (MTBE), ethyl tert-butyl ether (ETBE), tert-amyl methyl ether (TAME), and tert-amyl ethyl ether (TAEE).

The European Fuel Oxygenates Association identifies MTBE and ETBE as the most commonly used ethers in fuel to replace lead. Ethers were introduced in Europe in the 1970s to replace the highly toxic compound. Although Europeans still use bioether additives, the U.S. Energy Policy Act of 2005 lifted a requirement for reformulated gasoline to include an oxygenate, leading to less MTBE being added to fuel. Although bioethers are likely to replace ethers produced from petroleum in the UK, it is highly unlikely they will become a fuel in and of itself due to the low energy density.

==== Aviation biofuel ====
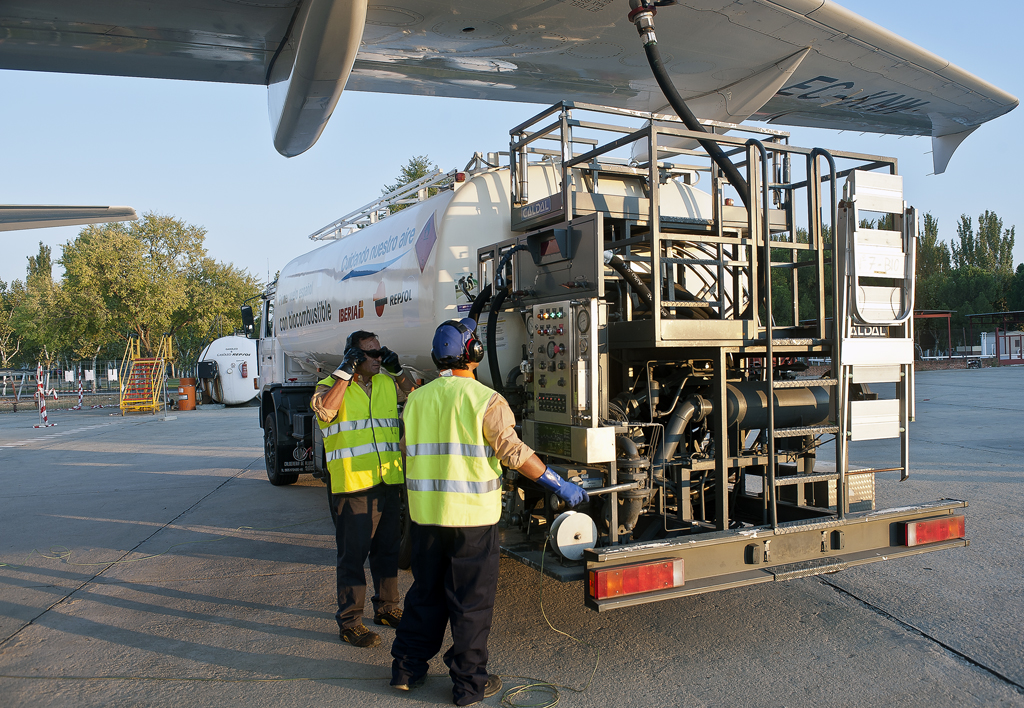
Refueling an Airbus A320 with biofuel in 2011

An aviation biofuel (also known as bio-jet fuel, bio-aviation fuel (BAF), semi-synthetic jet fuel, or sustainable aviation fuel (SAF)) is a biofuel used to power aircraft. The International Air Transport Association (IATA) considers it a key element in reducing the environmental impact of aviation. Aviation biofuel can be used to decarbonize otherwise hard-to-decarbonise medium and long-haul air travel via "drop-in-replacement" which does not require extensive modification to aircraft engine design. Synthetic paraffinic kerosene (SPK) refers to any non-petroleum-based hydrocarbon mixture designed as a blending component or complete replacement of kerosene jet fuel.

Not all bio-fuels are produced in a sustainable manner. Typically sustainable aviation fuel is certified as being sustainable by a third-party organisation and may benefit from emissions trading or carbon-credit schemes depending on local laws.

Biofuels are biomass-derived fuels from plants, animals, or waste; depending on which type of biomass is used, they could lower CO_{2} emissions by 20–98% compared to conventional jet fuel. The first test flight using blended biofuel was in 2008, and in 2011, blended fuels with 50% biofuels were allowed on commercial flights. In 2023 SAF production was 600 million liters, representing 0.2% of global jet fuel use. By 2024, SAF production was to increase to 1.3 billion liters (1 million tonnes), representing 0.3% of global jet fuel consumption and 11% of global renewable fuel production. This increase came as major US production facilities delayed their ramp-up until 2025, having initially been expected to reach 1.9 billion liters.

Aviation biofuel can be produced from upgraded plant or animal sources such as Jatropha, algae, tallows, waste oils, palm oil, Babassu, and Camelina (bio-SPK); from solid biomass using pyrolysis processed with a Fischer–Tropsch process (FT-SPK); with an alcohol-to-jet (ATJ) process from waste fermentation; or from synthetic biology through a solar reactor. Pathways which use electricity-derived hydrogen as a feedstock are called Electrofuels or e-fuels. Small piston engines can be modified to burn ethanol as a replacement for aviation gasoline.

SAF technology faces significant challenges due to feedstock constraints. The oils and fats used in production of hydrotreated esters and fatty acids (HEFA), crucial for SAF production, are in limited supply as demand increases. Although advanced e-fuels technology, which combines waste CO_{2} with clean hydrogen, presents a promising solution, it is still under development and comes with high costs. To overcome these issues, SAF developers are exploring more readily available feedstocks such as woody biomass and agricultural and municipal waste, aiming to produce lower-carbon jet fuel more sustainably and efficiently.

==== Marine biofuels ====
Biofuels are being investigated as alternatives to conventional marine fuels in the shipping industry. Biodiesel and biodiesel–alcohol blends have been studied as potential substitutes or blending components for marine gas oil. Potential feedstocks include non-edible vegetable oils, used cooking oil and microalgae. Their suitability for marine engines depends on fuel properties, engine compatibility and compliance with marine fuel standards.

=== Gaseous ===
==== Biogas and biomethane ====
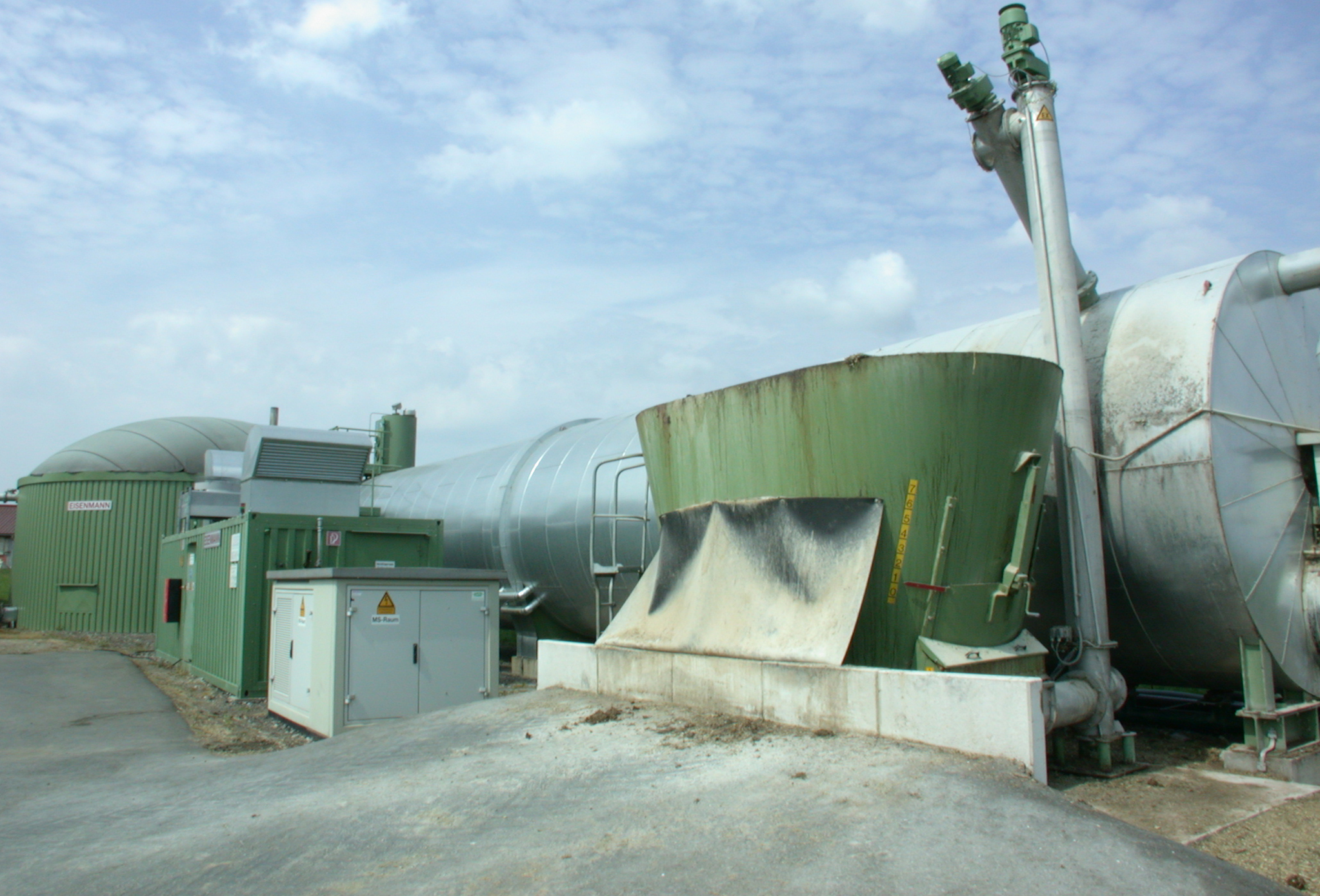
Biogas plant in 2007

Biogas is a mixture composed primarily of methane and carbon dioxide produced by the process of anaerobic digestion of organic material by micro-organisms. Other trace components of this mixture includes water vapor, hydrogen sulfide, siloxanes, hydrocarbons, ammonia, oxygen, carbon monoxide, and nitrogen. It can be produced either from biodegradable waste materials or by the use of energy crops fed into anaerobic digesters to supplement gas yields. The solid byproduct, digestate, can be used as a biofuel or a fertilizer. When CO_{2} and other impurities are removed from biogas, it is called biomethane. The CO_{2} can also be combined with hydrogen in methanation to form more methane.

Biogas can be recovered from mechanical biological treatment waste processing systems. Landfill gas, a less clean form of biogas, is produced in landfills through naturally occurring anaerobic digestion. If it escapes into the atmosphere, it acts as a greenhouse gas.

In Sweden, "waste-to-energy" power plants capture methane biogas from garbage and use it to power transport systems. Farmers can produce biogas from cattle manure via anaerobic digesters.

==== Syngas ====
Syngas, a mixture of carbon monoxide, hydrogen and various hydrocarbons, is produced by partial combustion of biomass (combustion with an amount of oxygen that is not sufficient to convert the biomass completely to carbon dioxide and water). Before partial combustion the biomass is dried and sometimes pyrolysed. Syngas is more efficient than direct combustion of the original biofuel; more of the energy contained in the fuel is extracted.

Syngas may be burned directly in internal combustion engines, turbines or high-temperature fuel cells. The wood gas generator, a wood-fueled gasification reactor, can be connected to an internal combustion engine.

Syngas can be used to produce methanol, dimethyl ether and hydrogen, or converted via the Fischer–Tropsch process to produce a diesel substitute, or a mixture of alcohols that can be blended into gasoline. Gasification normally relies on temperatures greater than 700 °C.

Lower-temperature gasification is desirable when co-producing biochar, but results in syngas polluted with tar.

=== Solid ===
The term "biofuels" is also used for solid fuels that are made from biomass, even though this is less common.

== Research into other types ==
=== Algae-based biofuels ===
Algae can be produced in ponds or tanks on land, and out at sea. Algal fuels have high yields, a high ignition point, can be grown with minimal impact on fresh water resources, can be produced using saline water and wastewater, and are biodegradable and relatively harmless to the environment if spilled. However, production requires large amounts of energy and fertilizer, the produced fuel degrades faster than other biofuels, and it does not flow well in cold temperatures.

Despite continued research, the commercial production of algae-based biofuels remains limited by economic and technical challenges. A 2026 review of algae-to-liquid biofuel technologies reported that algae production in Europe is still mainly directed towards higher-value markets such as food, animal feed and cosmetics, while biofuel applications remain at experimental and pilot scales. The main challenges include production costs, conversion efficiency and the energy requirements of cultivation and processing.

Third and fourth-generation biofuels also include biofuels that are produced by bioengineered organisms i.e. algae and cyanobacteria. Algae and cyanobacteria will use water, carbon dioxide, and solar energy to produce biofuels. This method of biofuel production is still at the research level. The biofuels that are secreted by the bioengineered organisms are expected to have higher photon-to-fuel conversion efficiency, compared to older generations of biofuels. One of the advantages of this class of biofuels is that the cultivation of the organisms that produce the biofuels does not require the use of arable land. The disadvantages include the cost of cultivating the biofuel-producing organisms being very high. Also, current methods of using algae often have worse environmental impacts than using other crops.

Recent research highlights that the transition to sustainable energy is reliant on the widespread adoption of third- and fourth-generation biofuels, which utilize non-food sources such as algae and incorporate advanced processes like artificial photosynthesis. These alternatives are essential for climate change mitigation because they significantly reduce the land-use competition and sustainability risks associated with earlier biofuel generations.

=== Electrofuels and solar fuels ===
Electrofuels and solar fuels may or may not be biofuels, depending on whether they contain biological elements. Electrofuels are made by storing electrical energy in the chemical bonds of liquids and gases. The primary targets are butanol, biodiesel, and hydrogen, but include other alcohols and carbon-containing gases such as methane and butane. A solar fuel is a synthetic chemical fuel produced from solar energy. Light is converted to chemical energy, typically by reducing protons to hydrogen, or carbon dioxide to organic compounds.

== Bio-digesters ==
An anaerobic digester, also known as a biodigester, is a system in which microorganisms break down organic matter in the absence of oxygen. It can process various materials, including animal manure, food waste, agricultural residues, fats, oils and wastewater solids. The process produces biogas, which consists mainly of methane and carbon dioxide, as well as digestate, a residual material that can be used as a soil amendment or fertilizer depending on its composition and treatment. The digestion process generally involves four stages: hydrolysis, acidogenesis, acetogenesis and methanogenesis. The processes involved in anaerobic respiration are hydrolysis, acidogenesis, acetogenesis, and methanogenesis.

== Extent of production and use ==
Biofuel production

Biofuel production by region

Global biofuel production was 81 Mtoe in 2017 which represented an annual increase of about 3% compared to 2010. In 2017, the US was the largest biofuel producer in the world producing 37 Mtoe, followed by Brazil and South America at 23 Mtoe and Europe (mainly Germany) at 12 Mtoe.

An assessment from 2017 found that: "Biofuels will never be a major transport fuel as there is just not enough land in the world to grow plants to make biofuel for all vehicles. It can however, be part of an energy mix to take us into a future of renewable energy."

Recent projections indicate that global biofuel demand will continue to grow over the next decade, although growth rates are expected to differ between regions. According to the OECD–FAO Agricultural Outlook 2026–2035, global biofuel demand is projected to increase by an average of 1.4% annually. Production growth is expected to be driven mainly by middle-income countries, particularly Brazil, Indonesia and India, where increasing transport demand and energy security policies support the expansion of biofuels.

In higher-income countries, growth is expected to be slower as the adoption of electric vehicles reduces demand for transport fuels. However, biomass-based diesel and sustainable aviation fuel are expected to remain important areas of development. The expansion of these fuels will depend partly on the availability of sustainable feedstocks, investment costs and government policies.

== Issues ==
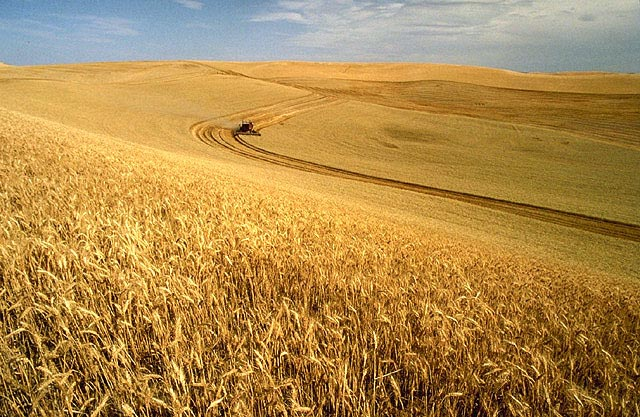
Wheat fields in the USA: wheat is grown for food but also for biofuel production.

Issues relating to biofuel are social, economic, environmental and technical problems that may arise from biofuel production and use. Social and economic issues include the "food vs fuel" debate and the need to develop responsible policies and economic instruments to ensure sustainable biofuel production. Farming for biofuels feedstock can be detrimental to the environment if not done sustainably. Environmental concerns include deforestation, biodiversity loss and soil erosion as a result of land clearing for biofuels agriculture. While biofuels can contribute to reduction in global carbon emissions, indirect land use change for biofuel production can have the inverse effect. Technical issues include possible modifications necessary to run the engine on biofuel, as well as energy balance and efficiency.

The International Resource Panel outlined the wider and interrelated factors that need to be considered when deciding on the relative merits of pursuing one biofuel over another. The IRP concluded that not all biofuels perform equally in terms of their effect on climate, energy security and ecosystems, and suggested that environmental and social effects need to be assessed throughout the entire life-cycle.

=== Environmental impacts ===
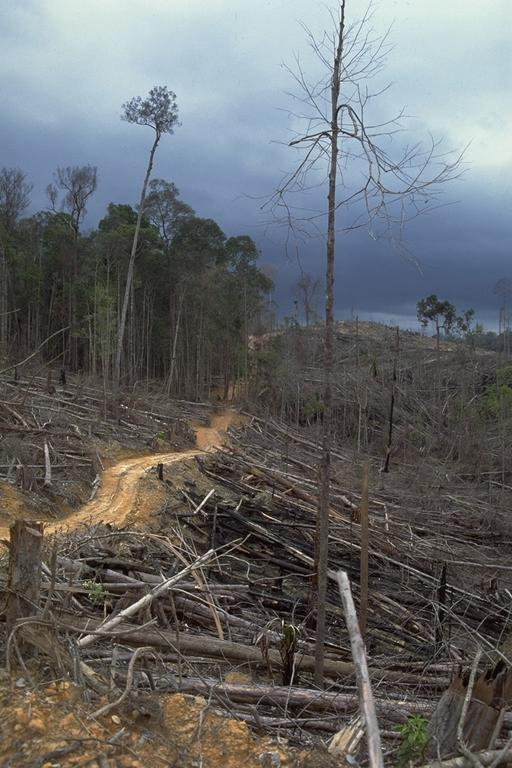
Deforestation in Indonesia, to make way for an oil palm plantation.

Estimates about the climate impact from biofuels vary widely based on the methodology and exact situation examined. Life-cycle analysis considers emissions from feedstock production and transportation, fuel production and distribution, and the use of the finished fuel.

Biofuels are not inherently carbon-neutral. Although carbon dioxide released during combustion may be partly offset by carbon absorbed during biomass growth, their overall greenhouse gas emissions also depend on feedstock production, processing, transportation and land-use changes. Depending on these factors, some biofuel pathways can have emissions comparable to or greater than those of fossil fuels. They can have greenhouse gas emissions ranging from as low as -127.1 gCO_{2}eq per MJ when carbon capture is incorporated into their production to those exceeding 95 gCO_{2}eq per MJ when land-use change is significant. Several factors are responsible for the variation in emission numbers of biofuel, such as feedstock and its origin, fuel production technique, system boundary definitions, and energy sources. However, many government policies, such as those by the European Union and the UK, require that biofuels have at least 65% greenhouse gas emissions savings (or 70% if it is renewable fuels of non-biological origins) relative to fossil fuels.

Life-cycle assessments of first-generation biofuels have shown large emissions associated with the potential land-use change required to produce additional biofuel feedstocks. If no land-use change is involved, first-generation biofuels can—on average—have lower emissions than fossil fuels. However, biofuel production can compete with food crop production. Up to 40% of corn produced in the United States is used to make ethanol and worldwide 10% of all grain is turned into biofuel. A 50% reduction in grain used for biofuels in the US and Europe would replace all of Ukraine's grain exports. Several studies have shown that reductions in emissions from biofuels are achieved at the expense of other impacts, such as acidification, eutrophication, water footprint and biodiversity loss.

Second-generation biofuels are thought to increase environmental sustainability since the non-food part of plants is being used to produce second-generation biofuels instead of being disposed of. But the use of second-generation biofuels increases the competition for lignocellulosic biomass, increasing the cost of these biofuels.

In theory, third-generation biofuels, produced from algae, shouldn't harm the environment more than first- or second-generation biofuels due to lower changes in land use and the fact that they do not require pesticide use for production. When looking at the data however, it has been shown that the environmental cost to produce the infrastructure and energy required for third generation biofuel production, are higher than the benefits provided from the biofuels use.

The European Commission has officially approved a measure to phase out palm oil-based biofuels by 2030. Unsustainable palm oil agriculture has caused significant environmental and social problems, including deforestation and pollution.

The production of biofuels can be very energy intensive, which, if generated from non-renewable sources, can heavily mitigate the benefits gained through biofuel use. A solution proposed to solve this issue is to supply biofuel production facilities with excess nuclear energy, which can supplement the power provided by fossil fuels. This can provide a carbon inexpensive solution to help reduce the environmental impacts of biofuel production.

=== Indirect land use change impacts of biofuels ===
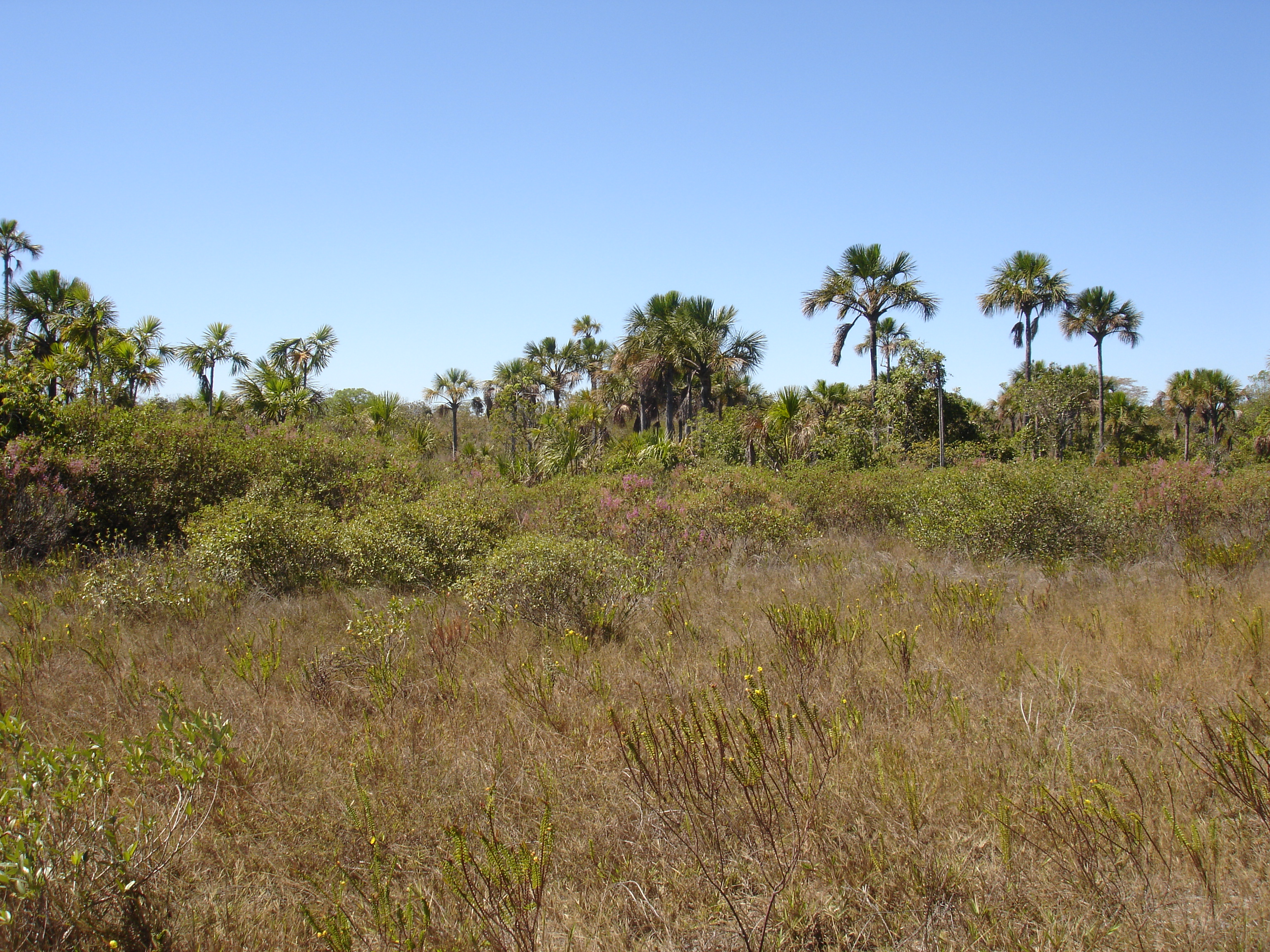
Brazilian cerrado

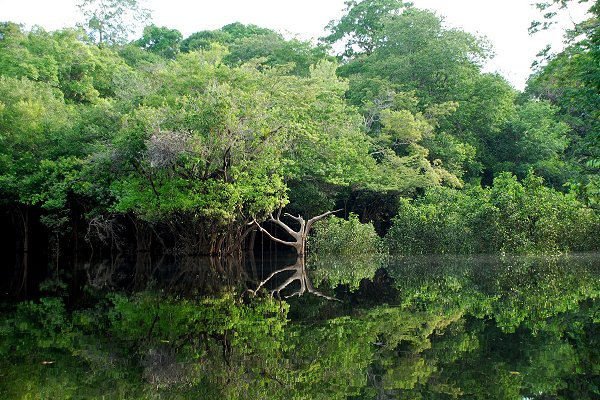
Amazon rainforest

The indirect land use change impacts of biofuels, also known as ILUC or iLUC (pronounced as i-luck), relates to the unintended consequence of releasing more carbon emissions due to land-use changes around the world induced by the expansion of croplands for ethanol or biodiesel production in response to the increased global demand for biofuels.

As farmers worldwide respond to higher crop prices in order to maintain the global food supply-and-demand balance, pristine lands are cleared to replace the food crops that were diverted elsewhere to biofuels' production. Because natural lands, such as rainforests and grasslands, store carbon in their soil and biomass as plants grow each year, clearance of wilderness for new farms translates to a net increase in greenhouse gas emissions. Due to this off-site change in the carbon stock of the soil and the biomass, indirect land use change has consequences in the greenhouse gas (GHG) balance of a biofuel.

Other authors have also argued that indirect land use changes produce other significant social and environmental impacts, affecting biodiversity, water quality, food prices and supply, land tenure, worker migration, and community and cultural stability.

== See also ==
- Aviation biofuel
- Bioenergy Europe
- BioEthanol for Sustainable Transport
- Biofuels by region
- Biofuels Center of North Carolina
- Biogas powerplant
- International Renewable Energy Agency
- List of biofuel companies and researchers
- List of vegetable oils used for biofuel
- Renewable energy by country
- Residue-to-product ratio
- Sustainable aviation fuel
- Sustainable transport
- Table of biofuel crop yields
