= Thorndale station =

Thorndale station may refer to:

- Thorndale station (CTA), a rapid transit station in Chicago, Illinois
- Thorndale station (SEPTA), a commuter rail station in Thorndale, Pennsylvania
- Thornton Dale railway station former station closed 1964
- Thornton Lane railway station former station closed 1865

== See also ==
- Thorndale (disambiguation)
