= Biofuels Center of North Carolina =

Defunct nonprofit biofuels organization in North Carolina

- Type: Nonprofit organization
- Industry: Biofuel
- Founded: 2007
- Defunct: 2013
- Headquarters: Oxford, North Carolina, U.S.

The Biofuels Center of North Carolina was a private, nonprofit organization headquartered in Oxford, North Carolina. Established in 2007 by the North Carolina General Assembly, the Center was created to implement North Carolina's Strategic Plan for Biofuels Leadership and promote the development of a statewide biofuels industry.

The Center's mission was to encourage the production of transportation fuels from locally grown biomass, reduce North Carolina's dependence on imported petroleum, and support economic development through biofuels research, commercialization, and industry partnerships. Its strategic plan called for 10 percent of North Carolina's transportation fuel demand—approximately 600 million US gallons (2,300,000 m^{3}) annually—to be supplied by in-state biomass by 2017.

The Center received an initial $5 million appropriation from the 2007 General Assembly and continued to receive state funding until 2013. In 2013, the General Assembly eliminated funding for the organization, which ceased operations later that year.

== History ==
The Biofuels Center of North Carolina was established in 2007 following legislation introduced by Representative Jim Crawford and Senator Charlie Albertson. Senate Bill 2051 directed the development of North Carolina's Strategic Plan for Biofuels Leadership, while House Bill 1990 served as companion legislation.

The strategic plan was developed with input from more than 70 representatives from agriculture, higher education, state government, nonprofit organizations, and industry. The Biofuels Center was created to implement the plan and encourage the development of a biofuels industry in North Carolina.

The General Assembly provided an initial appropriation of $5 million in 2007 and continued to fund the organization through annual appropriations. Additional funding was provided during the 2009–2010 fiscal year, including $4 million in federal American Recovery and Reinvestment Act funds administered through the North Carolina State Energy Office and the U.S. Department of Energy.

In 2013, the General Assembly eliminated state funding for the Biofuels Center. The organization ceased operations later that year.

== North Carolina's Strategic Plan for Biofuels Leadership ==
The Strategic Plan for Biofuels Leadership outlined a statewide strategy for developing a commercial biofuels industry in North Carolina. It established a goal of producing 10 percent of the state's transportation fuel from locally produced biomass by 2017 and identified nine broad strategies, including research and development, feedstock production, workforce development, commercialization, and legislative support.

The plan sought to reduce the state's dependence on imported petroleum while promoting rural economic development and advancing biofuels research.

== Programs ==
The Biofuels Center of North Carolina coordinated research, demonstration, and commercialization efforts intended to develop a statewide biofuels industry. Its programs focused on lignocellulosic feedstocks, woody biomass, energy crops, advanced biofuel technologies, and supply chain development. The Center worked with universities, community colleges, state agencies, private industry, and economic development organizations to advance research, workforce development, and commercialization of biofuels technologies.

The Center administered competitive grant programs supporting research, feedstock evaluation, technology development, and commercialization projects across North Carolina. According to its 2012 report to the General Assembly, the organization had supported 109 peer-reviewed grants and Center projects since its creation.

In addition to research funding, the Center sponsored educational initiatives, technical workshops, and public outreach programs, including online educational resources intended to support the growth of North Carolina's biofuels industry.

== Closure and legacy ==
In 2013, the North Carolina General Assembly eliminated funding for the Biofuels Center as part of the state budget. The organization ceased operations later that year, and its Oxford headquarters was returned to the North Carolina Department of Agriculture and Consumer Services.

The former Biofuels Campus continues to operate as part of the Oxford Tobacco Research Station. According to the North Carolina Department of Agriculture and Consumer Services, the former USDA laboratories served as the headquarters of the Biofuels Center from 2007 until operations ceased in 2013. The station now houses the North Carolina Bioenergy Research Initiative and continues to support agricultural and bioenergy research.

== See also ==
- Biofuel
- Cellulosic ethanol
- Biomass
- Energy crop
- North Carolina Biotechnology Center
- North Carolina Department of Agriculture and Consumer Services
