= Joseph B. Littlejohn House =

Historic house in North Carolina, United States

- U.S. National Register of Historic Places
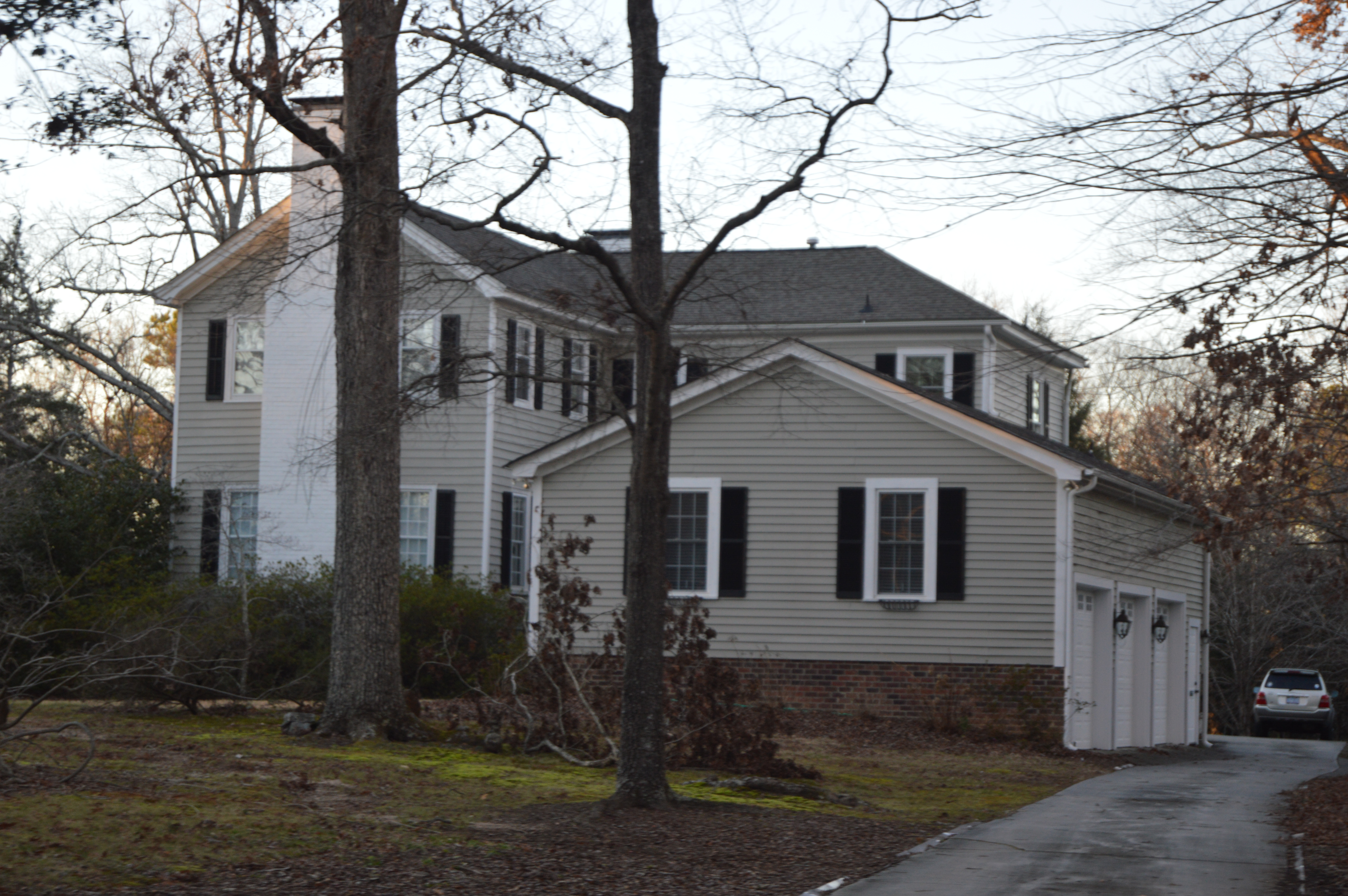
- Non-historic garage, on southern side of the house

- Location within North Carolina Location within the United States
- Location: High St., Oxford, North Carolina
- Coordinates: 36°18′43″N 78°34′49″W
- Area: 3.1 acres (1.3 ha)
- Built: 1820
- Architectural style: Georgian, Federal, Trans. Georgian/Federal
- MPS: Granville County MPS
- NRHP reference No.: 88001268
- Added to NRHP: August 31, 1988

Joseph B. Littlejohn House is a historic home located at Oxford, Granville County, North Carolina built between about 1820 and 1832. Originally the residence of Anna Maria and Joseph Blount Littlejohn, it is a two-story, five-bay, transitional Federal / Georgian style heavy timber frame dwelling.

William A. Devin (1871–1959) lived in the house as a child, and Frank William Bullock Jr. owned it during the 1970s and early 1980s. It was listed on the National Register of Historic Places in 1988.
