= Lumberton Normal School =

Former school in North Carolina

Lumberton Normal School was established in Lumberton, North Carolina. It was eventually renamed Whitin Normal School. The school trained teachers for "colored schools".

D. P. Allen taught at the school for about 3 decades as did five of his 9 children who became teachers. By 1882 it was reported the school's name was changed to Whitin Normal School. In 1898 it was reported to have 81 students.

The school closed after Allen's death.

== Alumni ==
- George Henry White, U.S. Congressman
- Professor Wesley Jones of Burgaw, North Carolina
