= R. S. Taylor =

North Carolina reconstruction era American politician

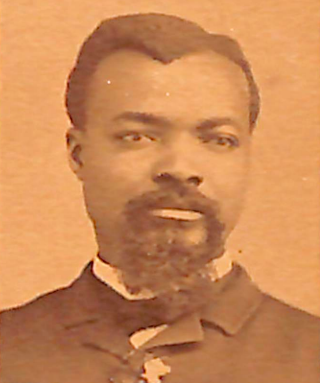
- Taylor (c. 1887)

Member of the North Carolina Senate
- In office 1885–1888

Personal details
- Party: Republican (while serving)

R. S. Taylor was a post Reconstruction era politician in North Carolina who served in the North Carolina Senate from 1885 to 1888 representing Edgecombe County.

He became a justice of the peace September 1, 1873.

He was a Democrat and served as the liberal executive committee chairman for Edgecombe in 1882. However, by 1884 when he was listed as a Republican and was a speaker at republican meetings in Edgecombe.

Taylor was first elected to the senate in 1885 serving the 5th district for Edgecombe as a republican. He was one of two black senators in the 1885 session along with George Henry White. He was described at the time in The Tarborough Southerner as a Jamaican carpetbagger. He was elected for a second term to serve 1887 and 1888. In March 1887 he gave a speech on disfranchisement and put forward a bill to address the issue.

== See also ==
- African American officeholders from the end of the Civil War until before 1900
