= Paschall–Daniel House =

Historic farm in North Carolina, United States

- U.S. National Register of Historic Places
- U.S. Historic district
- Nearest city: Oxford, North Carolina
- Area: 7.2 acres (2.9 ha)
- Built: c. 1855
- Architectural style: Greek Revival
- MPS: Granville County MPS
- NRHP reference No.: 88001263
- Added to NRHP: June 4, 1992

Paschall–Daniel House is a historic tobacco plantation complex and national historic district located at Oxford, Granville County, North Carolina, US. It was built about 1855, and is a two-story, three-bay, T-shaped Greek Revival style timber frame dwelling. It has a low hipped roof and two-story rear ell. Also on the property are the contributing milking house, garage, frame barn, milking barn, wood house, chicken house, and a log tobacco barn.

It was listed on the National Register of Historic Places in 1988.
