= Henry P. Cheatham =

American politician (1857–1935)

Henry Plummer Cheatham
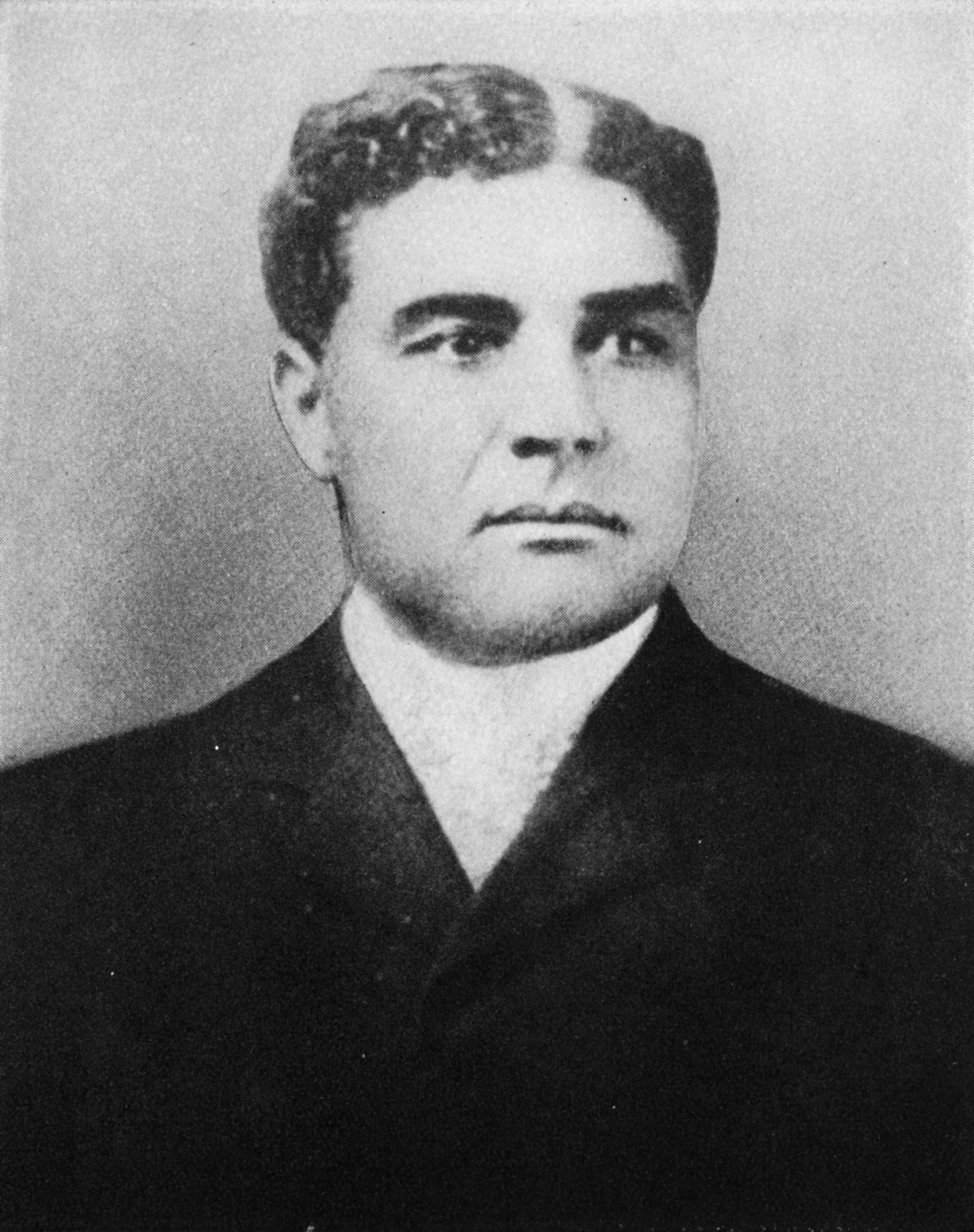

Member of the U.S. House of Representatives from North Carolina's 2nd district
- In office March 4, 1889 – March 3, 1893
- Preceded by: Furnifold Simmons
- Succeeded by: Frederick A. Woodard

Personal details
- Born: December 27, 1857 near Henderson, Granville County, North Carolina, U.S. (now Vance County, North Carolina)
- Died: November 29, 1935 (aged 77) Oxford, North Carolina, U.S.
- Party: Republican
- Spouse(s): 1st: Louisa Cherry; 2nd: Laura Joyner

Henry Plummer Cheatham (December 27, 1857 – November 29, 1935) was an educator, farmer and politician, elected as a Republican member of the United States House of Representatives from 1889 to 1893 from North Carolina. He was one of only five African Americans elected to Congress from the South in the Jim Crow era of the last decade of the nineteenth century, as disfranchisement reduced black voting. After that, no African Americans would be elected from the South until 1972 and none from North Carolina until 1992.

== Early life ==
Born into slavery in 1857 in what is now Henderson, North Carolina, Cheatham had an enslaved mother and a white father who was rumored to be a prominent local man during the 1850s.

After the Civil War and emancipation, he attended the first public schools for black children in Vance County, established by the state legislature in the Reconstruction era. With the financial aid of a white friend, Robert A. Jenkins, Cheatham attended Shaw University, a historically black college in Raleigh, North Carolina, where he graduated in 1883.

He worked briefly as a school principal before being elected as the Register of Deeds for Vance County (1884–1888), which was majority black and Republican. In this period, the Democrats had regained control of the state legislature, but many blacks continued to be elected to local office, as the state was more than 30% black.

== Marriage and family ==
In 1884, Cheatham married Louisa (or Louise) Cherry, who had been a fellow student at Shaw. She taught music at the school where he had been principal. They had three children: Charles, Mamie, and Henry Plummer Jr. Her sister Cora Lee Cherry married George Henry White in 1886, who also became active in politics and was elected as a U.S. Congressman after Cheatham had served. The proposed Cheatham-White Scholarship program, intended for North Carolina A&T State University and North Carolina Central University students, is named for both congressmen.

After Louisa Cheatham died in 1899, Henry married Laura Joyner. They also had three children: Susie, Richard, and James.

== Political career ==
Cheatham became active in Republican politics. He encouraged the establishment of institutions for African Americans, such as the Colored Orphan Asylum in Oxford in 1883 and the founding of state normal schools for the training of black teachers.

=== U.S. Congressman ===
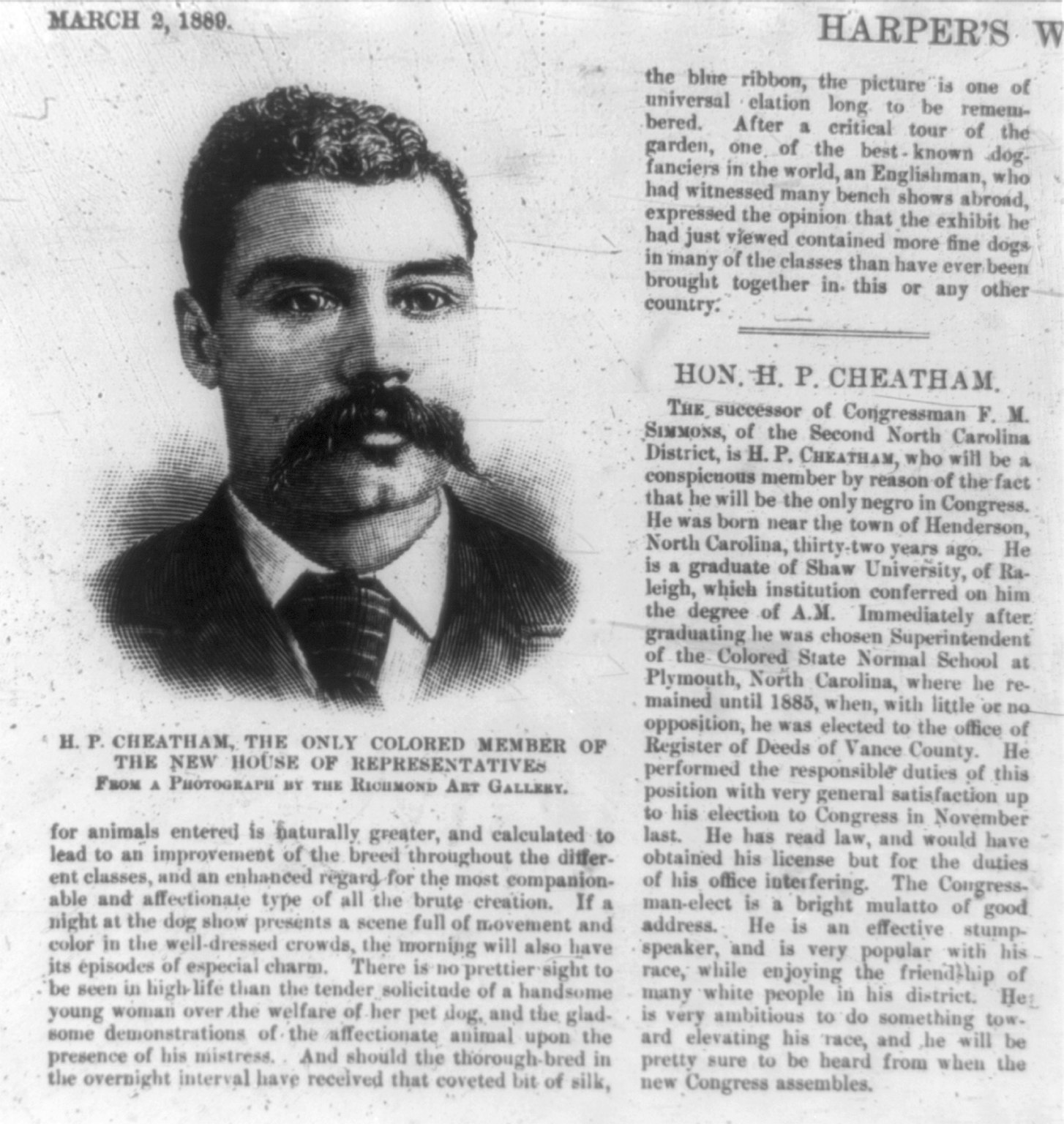
Clipping from Harper's Weekly, March 2, 1889

In 1888, Cheatham was narrowly elected to Congress from North Carolina's 2nd congressional district over the incumbent Furnifold M. Simmons. (Simmons would later lead the white supremacy campaigns that resulted in a new state constitution that disfranchised black citizens.) During the campaign, Cheatham was reported by North Carolina papers to have allegedly told black voters that Simmons and President Grover Cleveland would re-enslave them. Other press outlets of the time dismissed these allegations by the press as hyperbole or having misrepresented Cheatham's words.

In a period of disfranchisement of blacks in the South, Cheatham was one of five African Americans elected to Congress during the Jim Crow era of the late nineteenth century. There were two from South Carolina, his brother-in-law George Henry White, who followed him from North Carolina, and one from Virginia. After them, no African Americans would be elected from the South until 1972, after federal civil rights legislation enforcing constitutional rights for citizens, and no African American would be elected to Congress from North Carolina until 1992.

Cheatham, then the only black North Carolina congressman, supported federal aid to education, and the McKinley tariff. He also supported the Federal Elections Bill in 1890, introduced by Henry Cabot Lodge, to provide federal enforcement to safeguard the voting rights of African Americans in the South. House Republicans had been concerned about the discriminatory practices of the Democrats and trying to gain passage of a bill since the 1880s. Lodge's bill narrowly passed the House but died in the Senate. Republicans were unable to get federal legislation passed on this issue as the Southern Democratic voting block became more powerful.

Cheatham tended mostly to the needs of his constituents (of both races) but did not succeed in getting his own bills passed. Cheatham served on the House committees on Education, Expenditures on Public Buildings, and Agriculture, one of the more powerful.

In 1890, Cheatham defended his seat and defeated the Democrat James M. Mewborne, with 16,943 votes to 15,713. But nationwide, Democrats re-took the House of Representatives, which meant that measures to protect black civil rights would not be passed. Cheatham was the only black congressman in the Fifty-second Congress (he also had been the only black congressman in the first half of the 51st Congress).

He unsuccessfully sought re-election to a third term in 1892, after the North Carolina legislature changed the boundaries of his congressional district. Competition from a Populist on the ballot split some of the vote, contributing to the victory of Frederick A. Woodard, a Democrat.

Cheatham ran against Woodard again in 1894 without success. In 1896, he competed for the Republican nomination for the district against his brother-in-law, George Henry White, who won as the next (and last) late nineteenth-century black congressman from North Carolina.

== Later life ==
In 1897, President William McKinley's administration appointed Cheatham as federal Recorder of Deeds for the District of Columbia, a prestigious and lucrative patronage position which he held through 1901 and the change in administrations. Cheatham, a friend and ally of Booker T. Washington, was criticized for standing by McKinley, as the Republican administration did little to offset the rising tide of Jim Crow racism and segregation in the South. New state constitutions were passed in the South from 1890 to 1908 that disfranchised black citizens for more than half a century, but their provisions generally survived US Supreme Court review. If one provision was declared unconstitutional, Southern states passed new ones to create new obstacles.

After four years in Washington, D.C., Cheatham returned to farm in Littleton, North Carolina.

He moved to Oxford when appointed as superintendent of the state Colored Orphan Asylum, which was located there. He served in that position for 28 years. Cheatham had supported the state legislation to establish the orphanage in 1883, as part of Reconstruction-era programs to provide for the welfare of people. He "was its superintendent and to him more than any man, is due the credit for the remarkable progress and development of the institution." He died in Oxford in 1935.

Known as an educated, discreet, and diplomatic man, Cheatham impressed even the white-supremacist Democrat Josephus Daniels. He said that he regarded Cheatham highly as a man who had gained the confidence of both races.

== See also ==
- Disfranchisement after Reconstruction era
- List of African-American United States representatives

U.S. House of Representatives
Preceded by Furnifold M. Simmons	Member of the U.S. House of Representatives from North Carolina's 2nd congressional district 1889–1893	Succeeded by Frederick A. Woodard
