= Oxford, North Carolina =

- Town
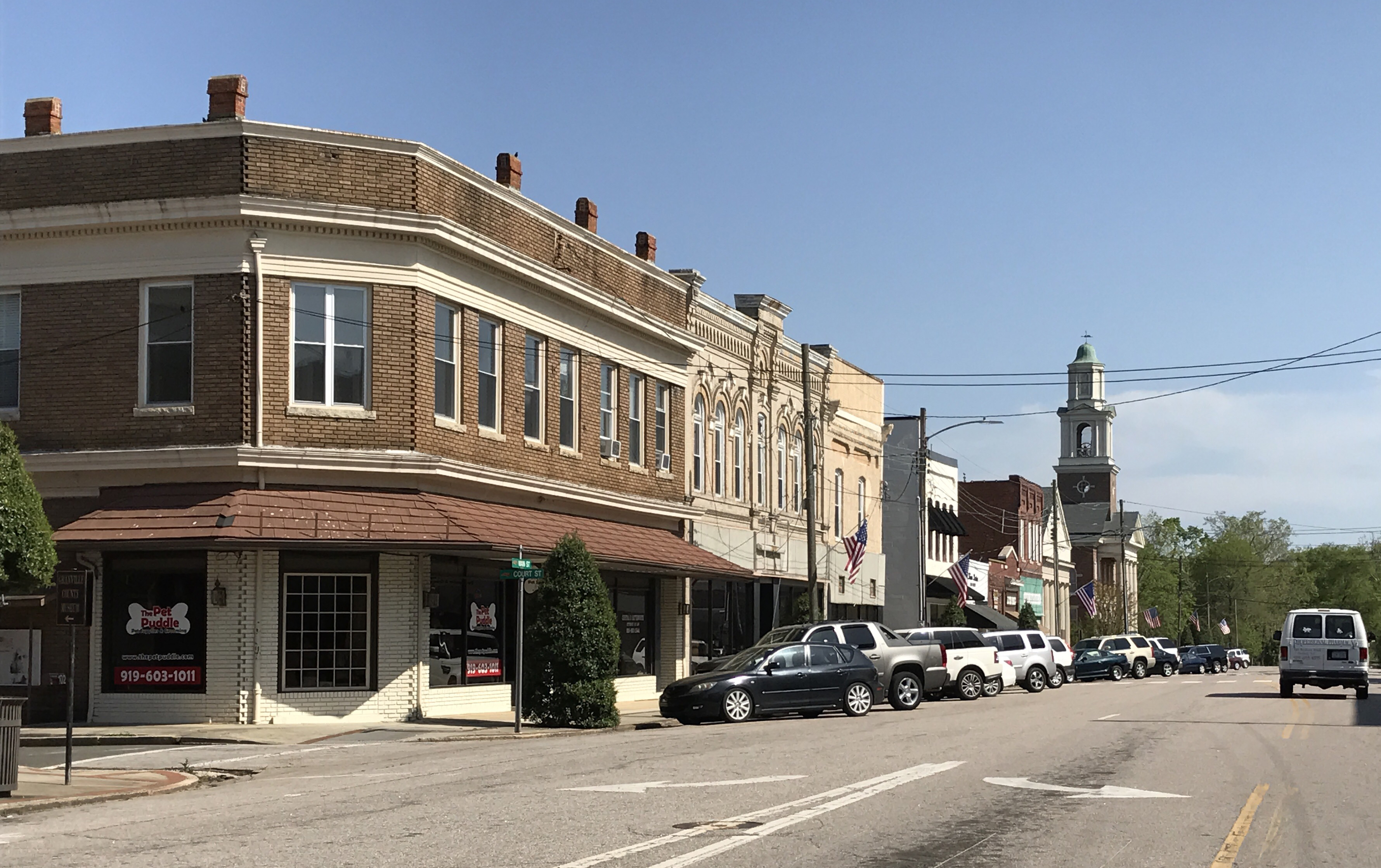
- Main Street

- Flag Seal
- Motto: "Historic, Walkable, Friendly"
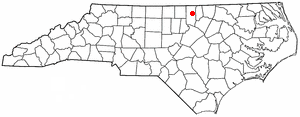
- Location of Oxford, North Carolina
- Coordinates: 36°18′56″N 78°35′05″W
- Country: United States
- State: North Carolina
- County: Granville
- Founded: 1811
- Incorporated: 1816
- Named for: A plantation owned by Samuel Benton and Oxford, England

Government
  - Mayor: Guillermo Nurse (Ind.)

Area
  - Total: 6.24 sq mi (16.15 km^{2})
  - Land: 6.23 sq mi (16.14 km^{2})
  - Water: 0.0039 sq mi (0.01 km^{2})
- Elevation: 449 ft (137 m)

Population (2020)
  - Total: 8,628
  - Density: 1,384.5/sq mi (534.54/km^{2})
- Time zone: UTC−5 (Eastern (EST))
  - Summer (DST): UTC−4 (EDT)
- ZIP code: 27565
- Area code: 919
- FIPS code: 37-49800
- GNIS feature ID: 2404455
- Website: www.oxfordnc.org

Oxford is a town in Granville County, North Carolina, North Carolina, United States, with a population of 8,628 as of the 2020 census. It is the county seat of Granville County.

== History ==
The town's history dates to 1761, when local legislator Samuel Benton built a plantation home and called it "Oxford." The legislature ordered the area around his plantation to be the seat of Granville County. The town was not incorporated until 1816.

The first Masonic orphanage for children in the United States was built in Oxford. It was originally established as St. John's College in 1858. The college ceased operations shortly after opening, however. In 1872 the community decided that the property should be repurposed to educate disadvantaged populations. In December 1873 the first residents were admitted to the Oxford Orphans Asylum, which is today known as the "Masonic Home for Children at Oxford."

In 1851 James H. Horner established Horner Military School, which enrolled many young men from New York, Pennsylvania, Virginia, South Carolina and other states. Many of the students went on to become leaders in the United States government, such as James Crawford Biggs, Solicitor General under President Franklin D. Roosevelt at the inception of the New Deal. After the barracks were destroyed by a fire in 1913, the school relocated to Charlotte, North Carolina.

The Oxford Female College was established in 1850 by North Carolina Baptists. After suffering financial difficulties, the college was sold and became a private educational institution renamed "Oxford Female Seminary." In 1880 F. P. Hobgood took over leadership of the school, and it gained popularity under his leadership. The school closed in 1925, following Hobgood's death the previous year.

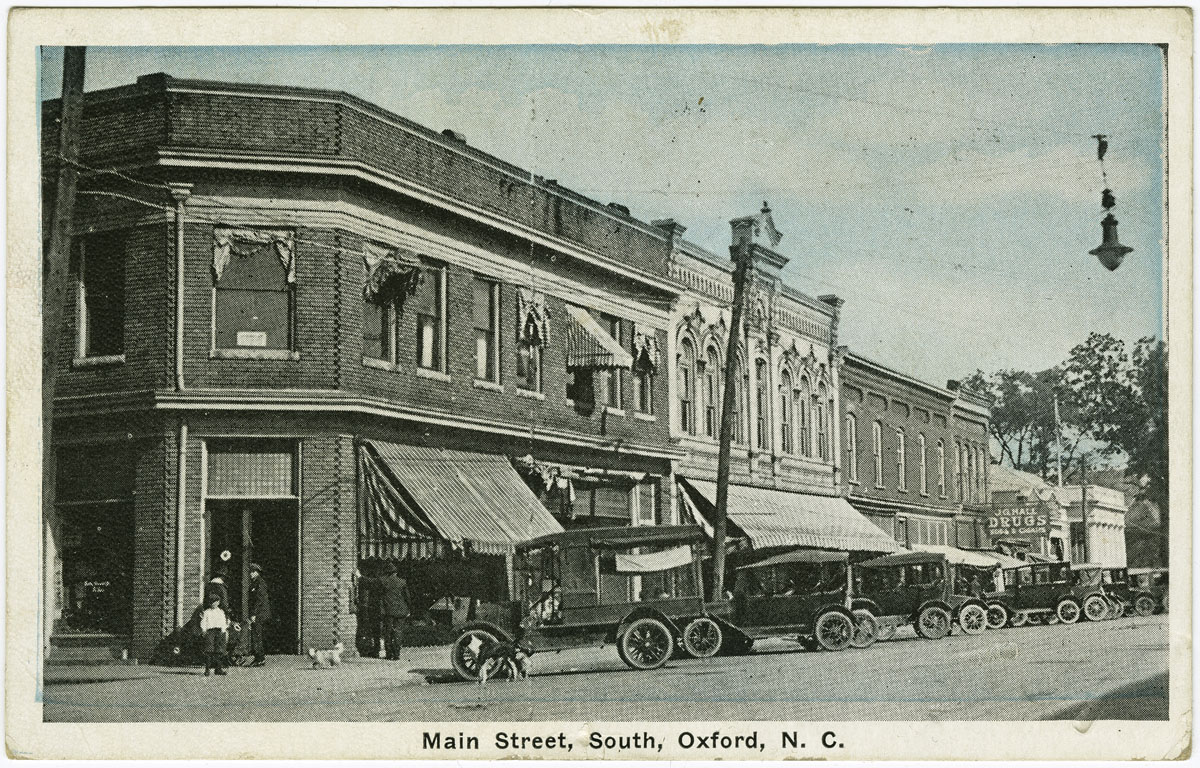
Oxford c. 1925

In 1883 the state legislature established the Colored Orphan Asylum in Oxford. Henry Plummer Cheatham, a former U.S. congressman (1889-1893), was appointed as superintendent in the early 1900s and led the institution for 28 years.

In 1970, Henry Marrow was shot and killed in Oxford. The killing resulted in a racial protest. The events were chronicled by Timothy Tyson in the book Blood Done Sign My Name (2004) and a 2010 movie with the same name.

A Confederate statue was erected in 1909 by the Granville Grays United Daughters of the Confederacy at a cost of $3000.00 and valued in 2009 at $1,327,791.62. The monument was erected in the courthouse square facing away from the courthouse. The base, constructed of granite from Warren County, is 27 feet (8.2 m) tall, and the bronze statue is 7 feet (2.1 m) tall. The monument, a memorial to the Confederate veterans of Granville County that served in the Civil War in the Granville Grays Company D, 12th Regiment, was dedicated October 30, 1909. The statue had not arrived in time but the ceremony continued and the statue was placed at a later date.

Following the 1970 Oxford protests, the city moved the monument from the courthouse square to a site in front of the Richard H. Thornton Library. Since 2009, some activists had suggested moving it to an historic graveyard located down the street. In June 2020 the statue was removed and is currently in storage.

The Central Orphanage, Granville County Courthouse, Joseph B. Littlejohn House, Locust Lawn, Oxford Historic District, Paschall-Daniel House, Archibald Taylor Plantation House, and Thorndale are listed on the National Register of Historic Places.

In 2023, Guillermo Nurse was elected mayor of Oxford, becoming North Carolina's first Latino mayor, and the first Black mayor of Oxford.

== Geography ==
Interstate 85 crosses the southeastern edge of the town, with access from Exits 202, 204, and 206; I-85 leads southwest 29 miles (47 km) to Durham and northeast 100 miles (160 km) to Petersburg, Virginia. U.S. Route 15 passes through the center of Oxford as Lewis Street, Hillsboro Street, and College Street, leading southwest 14 miles (23 km) to Creedmoor and north 23 miles (37 km) to Clarksville, Virginia. U.S. Route 158 bypasses Oxford on the northern side, leading east 12 miles (19 km) to Henderson and west 25 miles (40 km) to Roxboro.

According to the United States Census Bureau, Oxford has a total area of 6.1 square miles (15.7 km^{2}), all land.

Oxford contains three voting precincts in Granville County: Credle, East Oxford, and South Oxford.

== Demographics ==
Historical population
Census	Pop.	Note	%±
1850	669		—
1860	878		31.2%
1870	916		4.3%
1880	1,349		47.3%
1890	2,907		115.5%
1900	2,059		−29.2%
1910	3,018		46.6%
1920	3,606		19.5%
1930	4,101		13.7%
1940	3,991		−2.7%
1950	6,685		67.5%
1960	6,978		4.4%
1970	7,178		2.9%
1980	7,709		7.4%
1990	7,913		2.6%
2000	8,338		5.4%
2010	8,461		1.5%
2020	8,628		2.0%
2021 (est.)	8,775		1.7%
U.S. Decennial Census

=== 2020 census ===
Oxford racial composition
Race	Number	Percentage
White (non-Hispanic)	3,006	34.84%
Black or African American (non-Hispanic)	4,685	54.30%
Native American	17	0.20%
Asian	86	1.00%
Pacific Islander	3	0.03%
Other/Mixed	269	3.12%
Hispanic or Latino	562	6.51%

As of the 2020 United States census, there were 8,628 people, 3,454 households, and 2,235 families residing in the city.

=== 2010 census ===
As of the census of 2010, there were 8,461 people in 3,410 households in the town. The population density was 1,880.2 inhabitants per square mile (725.9/km^{2}). There were 3,771 housing units at an average density of 838.0 per square mile (323.6/km^{2}). The racial composition of the town was: 55.6% Black or African American, 38.6% White, 1.1% Asian American, 0.4% Native American, 2.5% Other, and 1.8% two or more races. 4.8% of the population identified as Hispanic or Latino American

There were 3,410 households, out of which 26.3% had children under the age of 18 living with them. The average household size was 2.48. In the town, the age distribution of the population was spread out, with 23.4% under the age of 18, 8.8% from 18 to 24, 10.6% from 25 to 34, 18.1% from 35 to 49, 19.7% from 50 to 64, and 19.4% who were 65 years of age or older. For every 100 females, there were 79.4 males.

The median income for a household in the town was $32,050 and the mean income was $48,293. The median and mean income for a family was $49,787 and $62,355, respectively. The per capita income for the town was $20,729. About 16.9% of families were at or below the poverty line, including 38.6% of those under age 18 and 19.3% of those age 65 or over. Of the total town population, 20.6% were at or below the poverty line.

== Economy ==
Oxford is home to Revlon's largest manufacturing facility, as well as its IT/IS department. CertainTeed has a roofing supplies plant in the city, Bailey Farms Inc Chile Pepper Grower & Distributor, Macra Lace Textiles, Shalag nonwoven hygienic fabrics, Gate Precast Concrete, Ideal Zipper, AWNC Toyota transmission manufacturing, Masonic Home for Children, and Biofuels Center of North Carolina are located in Oxford.

== Notable people ==
- Tiny Broadwick, parachutist pioneer
- Benjamin Chavis, civil rights activist
- Henry Plummer Cheatham, US congressman (1889-1893) representing North Carolina's 2nd district
- Hannah Cifers, mixed martial artist
- Margaret Currin, lawyer
- Franklin Wills Hancock Jr., Democratic member of the U.S. House of Representatives
- Isaiah Hicks, basketball player with the North Carolina Tar Heels
- Junius Horner, Episcopal bishop
- Martha Hunt, model
- Clayton McCullough, Manager of the Miami Marlins
- Ed Meadows, NFL defensive end, All-American at Duke
- Lee Meadows, pitcher for 1925 World Series champion Pittsburgh Pirates
- Richard Moore, North Carolina State Treasurer
- Ayesha Rascoe, American journalist for NPR.
- Marshall L. Shepard, Pennsylvania politician and clergyman
- Thad Stem, Jr., poet, author, newspaper columnist
- Hiram Tarkington (1896–1996), United States Army officer
- Abraham Watkins Venable (1799 – 1876), politician
- James E. Webb, administrator of NASA who guided the US lunar landing thrust

== Schools ==
- C. G. Credle Elementary School
- J.F. Webb High School
- J.F. Webb High School of Health and Life Sciences
- Joe Toler-Oak Hill Elementary School
- Mary Potter Middle School
- Northern Granville Middle School
- West Oxford Elementary School
- Oxford Preparatory School
