= Thorndale (Oxford, North Carolina) =

Historic house in North Carolina, United States

- U.S. National Register of Historic Places
- U.S. Historic district
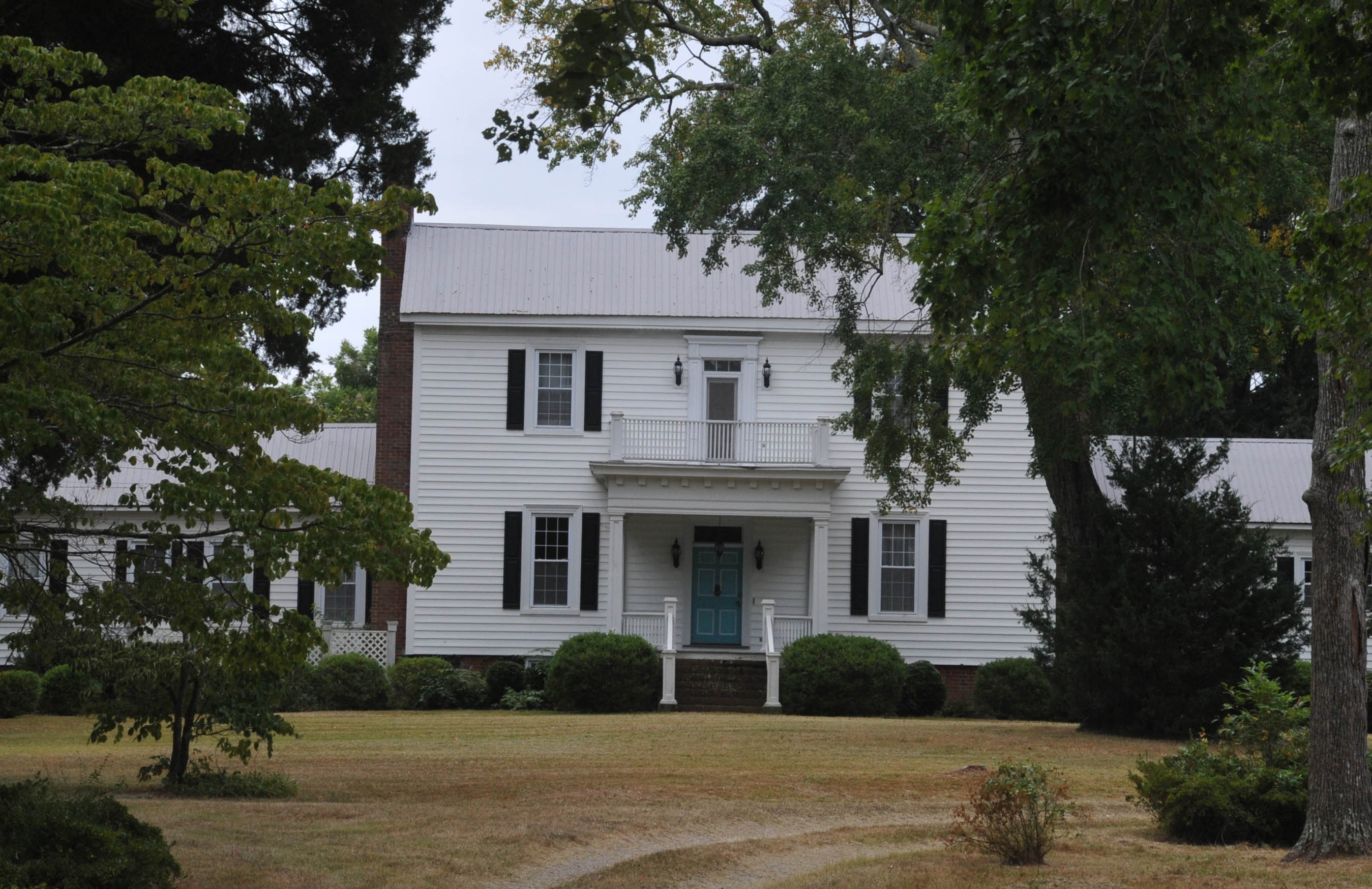
- Thorndale, March 2007

- Location within North Carolina Location within the United States
- Location: 213 W. Thorndale Dr., Oxford, North Carolina
- Coordinates: 36°18′12″N 78°36′23″W
- Area: 13 acres (5.3 ha)
- Built: 1837
- Architectural style: Georgian, Federal
- MPS: Granville County MPS
- NRHP reference No.: 88000413
- Added to NRHP: April 28, 1988

Thorndale is a historic plantation house and national historic district located near Oxford, Granville County, North Carolina. It was built in about 1837, and is a two-story, three-bay, heavy timber frame dwelling with Georgian / Federal style design elements.

It was listed on the National Register of Historic Places in 1988.
