= Moses Rountree House =

Historic house in North Carolina, United States

- U.S. National Register of Historic Places
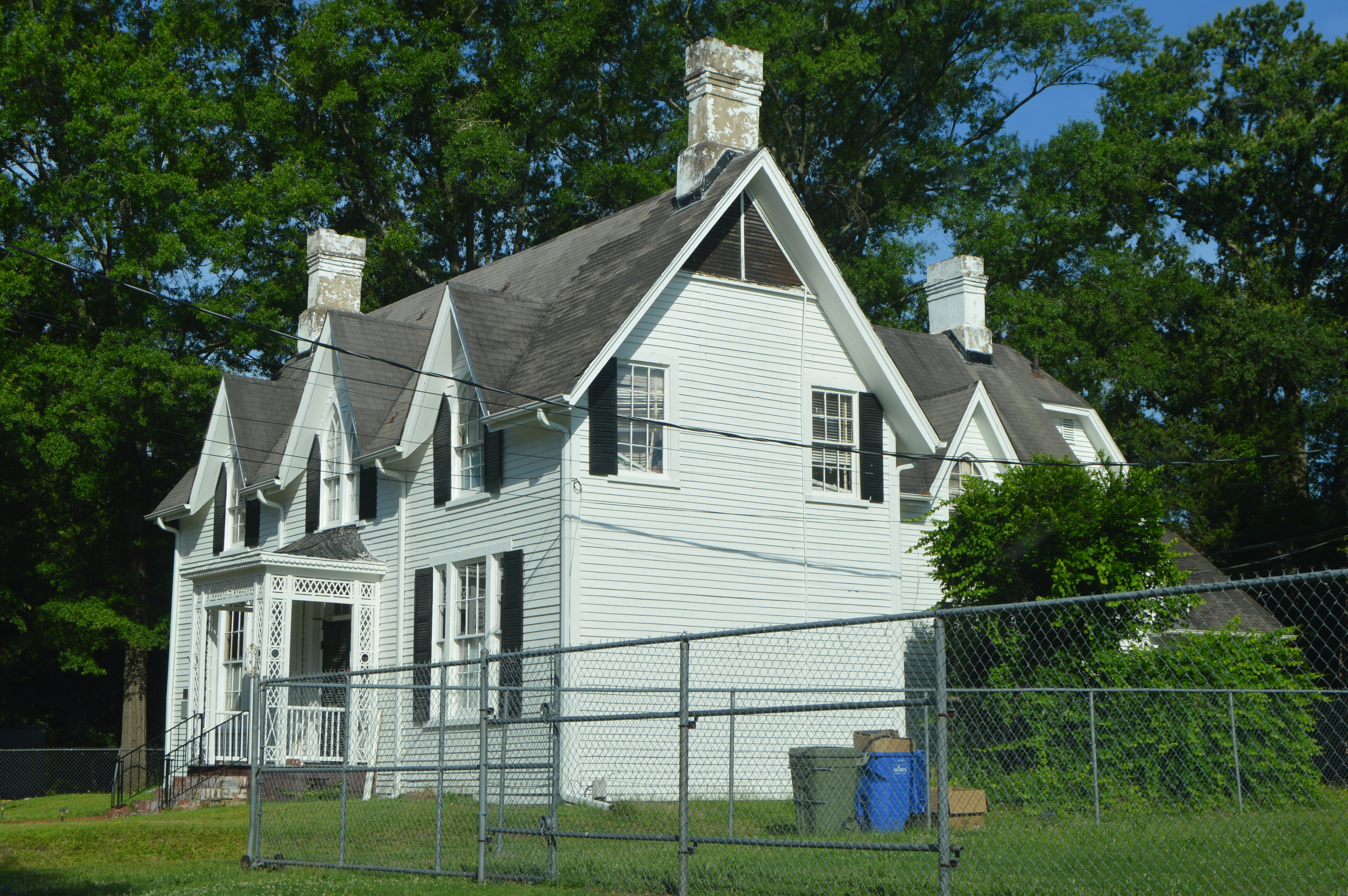
- Eastern side and front

- Location within North Carolina Location within the United States
- Location: 107 N. Rountree St., Wilson, North Carolina
- Coordinates: 35°44′2″N 77°54′55″W
- Area: 0.3 acres (0.12 ha)
- Built: c. 1869
- Built by: Oswald Lipscomb
- Architectural style: Gothic Revival; Colonial Revival
- NRHP reference No.: 82003533
- Added to NRHP: April 26, 1982

Moses Rountree House is a historic home located at Wilson, Wilson County, North Carolina. It was built about 1869, and is a two-story, three bays wide by two bays deep, Gothic Revival style frame house. It has a two-story rear ell. It has a steep gable roof and is sheathed in weatherboard. The house was moved in 1890 and about 1920, and was renovated in the 1930s adding Colonial Revival style design elements.

It was listed on the National Register of Historic Places in 1982.
