= George Henry White =

American politician (1852–1918)

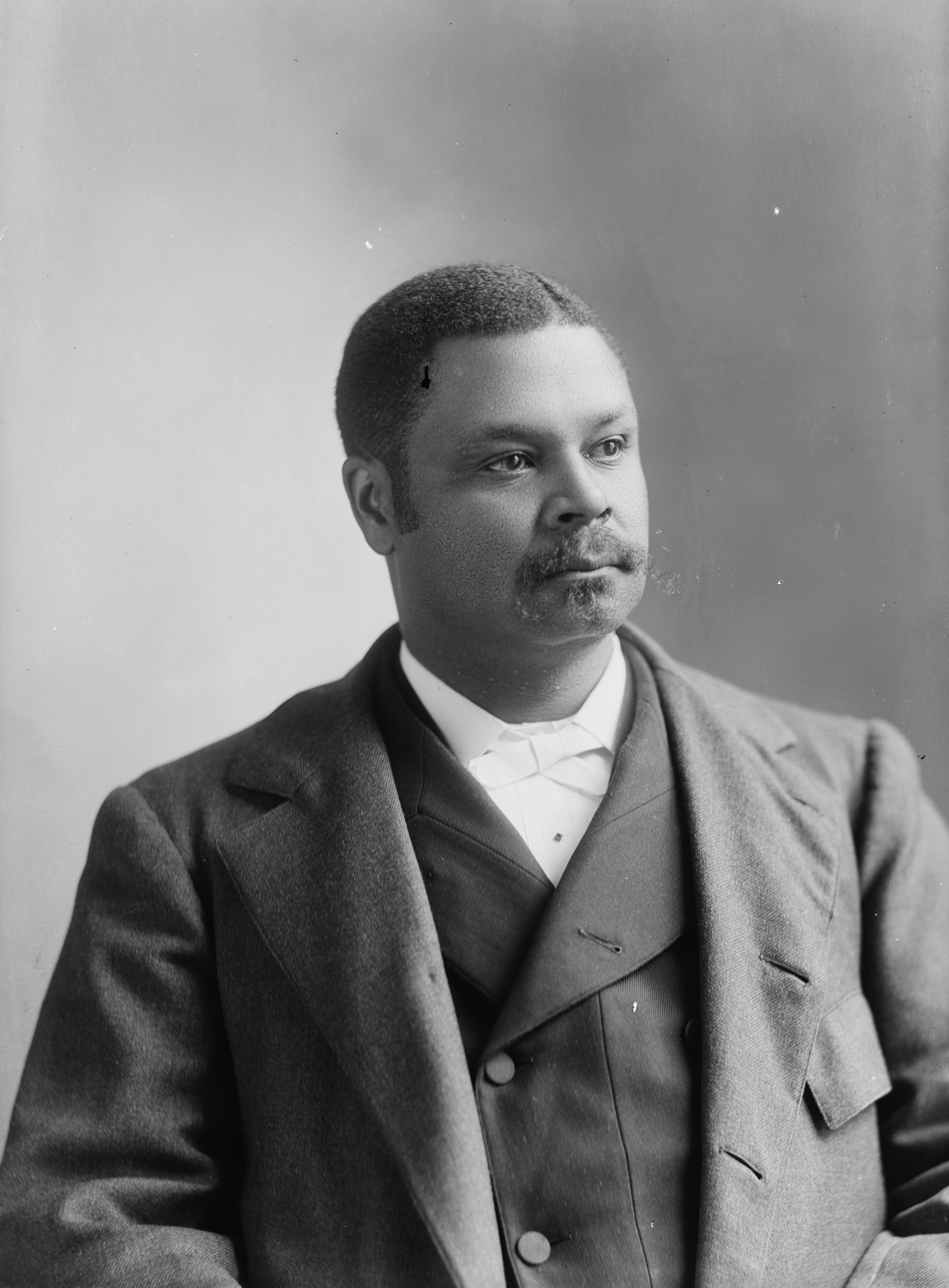
- Portrait by C. M. Bell c. 1897–1901

Member of the U.S. House of Representatives from North Carolina's 2nd district
- In office March 4, 1897 – March 3, 1901
- Preceded by: Frederick A. Woodard
- Succeeded by: Claude Kitchin

Personal details
- Born: December 18, 1852 Rosindale, North Carolina, U.S.
- Died: December 28, 1918 (aged 66) Philadelphia, Pennsylvania, U.S.
- Party: Republican

George Henry White (December 18, 1852 – December 28, 1918) was an American attorney and politician, elected as a Republican U.S. Congressman from North Carolina's 2nd congressional district between 1897 and 1901. He later became a banker in Philadelphia, Pennsylvania and in Whitesboro, New Jersey, an African-American community he co-founded. White was the last African-American congressman during the beginning of the Jim Crow era and the only African American to serve in Congress during his tenure.

In North Carolina, "fusion politics" between the Populist and Republican parties led to a brief period of renewed Republican and African-American political success in elections from 1894 to 1900, when White was elected to Congress for two terms after serving in the state legislature. After the Democratic-dominated state legislature passed a suffrage amendment that disenfranchised blacks in the state, White did not seek a third term. He moved permanently to Washington, D.C., where he had a law practice and became a banker, moving again to Philadelphia in 1906.

After White left office, no other African American served in Congress until 1929. No African American was elected to Congress again from a former Confederate state until Barbara Jordan's election in 1972, and there no African American was elected to Congress from North Carolina again until Eva Clayton in 1992.

== Early life and education ==
White was born in 1852 in Rosindale, Bladen County, North Carolina, where his natural mother may have been a slave. His father, Wiley Franklin White, was a free person of color, of African and Scots-Irish ancestry, who worked as a laborer in a turpentine camp. George had an older brother, John, and their father may have purchased their freedom.

In 1857, George's father married Mary Anna Spaulding, a young local woman of mixed race and the granddaughter of Benjamin Spaulding. Born into slavery as the son of a slave mother and a white plantation owner, Benjamin Spaulding had been freed by his father as a young man. As a free man of color, Spaulding worked to acquire more than 2,300 acres of pine woods, which he apportioned to his own large family.

In 1860, the White family lived on a farm in Welches Creek township, Columbus County. Because George White was so young when Mary Anna joined the family, he always thought of her as his mother. She and his father had more children together, his half-siblings.

George White probably first attended an "old field school", paid for by subscription. After the American Civil War, the Reconstruction-era state legislature established the first public schools for black children in the state. At Welches Creek, in 1870, White met the teacher David P. Allen, who encouraged him. Allen moved to Lumberton, where he established the Whitin Normal School. White studied academic courses there for a couple of years, including Latin, and boarded with Allen and his family. He saved money by running the family farm for a year for his father. Wiley White left the family for Washington, D.C., in 1872 and worked for nearly two decades as a laborer at the Treasury Department.

In 1874, White started studies at Howard University, founded in 1867 in Washington, D.C. as a historically black college open to men and women of all races. He studied classical subjects to be certified as a schoolteacher. In addition, he worked for five months at the 1876 Centennial Exposition in Philadelphia, which had visitors from around the world, and got to see something of its thriving black community, some of whose ancestors had been free since shortly after the American Revolutionary War, when Pennsylvania abolished slavery.

White finished at Howard in 1877 and returned to North Carolina, where he was hired as a principal at a school in New Bern. He also read the law, studying it in the city as a legal apprentice under former Superior Court Judge William J. Clarke, who had become a Republican after the war and founded a newspaper. In 1879, White was admitted to the North Carolina bar.

== Marriage and family ==
On February 27, 1879, White married Fannie B. Randolph, who was the daughter of John Randolph Jr., and Della Redmond Randolph. She died in September 1880, soon after the birth of their daughter Della. In 1882, he married Nancy J. Scott, who died that same year.

On March 15, 1887, he married Cora Lena Cherry. Her sister Louisa was married to Henry Plummer Cheatham, a future political rival. White and Cora had three children: Mary Adelyne, called "Mamie;" Beatrice Odessa (who died young); and George Henry White Jr.

Three of White's four children survived to adulthood: Della died in 1916 in Washington, D.C., followed by George Jr., who died in Pittsburgh in 1927. Mamie died in New York City in 1974.

His wife, Cora Lena White, died in 1905. In 1915, George White married Ellen Avant Macdonald of North Carolina, who survived him.

== Political career ==
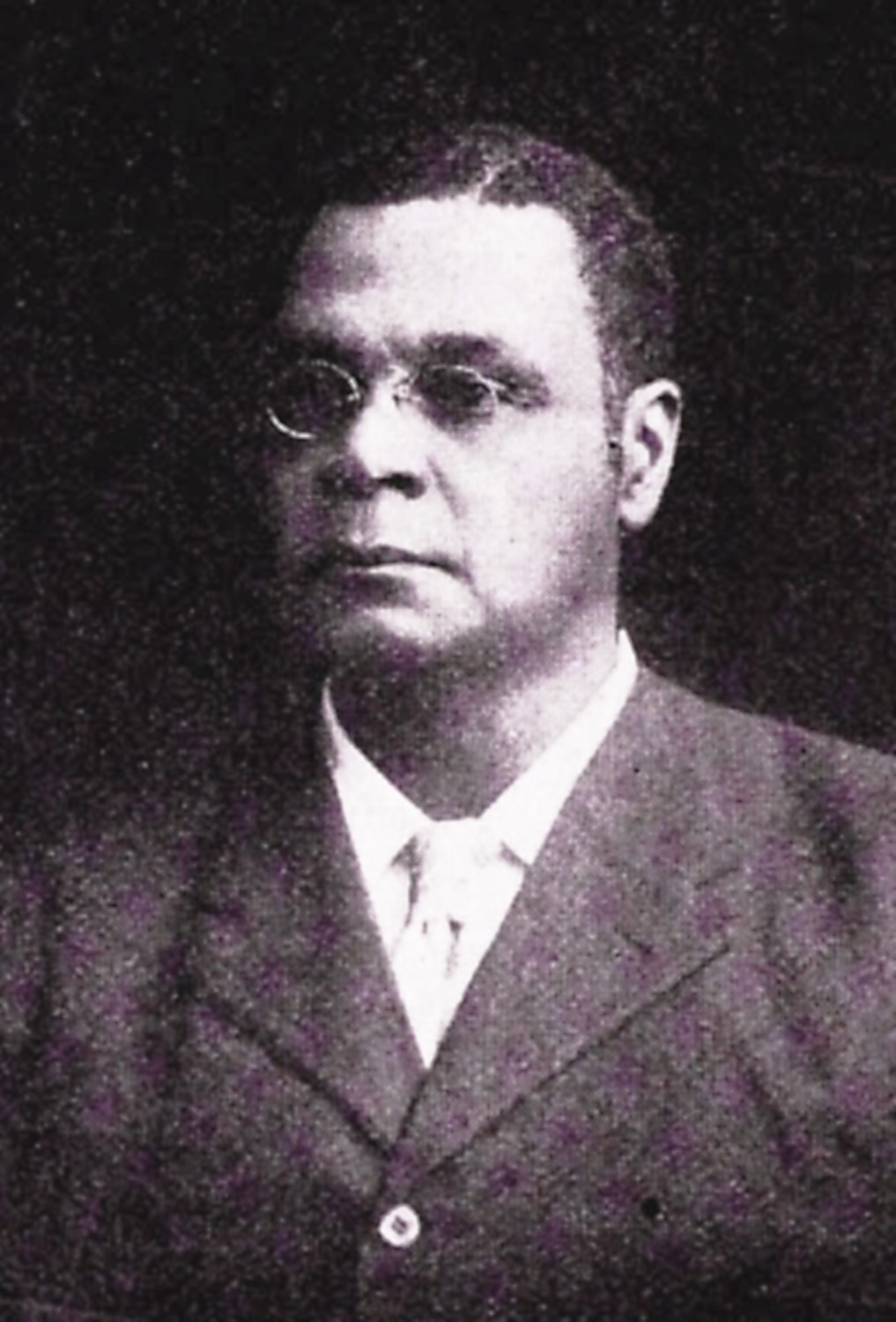
This portrait of George Henry White appeared in the NAACP monthly, The Crisis, shortly after his death.

In 1880, White ran as a Republican candidate from New Bern and was elected to a single term in the North Carolina House of Representatives. He helped pass a law creating four state normal schools for African Americans in order to train more teachers, and was appointed in 1881 as the principal of one of the schools in New Bern. He helped develop the school in its early years and encourage students to go into teaching.

In 1884, White returned to politics, winning election to the North Carolina Senate from Craven County. He was, along with R. S. Taylor, one of two black senators in the 1885 session. In 1886, he was elected solicitor and prosecuting attorney for the second judicial district of North Carolina, a post that he held for eight years until 1894. While considering running for Congress, White had deferred to his brother-in-law, Henry Plummer Cheatham, who was elected to the U.S. House in 1890.

White was a delegate to the 1896 and 1900 Republican National Conventions. In 1896, he was elected to the U.S. Congress, representing the predominantly black Second District from his residence in Tarboro. He defeated the white Democratic incumbent Frederick A. Woodard. The Republican president William McKinley carried many on his coattails, but White also benefited because a Democratic-Populist fusionist candidate had drawn off votes from Woodard. In addition, the 1894 legislature had repealed some laws that Democrats had used to restrict black voting, and the turnout in 1896 among black voters was 85 percent.

In 1898, White was re-elected in a three-way race. In a period of increasing disenfranchisement of blacks in the South, he was the last of five African Americans who were elected and served in Congress during the Jim Crow era of the later nineteenth century. There were two from South Carolina, Cheatham before him from North Carolina, and one from Virginia. After them, no African Americans would be elected from the South until 1972, after federal civil-rights legislation was passed in 1965 to enforce constitutional voting and civil rights for citizens. No African Americans were elected to Congress from North Carolina until 1992.

Republicans since the 1880s had been calling for federal oversight of elections, to try to halt the discriminatory abuses in the South. Representative Henry Cabot Lodge and Senator George Hoar led a renewed effort in early 1890, when Lodge introduced a Federal Elections Bill to enforce provisions of the 15th Amendment giving citizens the right to vote. Henry Cheatham was the only black Congressman at the time, and he never gave a speech while the House considered the bill. It narrowly passed the House in July but languished in the Senate; it was eventually filibustered by Southern Democrats, overwhelmed by debate on silver coinage to relieve economic strain in rural areas.

During his tenure, White worked for African-American civil rights and consistently highlighted issues of justice, relating discussions on the economy, foreign policy and colonization to the treatment of blacks in the South. He supported an effort for reduction legislation derived from the 14th Amendment, to reduce apportionment of Congressional delegations in proportion to the voting population that states were illegally disenfranchising. He challenged the House in 1899 and again after the 1900 census to proceed with reduction legislation.

Representative Edgar Dean Crumpacker of Indiana, who was on the Select Committee of the Census, had introduced a reduction measure that got the most attention, but it was reported out of committee in 1899, too late for action. In 1901, he introduced another measure, this one proposed to penalize Louisiana, Mississippi, North Carolina, and South Carolina, which had approved state constitutions disenfranchising blacks. (They were followed by other Southern states through 1908.) Crumpacker proposed a plan based on reducing representation based on total state illiteracy rates, as he believed that illiterates would fail the education or literacy tests. While his plan earned much discussion, his bill was tabled. A reduction effort in 1902 also failed.

White, with the backing of the state's Republican senator, Jeter C. Pritchard, used the power of his office to convince President William McKinley appoint 34 African-American postmasters across his district, a scale of black postal hiring then unprecedented in North Carolina.

Following the Wilmington massacre of 1898, which saw large numbers of African Americans murdered or displaced when the duly elected Fusionist biracial local government of Wilmington, North Carolina, was violently overthrown by white-supremacist terrorists, White and two dozen other representatives from the National Afro-American Council met with McKinley and unsuccessfully pressed him to speak out against lynching. On January 20, 1900, White introduced the first bill in Congress to make lynching a federal crime to be prosecuted by federal courts. He argued that the majority of lynchings punished consensual sex between black men and white women, and that far more white men assaulted black women. A February 2 editorial by Josephus Daniels, one of the ringleaders of the Wilmington massacre, who also later served as Secretary of the Navy, in the News and Observer, responded with personal attacks against White, and claimed that White was justifying assaults on white women by slandering white men. The bill died in committee, opposed by Southern white Democrats, who were making up the Solid South block.

A month later, as the House was debating issues of territorial expansion internationally, White again defended his bill by giving examples of crimes in the South. He said that conditions in the region had to "provoke questions about ... national and international policy." White stated,

Should not a nation be just to all her citizens, protect them alike in all their rights, on every foot of her soil, in a word, show herself capable of governing all within her domain before she undertakes to exercise sovereign authority over those of a foreign land—with foreign notions and habits not at all in harmony with our American system of government? Or, to be more explicit, should not charity first begin at home?

Following the actions of North Carolina Democrats in 1899, who passed a suffrage amendment to the state constitution to disenfranchise blacks, White chose not to seek a third term in the 1900 elections. He told the Chicago Tribune, "I cannot live in North Carolina and be a man and be treated as a man." He announced plans to leave his home state and start a law practice in Washington, DC at the end of his term. White also blamed the continued newspaper attacks on his character, claiming that these had ruined the health of his wife.

I am certain the excitement of another campaign would kill her...My wife is a refined and educated woman, and she has suffered terribly because of the attacks on me.

White delivered his final speech in the House on January 29, 1901:

This is perhaps the Negroes' temporary farewell to the American Congress, but let me say, Phoenix-like he will rise up some day and come again. These parting words are in behalf of an outraged, heart-broken, bruised and bleeding, but God-fearing people; faithful, industrious, loyal, rising people – full of potential force.

On March 4, 1901, at the moment that White's term formally ended, white legislators in Raleigh celebrated. North Carolina Democrat A. D. Watts announced:

George H. White, the insolent negro... has retired from office forever. And from this hour on no negro will again disgrace the old State in the council of chambers of the nation. For these mercies, thank God."

== Later life ==
Following White's departure, no other African American served in Congress until Oscar De Priest was elected from Illinois in 1928. No African-American North Carolinian was elected to Congress until Eva Clayton and Mel Watt won seats in the House of Representatives in 1992. White returned to law and entered banking, having moved his family to Washington DC, in 1900. White was wealthy, with a net worth of $30,000 in 1902.

In 1906, the White family moved to Philadelphia, Pennsylvania, a city with a well established African-American community, which was then experiencing significant growth due to the Great Migration. During this time, White practiced law and founded a commercial savings bank. White was a co-founder of the town of Whitesboro in southern New Jersey as a planned community developed for African Americans. He worked with prominent investors, such as Booker T. Washington, president of Tuskegee Institute, and poet Paul Laurence Dunbar, along with two daughters of Judge Mifflin W. Gibbs: Ida Gibbs Hunt and Harriet Gibbs Marshall.

White was an early officer in the National Afro-American Council, a nationwide civil-rights organization created in 1898. He served several terms as one of nine national vice presidents, and he twice was an unsuccessful candidate for the council's presidency. After the Council dissolved in 1908, he became an early member of the National Association for the Advancement of Colored People, which was founded that year. It formed a Philadelphia chapter in 1913.

In 1912, White was an unsuccessful candidate for the Republican nomination for Congress from Pennsylvania's 1st congressional district, following the death of the incumbent congressman. In 1916, he became the first African American from Pennsylvania to be selected as an alternate delegate at-large to the Republican National Convention. In 1917, White was appointed assistant city solicitor for Philadelphia following the death of Harry W. Bass.

White died in his home in Philadelphia in 1918, and was buried at an unmarked grave in Eden Cemetery in nearby Collingdale. His son George Jr. (d. 1927, Pittsburgh) and daughter Mamie (d. 1974, New York City) were buried next to him. His widow, Ellen White, moved to Atlantic City, New Jersey in 1920; by 1930, she married Edward W. Coston there.

== Legacy and honors ==
- In the 1970s White Circle, a street in Soul City, North Carolina, was named in honor of White.
- In 2002, the town of Tarboro, where White lived during his tenure in Congress, established "George White Day" and has since celebrated it annually.
- On September 26, 2009, President Barack Obama referred to White's farewell speech in his remarks at the Congressional Black Caucus Foundation's Annual Awards Dinner in Washington, DC.
- In 2010, a North Carolina state highway historical marker in White's honor was dedicated in Tarboro.
- In 2012 George Henry White: American Phoenix, a documentary about George Henry White's life and legacy, was released. 115 mins. Produced by LightSmith Productions.
- The George Henry White Fund was set up to support efforts for education about his life and legacy.
- In 2013, a historic marker in White's honor was set up in Whitesboro by the "Concerned Citizens of Whitesboro, New Jersey."
- In 2014, the George Henry White Pioneer Award was established by the Benjamin and Edith Spaulding Descendants Foundation in his honor; that year the biannual award was presented to Dr. Benjamin R. Justesen, who has published the first full-length biography of White and an edited collection of his writings and speeches.
- On October 29, 2015, a gravestone for White's grave was unveiled at Historic Eden Cemetery in Collingdale, Pennsylvania. Speakers included State Senator Anthony H. Williams of Philadelphia (Eighth District).
- In 2015, the George Henry White Memorial Community Center has been founded in Bladen County, North Carolina, White's birthplace, for education about him and the achievements of people associated with the Farmers' Union community in Columbus and Bladen counties.

== See also ==
- African Americans in the United States Congress
- List of African-American United States representatives

== Bibliography ==
- Healy, Thomas (2021). Soul City: Race, Equality, and the Lost Dream of an American Utopia. New York City: Metropolitan Books. ISBN 9781627798624.
- Justesen, Benjamin R. (2005). "Black Tip, White Iceberg: Black Postmasters and the Rise of White Supremacy in North Carolina, 1897–1901". The North Carolina Historical Review. 82 (2): 193–227. JSTOR 23523507.
- Justesen, Benjamin R. (2001). George Henry White: An Even Chance in the Race of Life. Louisiana State University Press. ISBN 9780807125861.
- Zucchino, David (2020). Wilmington's Lie: The Murderous Coup of 1898 and the Rise of White Supremacy. Atlantic Monthly Press. ISBN 9780802128386.

U.S. House of Representatives
Preceded by Frederick A. Woodard	Member of the U.S. House of Representatives from North Carolina's 2nd congressional district 1897–1901	Succeeded by Claude Kitchin
