= List of African-American United States representatives =

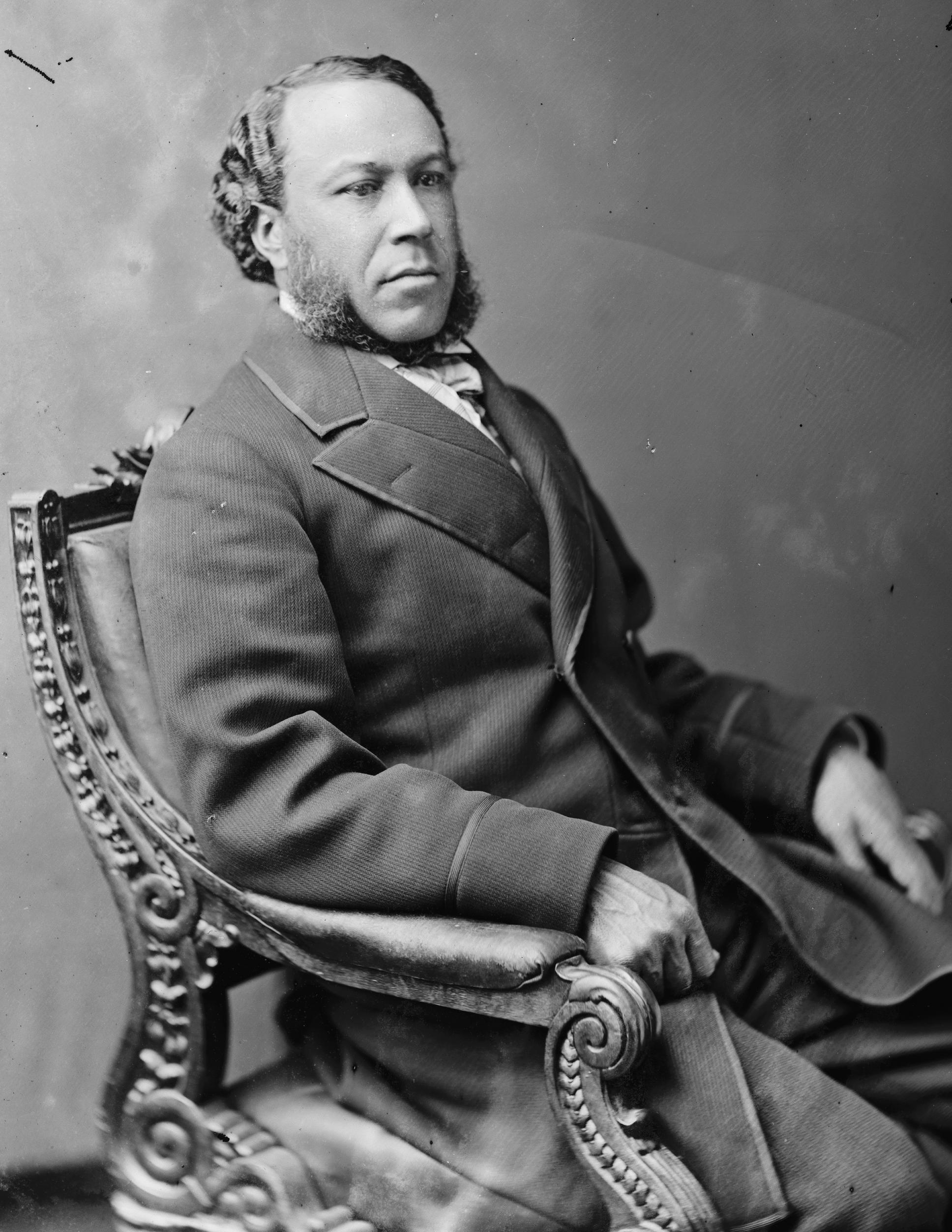
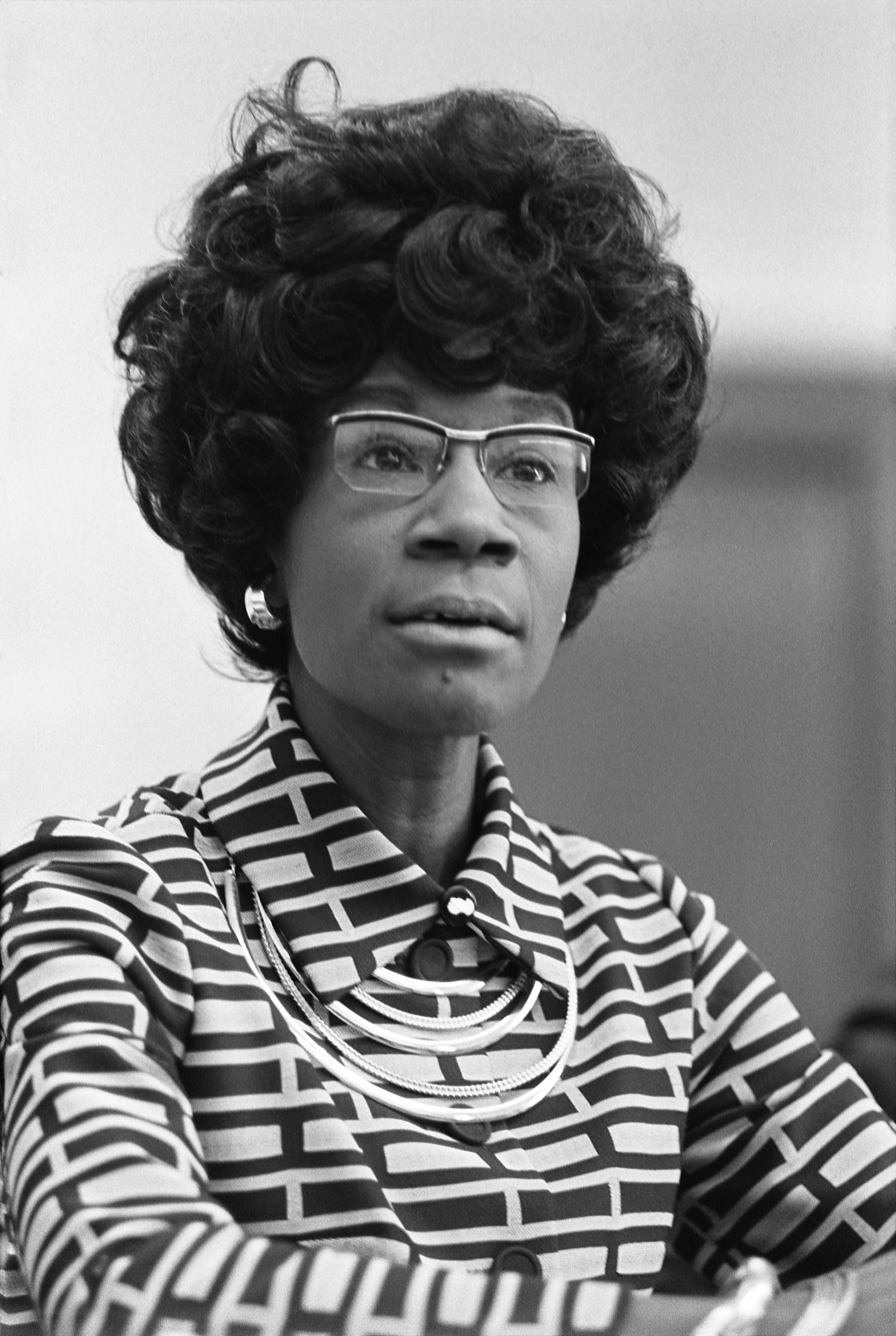
Joseph Rainey (left) was the first African American to serve in the U.S. House; Shirley Chisholm (right) was the first African-American woman elected to the chamber.

The United States House of Representatives has had 189 elected African-American members, of whom 183 have been representatives from U.S. states and six have been delegates from U.S. territories and the District of Columbia. The House of Representatives is the lower house of the bicameral United States Congress, which is the legislative branch of the federal government of the United States.

According to the U.S. Census Bureau, the term "African American" includes all individuals who identify with one or more nationalities or ethnic groups originating in any of the black racial groups of Africa. The term is generally used for Americans with at least partial ancestry in any of the original peoples of sub-Saharan Africa. During the founding of the federal government, African Americans were consigned to a status of second-class citizenship or enslaved. No African American served in federal elective office before the ratification in 1870 of the Fifteenth Amendment to the United States Constitution. The Fifteenth Amendment prohibits the federal and state governments from denying any citizen the right to vote because of that citizen's race, color, or previous condition of servitude.

Joseph Rainey was the first African-American representative to be seated in the U.S. House. He served South Carolina's 1st congressional district beginning in 1870 during the Reconstruction era following the American Civil War. The first African-American woman to serve as a representative was Shirley Chisholm from New York's 12th congressional district in 1969 during the Civil Rights Movement.

Many African-American members of the House of Representatives serve majority-minority districts. Some of these congressional districts are gerrymandered, limiting serious challenges to their re-election, and limiting their abilities to represent a larger, more diverse constituency. The Voting Rights Act of 1965 includes restrictions on the ability of States to diminish minority representation during redistricting. In the elections of 2016 and 2018, an increasing number of non-majority-minority districts have elected racial minority representatives.

Overall, 32 of the 50 U.S. states, plus the U.S. Virgin Islands and the District of Columbia, have elected an African American to represent them in the U.S. House of Representatives, with Oregon being the most recent to elect its first, in 2024. Out of these, 24 states, plus the U.S. Virgin Islands and the District of Columbia, have elected an African-American woman to represent them in the U.S. House. Illinois's 1st congressional district has the longest continuous streak of electing African-American representatives, a stretch that has lasted since 1928. As of 2025 there are 61 African-American representatives and two African-American delegates in the United States House of Representatives, representing 29 states, plus the U.S. Virgin Islands and the District of Columbia. Most are members of the Congressional Black Caucus.

== List of states represented by African Americans ==
State	Current members	Previous members	Total	First African-American member	Political party of first African-American member	Years with African-American members
Alabama	2	5	7	Benjamin S. Turner	Republican	1871–1877, 1993–present
Alaska	0	0	0			
Arizona	0	0	0			
Arkansas	0	0	0			
California	3	11	14	Augustus F. Hawkins	Democratic	1963–present
Colorado	1	0	1	Joe Neguse	Democratic	2019–present
Connecticut	1	1	2	Gary Franks	Republican	1991–1997, 2019–present
Delaware	0	1	1	Lisa Blunt Rochester	Democratic	2017–2025
Florida	3	9	12	Josiah T. Walls	Republican	1871–1876, 1993–present
Georgia	5	7	12	Jefferson F. Long	Republican	1871, 1973–1977, 1987–present
Hawaii	0	0	0			
Idaho	0	0	0			
Illinois	4	13	17	Oscar Stanton DePriest	Republican	1929–present
Indiana	1	2	3	Katie Hall	Democratic	1982–1985, 1997–present
Iowa	0	0	0			
Kansas	0	0	0			
Kentucky	0	0	0			
Louisiana	2	3	5	Charles E. Nash	Republican	1875–1877, 1991–2009, 2011–present
Maine	0	0	0			
Maryland	2	5	7	Parren Mitchell	Democratic	1971–present
Massachusetts	1	0	1	Ayanna Pressley	Democratic	2019–present
Michigan	1	8	9	Charles Diggs	Democratic	1955–present
Minnesota	1	1	2	Keith Ellison	Democratic–Farmer–Labor	2007–present
Mississippi	1	2	3	John R. Lynch	Republican	1873–1877, 1882–1883, 1987–present
Missouri	2	4	6	Bill Clay	Democratic	1969–present
Montana	0	0	0			
Nebraska	0	0	0			
Nevada	1	0	1	Steven Horsford	Democratic	2013–2015, 2019–present
New Hampshire	0	0	0			
New Jersey	4	2	6	Donald M. Payne	Democratic	1989–present
New Mexico	0	0	0			
New York	5	10	15	Adam Clayton Powell Jr.	Democratic	1945–present
North Carolina	3	8	11	John Adams Hyman	Republican	1875–1877, 1883–1887, 1889–1893, 1897–1901, 1992–present
North Dakota	0	0	0			
Ohio	3	3	6	Louis Stokes	Democratic	1969–present
Oklahoma	0	1	1	J. C. Watts	Republican	1995–2003
Oregon	1	0	1	Janelle Bynum	Democratic	2025–present
Pennsylvania	2	4	6	Robert N. C. Nix Sr.	Democratic	1958–present
Rhode Island	1	0	1	Gabe Amo	Democratic	2023–present
South Carolina	1	9	10	Joseph Rainey	Republican	1870–1879, 1882–1887, 1890–1891, 1893–1897, 1993–present
South Dakota	0	0	0			
Tennessee	0	2	2	Harold Ford Sr.	Democratic	1975–2007
Texas	5	9	14	Barbara Jordan	Democratic	1973–present
Utah	1	1	2	Mia Love	Republican	2015–2019, 2021–present
Vermont	0	0	0			
Virginia	2	2	4	John Mercer Langston	Republican	1890–1891, 1993–present
Washington	1	0	1	Marilyn Strickland	Democratic	2021–present
West Virginia	0	0	0			
Wisconsin	1	0	1	Gwen Moore	Democratic	2005–present
Wyoming	0	0	0			

== List of African Americans in the U.S. House ==
=== Reconstruction and early post-Reconstruction era, 1870–1887 ===
Political party

Republican

Name	District	Start	End	Party	Congress	Former slave?	Notes
Joseph Rainey (1832–1887)	South Carolina's 1st	December 12, 1870	March 3, 1879	Republican	41st (1869–1871)	Yes	Lost reelection (Note: Elected to fill vacancy caused by resignation of Benjamin Whittemore. First African American to serve in the United States House of Representatives and the first to serve in Congress from South Carolina.)
Joseph Rainey (1832–1887)	South Carolina's 1st	December 12, 1870	March 3, 1879	Republican	THRU	Yes	Lost reelection
Joseph Rainey (1832–1887)	South Carolina's 1st	December 12, 1870	March 3, 1879	Republican	45th (1877–1879)	Yes	Lost reelection
Jefferson F. Long (1836–1901)	Georgia's 4th	January 16, 1871	March 3, 1871	Republican	41st (1869–1871)	Yes	Retired (Note: Elected to fill vacancy caused by the House of Representatives denial to seat Samuel F. Gove. First African American to serve in Congress from Georgia.)
Robert C. De Large (1842–1874)	South Carolina's 2nd	March 4, 1871	January 24, 1873	Republican	42nd (1871–1873)	No	Unseated in 1873 due to a contested election that involved Christopher C. Bowen, the previous seat holder (Note: The seat remained vacant until March 1873.)
Robert B. Elliott (1842–1884)	South Carolina's 3rd	March 4, 1871	November 1, 1874	Republican	42nd (1871–1873)	No	Resigned (Note: Elected in November 1874 to the South Carolina House of Representatives.)
Robert B. Elliott (1842–1884)	South Carolina's 3rd	March 4, 1871	November 1, 1874	Republican	43rd (1873–1875)	No	Resigned
Benjamin S. Turner (1825–1894)	Alabama's 1st	March 4, 1871	March 3, 1873	Republican	42nd (1871–1873)	Yes	Lost reelection (Note: First African American to serve in Congress from Alabama.)
Josiah T. Walls (1842–1905)	Florida's at-large	March 4, 1871	January 29, 1873	Republican	42nd (1871–1873)	Yes	Unseated in 1873 and 1876 due to contested elections that involved Silas L. Niblack and Jesse Finley, respectively. (Note: First African American to serve in Congress from Florida.)
Josiah T. Walls (1842–1905)	Florida's at-large	March 4, 1873	March 3, 1875	Republican	43rd (1873–1875)	Yes	Unseated in 1873 and 1876 due to contested elections that involved Silas L. Niblack and Jesse Finley, respectively.
Josiah T. Walls (1842–1905)	Florida's 2nd	March 4, 1875	April 19, 1876	Republican	44th (1875–1877)	Yes	Unseated in 1873 and 1876 due to contested elections that involved Silas L. Niblack and Jesse Finley, respectively.
Richard H. Cain (1825–1887)	South Carolina's at-large	March 4, 1873	March 3, 1875	Republican	43rd (1873–1875)	No	Retired
Richard H. Cain (1825–1887)	South Carolina's 2nd	March 4, 1877	March 3, 1879	Republican	45th (1877–1879)	No	Retired
John R. Lynch (1847–1939)	Mississippi's 6th	March 4, 1873	March 3, 1877	Republican	43rd (1873–1875)	Yes	Lost reelection (Note: Seated in Congress after contested election that involved James Chalmers in 1882. First African American to serve in the United States House of Representatives from Mississippi. Youngest member of the 43rd United States Congress at age 26.)
John R. Lynch (1847–1939)	Mississippi's 6th	March 4, 1873	March 3, 1877	Republican	44th (1875–1877)	Yes	Lost reelection
John R. Lynch (1847–1939)	Mississippi's 6th	April 29, 1882	March 3, 1883	Republican	47th (1881–1883)	Yes	Lost reelection
Alonzo J. Ransier (1834–1882)	South Carolina's 2nd	March 4, 1873	March 3, 1875	Republican	43rd (1873–1875)	No	Retired (Note: Lieutenant Governor of South Carolina (1870-1872))
James T. Rapier (1837–1883)	Alabama's 2nd	March 4, 1873	March 3, 1875	Republican	43rd (1873–1875)	No	Lost reelection
Jeremiah Haralson (1846–1916)	Alabama's 1st	March 4, 1875	March 3, 1877	Republican	44th (1875–1877)	Yes	Lost reelection
John Adams Hyman (1840–1891)	North Carolina's 2nd	March 4, 1875	March 3, 1877	Republican	44th (1875–1877)	Yes	Lost renomination (Note: First African American to serve in Congress from North Carolina.)
Charles E. Nash (1844–1913)	Louisiana's 6th	March 4, 1875	March 3, 1877	Republican	44th (1875–1877)	No	Lost reelection (Note: First African American to serve in Congress from Louisiana.)
Robert Smalls (1839–1915)	South Carolina's 5th	March 4, 1875	March 3, 1879	Republican	44th (1875–1877)	Yes	Lost reelection (Note: Seated in Congress after contested election that involved George Tillman in 1882. Elected in 1884 to fill vacancy caused by death of Edmund Mackey.)
Robert Smalls (1839–1915)	South Carolina's 5th	March 4, 1875	March 3, 1879	Republican	45th (1877–1879)	Yes	Lost reelection
Robert Smalls (1839–1915)	South Carolina's 5th	July 19, 1882	March 3, 1883	Republican	47th (1881–1883)	Yes	Lost reelection
Robert Smalls (1839–1915)	South Carolina's 7th	March 18, 1884	March 3, 1887	Republican	48th (1883–1885)	Yes	Retired
Robert Smalls (1839–1915)	South Carolina's 7th	March 18, 1884	March 3, 1887	Republican	49th (1885–1887)	Yes	Retired
James E. O'Hara (1844–1905)	North Carolina's 2nd	March 4, 1883	March 3, 1887	Republican	48th (1883–1885)	No	Lost reelection
James E. O'Hara (1844–1905)	North Carolina's 2nd	March 4, 1883	March 3, 1887	Republican	49th (1885–1887)	No	Lost reelection

=== Late post-Reconstruction, Populist, and early Jim Crow era, 1887–1929 ===
Political party

Republican

Name	District	Start	End	Party	Congress	Former slave?	Notes
Henry P. Cheatham (1857–1935)	North Carolina's 2nd	March 4, 1889	March 3, 1893	Republican	51st (1889–1891)	Yes	Lost reelection (Note: Brother-in-law of George Henry White.)
Henry P. Cheatham (1857–1935)	North Carolina's 2nd	March 4, 1889	March 3, 1893	Republican	52nd (1891–1893)	Yes	Lost reelection
John Mercer Langston (1829–1897)	Virginia's 4th	September 23, 1890	March 3, 1891	Republican	51st (1889–1891)	No	Lost reelection (Note: Seated in Congress after the contested election that involved Edward Venable in September 1890. First African American to serve in Congress from Virginia.)
Thomas E. Miller (1849–1938)	South Carolina's 7th	September 24, 1890	March 3, 1891	Republican	51st (1889–1891)	No	Lost reelection (Note: Seated in Congress after contested election that involved William Elliott in September 1890.)
George W. Murray (1853–1926)	South Carolina's 7th	March 4, 1893	March 3, 1895	Republican	53rd (1893–1895)	Yes	Lost reelection (Note: Seated in Congress after contested election that involved William Elliott in June 1896. Distant relative of Jim Clyburn.)
George W. Murray (1853–1926)	South Carolina's 1st	June 4, 1896	March 3, 1897	Republican	54th (1895–1897)	Yes	Lost reelection
George Henry White (1852–1918)	North Carolina's 2nd	March 4, 1897	March 3, 1901	Republican	55th (1897–1899)	Yes	Retired (Note: Brother-in-law of Henry P. Cheatham. The last African American to serve in Congress from a Southern state until Barbara Jordan from Texas and Andrew Young from Georgia in 1973.)
George Henry White (1852–1918)	North Carolina's 2nd	March 4, 1897	March 3, 1901	Republican	56th (1899–1901)	Yes	Retired

=== Late Jim Crow and Civil Rights era, 1929–1970 ===
Political parties

Democratic Republican

Name	District	Start	End	Party	Congress	Notes
Oscar Stanton De Priest (1871–1951)	Illinois's 1st	March 4, 1929	January 3, 1935	Republican	71st (1929–1931)	Lost reelection (Note: First African American to serve in Congress from Illinois and the first to serve from outside the Southern states.)
Oscar Stanton De Priest (1871–1951)	Illinois's 1st	March 4, 1929	January 3, 1935	Republican	72nd (1931–1933)	Lost reelection
Oscar Stanton De Priest (1871–1951)	Illinois's 1st	March 4, 1929	January 3, 1935	Republican	73rd (1933–1935)	Lost reelection
Arthur W. Mitchell (1883–1968)	Illinois's 1st	January 3, 1935	January 3, 1943	Democratic	74th (1935–1937)	Retired (Note: First African American to be elected to Congress as a member of the Democratic party.)
Arthur W. Mitchell (1883–1968)	Illinois's 1st	January 3, 1935	January 3, 1943	Democratic	THRU	Retired
Arthur W. Mitchell (1883–1968)	Illinois's 1st	January 3, 1935	January 3, 1943	Democratic	77th (1941–1943)	Retired
William L. Dawson (1886–1970)	Illinois's 1st	January 3, 1943	November 9, 1970	Democratic	78th (1943–1945)	Died in office
William L. Dawson (1886–1970)	Illinois's 1st	January 3, 1943	November 9, 1970	Democratic	THRU	Died in office
William L. Dawson (1886–1970)	Illinois's 1st	January 3, 1943	November 9, 1970	Democratic	91st (1969–1971)	Died in office
Adam Clayton Powell Jr. (1908–1972)	New York's 22nd	January 3, 1945	January 3, 1953	Democratic	79th (1945–1947)	Lost renomination (Note: Excluded from membership in the 90th United States Congress in February 1967. Reelected to fill vacancy caused by exclusion from membership, but did not take oath of office. First African American to serve in Congress from New York.)
Adam Clayton Powell Jr. (1908–1972)	New York's 22nd	January 3, 1945	January 3, 1953	Democratic	THRU	Lost renomination
Adam Clayton Powell Jr. (1908–1972)	New York's 22nd	January 3, 1945	January 3, 1953	Democratic	82nd (1951–1953)	Lost renomination
Adam Clayton Powell Jr. (1908–1972)	New York's 16th	January 3, 1953	January 3, 1963	Democratic	83rd (1953–1955)	Lost renomination
Adam Clayton Powell Jr. (1908–1972)	New York's 16th	January 3, 1953	January 3, 1963	Democratic	THRU	Lost renomination
Adam Clayton Powell Jr. (1908–1972)	New York's 16th	January 3, 1953	January 3, 1963	Democratic	87th (1961–1963)	Lost renomination
Adam Clayton Powell Jr. (1908–1972)	New York's 18th	January 3, 1963	February 28, 1967	Democratic	88th (1963–1965)	Lost renomination
Adam Clayton Powell Jr. (1908–1972)	New York's 18th	January 3, 1963	February 28, 1967	Democratic	89th (1965–1967)	Lost renomination
Adam Clayton Powell Jr. (1908–1972)	New York's 18th	January 3, 1963	February 28, 1967	Democratic	90th (1967–1969)	Lost renomination
Adam Clayton Powell Jr. (1908–1972)	New York's 18th	April 11, 1967	January 3, 1971	Democratic	90th (1967–1969)	Lost renomination
Adam Clayton Powell Jr. (1908–1972)	New York's 18th	April 11, 1967	January 3, 1971	Democratic	91st (1969–1971)	Lost renomination
Charles Diggs (1922–1998)	Michigan's 13th	January 3, 1955	June 3, 1980	Democratic	84th (1955–1957)	Resigned after being convicted of mail fraud (Note: First African American to serve in Congress from Michigan. The first person to serve as chair of the Congressional Black Caucus in the 91st United States Congress during the first session.)
Charles Diggs (1922–1998)	Michigan's 13th	January 3, 1955	June 3, 1980	Democratic	THRU	Resigned after being convicted of mail fraud
Charles Diggs (1922–1998)	Michigan's 13th	January 3, 1955	June 3, 1980	Democratic	96th (1979–1981)	Resigned after being convicted of mail fraud
Robert N. C. Nix Sr. (1898–1987)	Pennsylvania's 4th	June 4, 1958	January 3, 1963	Democratic	85th (1957–1959)	Lost renomination (Note: Elected to fill vacancy caused by the resignation of Earl Chudoff in 1958. First African American to serve in Congress from Pennsylvania.)
Robert N. C. Nix Sr. (1898–1987)	Pennsylvania's 4th	June 4, 1958	January 3, 1963	Democratic	THRU	Lost renomination
Robert N. C. Nix Sr. (1898–1987)	Pennsylvania's 4th	June 4, 1958	January 3, 1963	Democratic	87th (1961–1963)	Lost renomination
Robert N. C. Nix Sr. (1898–1987)	Pennsylvania's 2nd	January 3, 1963	January 3, 1979	Democratic	88th (1963–1965)	Lost renomination
Robert N. C. Nix Sr. (1898–1987)	Pennsylvania's 2nd	January 3, 1963	January 3, 1979	Democratic	THRU	Lost renomination
Robert N. C. Nix Sr. (1898–1987)	Pennsylvania's 2nd	January 3, 1963	January 3, 1979	Democratic	95th (1977–1979)	Lost renomination
Augustus F. Hawkins (1907–2007)	California's 21st	January 3, 1963	January 3, 1975	Democratic	88th (1963–1965)	Retired (Note: First African American to serve in Congress from California.)
Augustus F. Hawkins (1907–2007)	California's 21st	January 3, 1963	January 3, 1975	Democratic	THRU	Retired
Augustus F. Hawkins (1907–2007)	California's 21st	January 3, 1963	January 3, 1975	Democratic	93rd (1973–1975)	Retired
Augustus F. Hawkins (1907–2007)	California's 29th	January 3, 1975	January 3, 1991	Democratic	94th (1975–1977)	Retired
Augustus F. Hawkins (1907–2007)	California's 29th	January 3, 1975	January 3, 1991	Democratic	THRU	Retired
Augustus F. Hawkins (1907–2007)	California's 29th	January 3, 1975	January 3, 1991	Democratic	101st (1989–1991)	Retired
John Conyers (1929–2019)	Michigan's 1st	January 3, 1965	January 3, 1993	Democratic	89th (1965–1967)	Resigned after being accused of sexual harassment. (Note: First African American to become Dean of the United States House of Representatives.)
John Conyers (1929–2019)	Michigan's 1st	January 3, 1965	January 3, 1993	Democratic	THRU	Resigned after being accused of sexual harassment.
John Conyers (1929–2019)	Michigan's 1st	January 3, 1965	January 3, 1993	Democratic	102nd (1991–1993)	Resigned after being accused of sexual harassment.
John Conyers (1929–2019)	Michigan's 14th	January 3, 1993	January 3, 2013	Democratic	103rd (1993–1995)	Resigned after being accused of sexual harassment.
John Conyers (1929–2019)	Michigan's 14th	January 3, 1993	January 3, 2013	Democratic	THRU	Resigned after being accused of sexual harassment.
John Conyers (1929–2019)	Michigan's 14th	January 3, 1993	January 3, 2013	Democratic	112th (2011–2013)	Resigned after being accused of sexual harassment.
John Conyers (1929–2019)	Michigan's 13th	January 3, 2013	December 5, 2017	Democratic	113th (2013–2015)	Resigned after being accused of sexual harassment.
John Conyers (1929–2019)	Michigan's 13th	January 3, 2013	December 5, 2017	Democratic	THRU	Resigned after being accused of sexual harassment.
John Conyers (1929–2019)	Michigan's 13th	January 3, 2013	December 5, 2017	Democratic	115th (2017–2019)	Resigned after being accused of sexual harassment.
Shirley Chisholm (1924–2005)	New York's 12th	January 3, 1969	January 3, 1983	Democratic	91st (1969–1971)	Retired (Note: First African-American woman to serve in Congress and the first African-American woman to run as a presidential candidate in 1972.)
Shirley Chisholm (1924–2005)	New York's 12th	January 3, 1969	January 3, 1983	Democratic	THRU	Retired
Shirley Chisholm (1924–2005)	New York's 12th	January 3, 1969	January 3, 1983	Democratic	97th (1981–1983)	Retired
Bill Clay (1931–2025)	Missouri's 1st	January 3, 1969	January 3, 2001	Democratic	91st (1969–1971)	Retired (Note: His son, Lacy Clay, succeeded him in office. First African American to serve in Congress from Missouri.)
Bill Clay (1931–2025)	Missouri's 1st	January 3, 1969	January 3, 2001	Democratic	THRU	Retired
Bill Clay (1931–2025)	Missouri's 1st	January 3, 1969	January 3, 2001	Democratic	106th (1999–2001)	Retired
Louis Stokes (1925–2015)	Ohio's 21st	January 3, 1969	January 3, 1993	Democratic	91st (1969–1971)	Retired (Note: First African American to serve in Congress from Ohio. Served as chair of the Congressional Black Caucus in the 92nd United States Congress during the second session and in the 93rd United States Congress during the first session.)
Louis Stokes (1925–2015)	Ohio's 21st	January 3, 1969	January 3, 1993	Democratic	THRU	Retired
Louis Stokes (1925–2015)	Ohio's 21st	January 3, 1969	January 3, 1993	Democratic	102nd (1991–1993)	Retired
Louis Stokes (1925–2015)	Ohio's 11th	January 3, 1993	January 3, 1999	Democratic	103rd (1993–1995)	Retired
Louis Stokes (1925–2015)	Ohio's 11th	January 3, 1993	January 3, 1999	Democratic	THRU	Retired
Louis Stokes (1925–2015)	Ohio's 11th	January 3, 1993	January 3, 1999	Democratic	105th (1997–1999)	Retired
George W. Collins (1925–1972)	Illinois's 6th	November 3, 1970	December 8, 1972	Democratic	91st (1969–1971)	Died in office (Note: Elected to Congress to fill vacancy caused by the death of Daniel Ronan. Collins's wife, Cardiss Collins, filled the vacancy caused by his death.)
George W. Collins (1925–1972)	Illinois's 6th	November 3, 1970	December 8, 1972	Democratic	92nd (1971–1973)	Died in office

=== Modern era, 1971–present ===
Political parties

Democratic Republican

Name	District	Start	End	Party	Congress	Notes
Ron Dellums (1935–2018)	California's 7th	January 3, 1971	January 3, 1975	Democratic	92nd (1971–1973)	Resigned (Note: Served as chair of the Congressional Black Caucus in the 101st United States Congress.)
Ron Dellums (1935–2018)	California's 7th	January 3, 1971	January 3, 1975	Democratic	93rd (1973–1975)	Resigned
Ron Dellums (1935–2018)	California's 8th	January 3, 1975	January 3, 1993	Democratic	94th (1975–1977)	Resigned
Ron Dellums (1935–2018)	California's 8th	January 3, 1975	January 3, 1993	Democratic	THRU	Resigned
Ron Dellums (1935–2018)	California's 8th	January 3, 1975	January 3, 1993	Democratic	102nd (1991–1993)	Resigned
Ron Dellums (1935–2018)	California's 9th	January 3, 1993	February 6, 1998	Democratic	103rd (1993–1995)	Resigned
Ron Dellums (1935–2018)	California's 9th	January 3, 1993	February 6, 1998	Democratic	THRU	Resigned
Ron Dellums (1935–2018)	California's 9th	January 3, 1993	February 6, 1998	Democratic	105th (1997–1999)	Resigned
Ralph Metcalfe (1910–1978)	Illinois's 1st	January 3, 1971	October 10, 1978	Democratic	92nd (1971–1973)	Died in office (Note: First African-American Catholic in the United States Congress. Metcalfe converted to the Catholic Church in 1932, while an undergraduate at Marquette University.)
Ralph Metcalfe (1910–1978)	Illinois's 1st	January 3, 1971	October 10, 1978	Democratic	THRU	Died in office
Ralph Metcalfe (1910–1978)	Illinois's 1st	January 3, 1971	October 10, 1978	Democratic	95th (1977–1979)	Died in office
Parren Mitchell (1922–2007)	Maryland's 7th	January 3, 1971	January 3, 1987	Democratic	92nd (1971–1973)	Retired to run unsuccessfully for Lieutenant Governor of Maryland (Note: First African American to serve in Congress from Maryland. Served as chair of the Congressional Black Caucus in the 95th United States Congress.)
Parren Mitchell (1922–2007)	Maryland's 7th	January 3, 1971	January 3, 1987	Democratic	THRU	Retired to run unsuccessfully for Lieutenant Governor of Maryland
Parren Mitchell (1922–2007)	Maryland's 7th	January 3, 1971	January 3, 1987	Democratic	99th (1985–1987)	Retired to run unsuccessfully for Lieutenant Governor of Maryland
Charles Rangel (1930–2025)	New York's 18th	January 3, 1971	January 3, 1973	Democratic	92nd (1971–1973)	Retired (Note: Served as chair of the Congressional Black Caucus in the 93rd United States Congress during the second session and in the 94th United States Congress during the first session.)
Charles Rangel (1930–2025)	New York's 19th	January 3, 1973	January 3, 1983	Democratic	93rd (1973–1975)	Retired
Charles Rangel (1930–2025)	New York's 19th	January 3, 1973	January 3, 1983	Democratic	THRU	Retired
Charles Rangel (1930–2025)	New York's 19th	January 3, 1973	January 3, 1983	Democratic	97th (1981–1983)	Retired
Charles Rangel (1930–2025)	New York's 16th	January 3, 1983	January 3, 1993	Democratic	98th (1983–1985)	Retired
Charles Rangel (1930–2025)	New York's 16th	January 3, 1983	January 3, 1993	Democratic	THRU	Retired
Charles Rangel (1930–2025)	New York's 16th	January 3, 1983	January 3, 1993	Democratic	102nd (1991–1993)	Retired
Charles Rangel (1930–2025)	New York's 15th	January 3, 1993	January 3, 2013	Democratic	103rd (1993–1995)	Retired
Charles Rangel (1930–2025)	New York's 15th	January 3, 1993	January 3, 2013	Democratic	THRU	Retired
Charles Rangel (1930–2025)	New York's 15th	January 3, 1993	January 3, 2013	Democratic	112th (2011–2013)	Retired
Charles Rangel (1930–2025)	New York's 13th	January 3, 2013	January 3, 2017	Democratic	113th (2013–2015)	Retired
Charles Rangel (1930–2025)	New York's 13th	January 3, 2013	January 3, 2017	Democratic	114th (2015–2017)	Retired
Yvonne Brathwaite Burke (born 1932)	California's 37th	January 3, 1973	January 3, 1975	Democratic	93rd (1973–1975)	Retired to run unsuccessfully for Attorney General of California (Note: First woman to serve as chair of the Congressional Black Caucus in the 94th United States Congress during the second session.)
Yvonne Brathwaite Burke (born 1932)	California's 28th	January 3, 1975	January 3, 1979	Democratic	94th (1975–1977)	Retired to run unsuccessfully for Attorney General of California
Yvonne Brathwaite Burke (born 1932)	California's 28th	January 3, 1975	January 3, 1979	Democratic	95th (1977–1979)	Retired to run unsuccessfully for Attorney General of California
Barbara Jordan (1936–1996)	Texas's 18th	January 3, 1973	January 3, 1979	Democratic	93rd (1973–1975)	Retired (Note: First African American to serve in Congress from Texas. Along with Andrew Young from Georgia, the first African American to serve in Congress from a Southern state since George Henry White from North Carolina in 1901.)
Barbara Jordan (1936–1996)	Texas's 18th	January 3, 1973	January 3, 1979	Democratic	94th (1975–1977)	Retired
Barbara Jordan (1936–1996)	Texas's 18th	January 3, 1973	January 3, 1979	Democratic	95th (1977–1979)	Retired
Andrew Young (born 1932)	Georgia's 5th	January 3, 1973	January 29, 1977	Democratic	93rd (1973–1975)	Resigned to become the United States Ambassador to the United Nations (Note: Along with Barbara Jordan from Texas, the first African American to serve in Congress from a Southern state since George Henry White from North Carolina in 1901.)
Andrew Young (born 1932)	Georgia's 5th	January 3, 1973	January 29, 1977	Democratic	94th (1975–1977)	Resigned to become the United States Ambassador to the United Nations
Andrew Young (born 1932)	Georgia's 5th	January 3, 1973	January 29, 1977	Democratic	95th (1977–1979)	Resigned to become the United States Ambassador to the United Nations
Cardiss Collins (1931–2013)	Illinois's 7th	June 5, 1973	January 3, 1997	Democratic	93rd (1973–1975)	Retired (Note: Elected to fill vacancy caused by the death of her husband, George W. Collins. Served as chair of the Congressional Black Caucus in the 96th United States Congress.)
Cardiss Collins (1931–2013)	Illinois's 7th	June 5, 1973	January 3, 1997	Democratic	THRU	Retired
Cardiss Collins (1931–2013)	Illinois's 7th	June 5, 1973	January 3, 1997	Democratic	104th (1995–1997)	Retired
Harold Ford Sr. (born 1945)	Tennessee's 8th	January 3, 1975	January 3, 1983	Democratic	94th (1975–1977)	Retired (Note: His son, Harold Ford Jr. succeeded him in office. First African American to serve in Congress from Tennessee.)
Harold Ford Sr. (born 1945)	Tennessee's 8th	January 3, 1975	January 3, 1983	Democratic	THRU	Retired
Harold Ford Sr. (born 1945)	Tennessee's 8th	January 3, 1975	January 3, 1983	Democratic	97th (1981–1983)	Retired
Harold Ford Sr. (born 1945)	Tennessee's 9th	January 3, 1983	January 3, 1997	Democratic	98th (1983–1985)	Retired
Harold Ford Sr. (born 1945)	Tennessee's 9th	January 3, 1983	January 3, 1997	Democratic	THRU	Retired
Harold Ford Sr. (born 1945)	Tennessee's 9th	January 3, 1983	January 3, 1997	Democratic	104th (1995–1997)	Retired
Julian Dixon (1934–2000)	California's 28th	January 3, 1979	January 3, 1993	Democratic	96th (1979–1981)	Died in office (Note: Served as chair of the Congressional Black Caucus in the 98th United States Congress.)
Julian Dixon (1934–2000)	California's 28th	January 3, 1979	January 3, 1993	Democratic	THRU	Died in office
Julian Dixon (1934–2000)	California's 28th	January 3, 1979	January 3, 1993	Democratic	102nd (1991–1993)	Died in office
Julian Dixon (1934–2000)	California's 32nd	January 3, 1993	December 8, 2000	Democratic	103rd (1993–1995)	Died in office
Julian Dixon (1934–2000)	California's 32nd	January 3, 1993	December 8, 2000	Democratic	THRU	Died in office
Julian Dixon (1934–2000)	California's 32nd	January 3, 1993	December 8, 2000	Democratic	106th (1999–2001)	Died in office
William H. Gray III (1941–2013)	Pennsylvania's 2nd	January 3, 1979	September 11, 1991	Democratic	96th (1979–1981)	Resigned to become President of the United Negro College Fund (Note: Served as chair for the House Democratic Caucus during the 101st United States Congress and House Democratic Whip during the 102nd United States Congress.)
William H. Gray III (1941–2013)	Pennsylvania's 2nd	January 3, 1979	September 11, 1991	Democratic	THRU	Resigned to become President of the United Negro College Fund
William H. Gray III (1941–2013)	Pennsylvania's 2nd	January 3, 1979	September 11, 1991	Democratic	102nd (1991–1993)	Resigned to become President of the United Negro College Fund
Mickey Leland (1944–1989)	Texas's 18th	January 3, 1979	August 7, 1989	Democratic	96th (1979–1981)	Died in office (Note: Served as chair for the Congressional Black Caucus in the 99th United States Congress.)
Mickey Leland (1944–1989)	Texas's 18th	January 3, 1979	August 7, 1989	Democratic	THRU	Died in office
Mickey Leland (1944–1989)	Texas's 18th	January 3, 1979	August 7, 1989	Democratic	101st (1989–1991)	Died in office
Bennett Stewart (1912–1988)	Illinois's 1st	January 3, 1979	January 3, 1981	Democratic	96th (1979–1981)	Lost renomination
George Crockett Jr. (1909–1997)	Michigan's 13th	November 4, 1980	January 3, 1991	Democratic	96th (1979–1981)	Retired (Note: Elected to fill vacancy caused by the resignation of Charles Diggs.)
George Crockett Jr. (1909–1997)	Michigan's 13th	November 4, 1980	January 3, 1991	Democratic	THRU	Retired
George Crockett Jr. (1909–1997)	Michigan's 13th	November 4, 1980	January 3, 1991	Democratic	101st (1989–1991)	Retired
Mervyn Dymally (1926–2012)	California's 31st	January 3, 1981	January 3, 1993	Democratic	97th (1981–1983)	Retired (Note: Served as chair of the Congressional Black Caucus in the 100th United States Congress.)
Mervyn Dymally (1926–2012)	California's 31st	January 3, 1981	January 3, 1993	Democratic	THRU	Retired
Mervyn Dymally (1926–2012)	California's 31st	January 3, 1981	January 3, 1993	Democratic	102nd (1991–1993)	Retired
Gus Savage (1925–2015)	Illinois's 2nd	January 3, 1981	January 3, 1993	Democratic	97th (1981–1983)	Lost renomination
Gus Savage (1925–2015)	Illinois's 2nd	January 3, 1981	January 3, 1993	Democratic	THRU	Lost renomination
Gus Savage (1925–2015)	Illinois's 2nd	January 3, 1981	January 3, 1993	Democratic	102nd (1991–1993)	Lost renomination
Harold Washington (1922–1987)	Illinois's 1st	January 3, 1981	April 30, 1983	Democratic	97th (1981–1983)	Resigned to become Mayor of Chicago
Harold Washington (1922–1987)	Illinois's 1st	January 3, 1981	April 30, 1983	Democratic	98th (1983–1985)	Resigned to become Mayor of Chicago
Katie Hall (1938–2012)	Indiana's 1st	November 2, 1982	January 3, 1985	Democratic	97th (1981–1983)	Lost renomination (Note: Elected to Congress to fill vacancy caused by the death of Adam Benjamin Jr. First African American to serve in Congress from Indiana.)
Katie Hall (1938–2012)	Indiana's 1st	November 2, 1982	January 3, 1985	Democratic	98th (1983–1985)	Lost renomination
Major Owens (1936–2013)	New York's 12th	January 3, 1983	January 3, 1993	Democratic	98th (1983–1985)	Retired
Major Owens (1936–2013)	New York's 12th	January 3, 1983	January 3, 1993	Democratic	THRU	Retired
Major Owens (1936–2013)	New York's 12th	January 3, 1983	January 3, 1993	Democratic	102nd (1991–1993)	Retired
Major Owens (1936–2013)	New York's 11th	January 3, 1993	January 3, 2007	Democratic	103rd (1993–1995)	Retired
Major Owens (1936–2013)	New York's 11th	January 3, 1993	January 3, 2007	Democratic	THRU	Retired
Major Owens (1936–2013)	New York's 11th	January 3, 1993	January 3, 2007	Democratic	109th (2005–2007)	Retired
Edolphus Towns (born 1934)	New York's 11th	January 3, 1983	January 3, 1993	Democratic	98th (1983–1985)	Retired (Note: Served as chair of the Congressional Black Caucus in the 102nd United States Congress.)
Edolphus Towns (born 1934)	New York's 11th	January 3, 1983	January 3, 1993	Democratic	THRU	Retired
Edolphus Towns (born 1934)	New York's 11th	January 3, 1983	January 3, 1993	Democratic	102nd (1991–1993)	Retired
Edolphus Towns (born 1934)	New York's 10th	January 3, 1993	January 3, 2013	Democratic	103rd (1993–1995)	Retired
Edolphus Towns (born 1934)	New York's 10th	January 3, 1993	January 3, 2013	Democratic	THRU	Retired
Edolphus Towns (born 1934)	New York's 10th	January 3, 1993	January 3, 2013	Democratic	112th (2011–2013)	Retired
Alan Wheat (born 1951)	Missouri's 5th	January 3, 1983	January 3, 1995	Democratic	98th (1983–1985)	Retired to run unsuccessfully for the United States Senate
Alan Wheat (born 1951)	Missouri's 5th	January 3, 1983	January 3, 1995	Democratic	THRU	Retired to run unsuccessfully for the United States Senate
Alan Wheat (born 1951)	Missouri's 5th	January 3, 1983	January 3, 1995	Democratic	103rd (1993–1995)	Retired to run unsuccessfully for the United States Senate
Charles Hayes (1918–1997)	Illinois's 1st	August 23, 1983	January 3, 1993	Democratic	98th (1983–1985)	Lost renomination (Note: Elected to fill vacancy caused by resignation of Harold Washington.)
Charles Hayes (1918–1997)	Illinois's 1st	August 23, 1983	January 3, 1993	Democratic	THRU	Lost renomination
Charles Hayes (1918–1997)	Illinois's 1st	August 23, 1983	January 3, 1993	Democratic	102nd (1991–1993)	Lost renomination
Alton Waldon (1936–2023)	New York's 6th	June 10, 1986	January 3, 1987	Democratic	99th (1985–1987)	Lost renomination (Note: Elected to Congress to fill vacancy caused by the death of Joseph Addabbo.)
Mike Espy (born 1953)	Mississippi's 2nd	January 3, 1987	January 22, 1993	Democratic	100th (1987–1989)	Resigned to become the United States Secretary of Agriculture
Mike Espy (born 1953)	Mississippi's 2nd	January 3, 1987	January 22, 1993	Democratic	THRU	Resigned to become the United States Secretary of Agriculture
Mike Espy (born 1953)	Mississippi's 2nd	January 3, 1987	January 22, 1993	Democratic	103rd (1993–1995)	Resigned to become the United States Secretary of Agriculture
Floyd Flake (born 1945)	New York's 6th	January 3, 1987	November 17, 1997	Democratic	100th (1987–1989)	Resigned to become a pastor at the Allen African Methodist Episcopal Church
Floyd Flake (born 1945)	New York's 6th	January 3, 1987	November 17, 1997	Democratic	THRU	Resigned to become a pastor at the Allen African Methodist Episcopal Church
Floyd Flake (born 1945)	New York's 6th	January 3, 1987	November 17, 1997	Democratic	105th (1997–1999)	Resigned to become a pastor at the Allen African Methodist Episcopal Church
John Lewis (1940–2020)	Georgia's 5th	January 3, 1987	July 17, 2020	Democratic	100th (1987–1989)	Died in office (Note: Served as Democratic chief whip in the 102nd through 109th Congresses. Also, served as the Democratic Senior Chief Deputy Whip in the 110th through 112th Congresses.)
John Lewis (1940–2020)	Georgia's 5th	January 3, 1987	July 17, 2020	Democratic	THRU	Died in office
John Lewis (1940–2020)	Georgia's 5th	January 3, 1987	July 17, 2020	Democratic	116th (2019–2021)	Died in office
Kweisi Mfume (born 1948)	Maryland's 7th	January 3, 1987	February 15, 1996	Democratic	100th (1987–1989)	Resigned to become Executive Director of the National Association for the Advancement of Colored People (NAACP) (Note: Served as chair of the Congressional Black Caucus in the 103rd United States Congress. Also, served as co-chair of the Democratic Policy Committee in the 104th United States Congress. Subsequently elected to fill vacancy caused by death of Elijah Cummings.)
Kweisi Mfume (born 1948)	Maryland's 7th	January 3, 1987	February 15, 1996	Democratic	THRU	Resigned to become Executive Director of the National Association for the Advancement of Colored People (NAACP)
Kweisi Mfume (born 1948)	Maryland's 7th	January 3, 1987	February 15, 1996	Democratic	104th (1995–1997)	Resigned to become Executive Director of the National Association for the Advancement of Colored People (NAACP)
Kweisi Mfume (born 1948)	Maryland's 7th	May 5, 2020	Incumbent	Democratic	116th (2019–2021)	
Kweisi Mfume (born 1948)	Maryland's 7th	May 5, 2020	Incumbent	Democratic	THRU	
Kweisi Mfume (born 1948)	Maryland's 7th	May 5, 2020	Incumbent	Democratic	119th (2025–2027)	
Donald M. Payne (1934–2012)	New Jersey's 10th	January 3, 1989	March 6, 2012	Democratic	101st (1989–1991)	Died in office (Note: His son, Donald Payne Jr., succeeded him in office. First African American to serve in Congress from New Jersey. Served as chair of the Congressional Black Caucus in the 104th United States Congress.)
Donald M. Payne (1934–2012)	New Jersey's 10th	January 3, 1989	March 6, 2012	Democratic	THRU	Died in office
Donald M. Payne (1934–2012)	New Jersey's 10th	January 3, 1989	March 6, 2012	Democratic	112th (2011–2013)	Died in office
Craig Washington (born 1941)	Texas's 18th	December 9, 1989	January 3, 1995	Democratic	101st (1989–1991)	Lost renomination (Note: Elected to office to fill vacancy caused by death of Mickey Leland.)
Craig Washington (born 1941)	Texas's 18th	December 9, 1989	January 3, 1995	Democratic	102nd (1991–1993)	Lost renomination
Craig Washington (born 1941)	Texas's 18th	December 9, 1989	January 3, 1995	Democratic	103rd (1993–1995)	Lost renomination
Barbara-Rose Collins (1939–2021)	Michigan's 13th	January 3, 1991	January 3, 1993	Democratic	102nd (1991–1993)	Lost renomination
Barbara-Rose Collins (1939–2021)	Michigan's 15th	January 3, 1993	January 3, 1997	Democratic	103rd (1993–1995)	Lost renomination
Barbara-Rose Collins (1939–2021)	Michigan's 15th	January 3, 1993	January 3, 1997	Democratic	104th (1995–1997)	Lost renomination
Gary Franks (born 1953)	Connecticut's 5th	January 3, 1991	January 3, 1997	Republican	102nd (1991–1993)	Lost reelection (Note: First African American to serve in Congress from Connecticut.)
Gary Franks (born 1953)	Connecticut's 5th	January 3, 1991	January 3, 1997	Republican	103rd (1993–1995)	Lost reelection
Gary Franks (born 1953)	Connecticut's 5th	January 3, 1991	January 3, 1997	Republican	104th (1995–1997)	Lost reelection
William J. Jefferson (born 1947)	Louisiana's 2nd	January 3, 1991	January 3, 2009	Democratic	102nd (1991–1993)	Lost reelection after being indicted for bribery, of which he was later convicted
William J. Jefferson (born 1947)	Louisiana's 2nd	January 3, 1991	January 3, 2009	Democratic	THRU	Lost reelection after being indicted for bribery, of which he was later convicted
William J. Jefferson (born 1947)	Louisiana's 2nd	January 3, 1991	January 3, 2009	Democratic	110th (2007–2009)	Lost reelection after being indicted for bribery, of which he was later convicted
Maxine Waters (born 1938)	California's 29th	January 3, 1991	January 3, 1993	Democratic	102nd (1991–1993)	(Note: Served as chair of the Congressional Black Caucus in the 105th United States Congress. Served as vice chair of the Democratic Steering Committee in the 105th through 108th Congresses. Served as Democratic chief deputy whip in the 106th through 112th Congresses.)
Maxine Waters (born 1938)	California's 35th	January 3, 1993	January 3, 2013	Democratic	103rd (1993–1995)	(Note: Served as chair of the Congressional Black Caucus in the 105th United States Congress. Served as vice chair of the Democratic Steering Committee in the 105th through 108th Congresses. Served as Democratic chief deputy whip in the 106th through 112th Congresses.)
Maxine Waters (born 1938)	California's 35th	January 3, 1993	January 3, 2013	Democratic	THRU	(Note: Served as chair of the Congressional Black Caucus in the 105th United States Congress. Served as vice chair of the Democratic Steering Committee in the 105th through 108th Congresses. Served as Democratic chief deputy whip in the 106th through 112th Congresses.)
Maxine Waters (born 1938)	California's 35th	January 3, 1993	January 3, 2013	Democratic	112th (2011–2013)	(Note: Served as chair of the Congressional Black Caucus in the 105th United States Congress. Served as vice chair of the Democratic Steering Committee in the 105th through 108th Congresses. Served as Democratic chief deputy whip in the 106th through 112th Congresses.)
Maxine Waters (born 1938)	California's 43rd	January 3, 2013	Incumbent	Democratic	113th (2013–2015)	(Note: Served as chair of the Congressional Black Caucus in the 105th United States Congress. Served as vice chair of the Democratic Steering Committee in the 105th through 108th Congresses. Served as Democratic chief deputy whip in the 106th through 112th Congresses.)
Maxine Waters (born 1938)	California's 43rd	January 3, 2013	Incumbent	Democratic	THRU	(Note: Served as chair of the Congressional Black Caucus in the 105th United States Congress. Served as vice chair of the Democratic Steering Committee in the 105th through 108th Congresses. Served as Democratic chief deputy whip in the 106th through 112th Congresses.)
Maxine Waters (born 1938)	California's 43rd	January 3, 2013	Incumbent	Democratic	119th (2025–2027)	(Note: Served as chair of the Congressional Black Caucus in the 105th United States Congress. Served as vice chair of the Democratic Steering Committee in the 105th through 108th Congresses. Served as Democratic chief deputy whip in the 106th through 112th Congresses.)
Lucien Blackwell (1931–2003)	Pennsylvania's 2nd	November 5, 1991	January 3, 1995	Democratic	102nd (1991–1993)	Lost renomination (Note: Elected to fill vacancy caused by the resignation of William H. Gray.)
Lucien Blackwell (1931–2003)	Pennsylvania's 2nd	November 5, 1991	January 3, 1995	Democratic	103rd (1993–1995)	Lost renomination
Eva Clayton (born 1934)	North Carolina's 1st	November 3, 1992	January 3, 2003	Democratic	102nd (1991–1993)	Retired (Note: Elected to fill vacancy caused by death of Walter B. Jones Sr. Served as co-chair of the Democratic Policy Committee in the 104th United States Congress.)
Eva Clayton (born 1934)	North Carolina's 1st	November 3, 1992	January 3, 2003	Democratic	THRU	Retired
Eva Clayton (born 1934)	North Carolina's 1st	November 3, 1992	January 3, 2003	Democratic	107th (2001–2003)	Retired
Sanford Bishop (born 1947)	Georgia's 2nd	January 3, 1993	Incumbent	Democratic	103rd (1993–1995)	
Sanford Bishop (born 1947)	Georgia's 2nd	January 3, 1993	Incumbent	Democratic	THRU	
Sanford Bishop (born 1947)	Georgia's 2nd	January 3, 1993	Incumbent	Democratic	119th (2025–2027)	
Corrine Brown (born 1946)	Florida's 3rd	January 3, 1993	January 3, 2013	Democratic	103rd (1993–1995)	Lost renomination after being indicted for fraud and tax-evasion, of which she was later convicted
Corrine Brown (born 1946)	Florida's 3rd	January 3, 1993	January 3, 2013	Democratic	THRU	Lost renomination after being indicted for fraud and tax-evasion, of which she was later convicted
Corrine Brown (born 1946)	Florida's 3rd	January 3, 1993	January 3, 2013	Democratic	112th (2011–2013)	Lost renomination after being indicted for fraud and tax-evasion, of which she was later convicted
Corrine Brown (born 1946)	Florida's 5th	January 3, 2013	January 3, 2017	Democratic	113th (2013–2015)	Lost renomination after being indicted for fraud and tax-evasion, of which she was later convicted
Corrine Brown (born 1946)	Florida's 5th	January 3, 2013	January 3, 2017	Democratic	114th (2015–2017)	Lost renomination after being indicted for fraud and tax-evasion, of which she was later convicted
Jim Clyburn (born 1940)	South Carolina's 6th	January 3, 1993	Incumbent	Democratic	103rd (1993–1995)	(Note: Served as chair of the Congressional Black Caucus in the 106th United States Congress. Served as vice chair of the House Democratic Caucus in the 108th through 109th Congresses. Served as House majority whip in the 110th through 111th Congresses. Served as the Assistant Democratic Leader in the 112th United States Congress. Distant relative of George W. Murray.)
Jim Clyburn (born 1940)	South Carolina's 6th	January 3, 1993	Incumbent	Democratic	THRU	(Note: Served as chair of the Congressional Black Caucus in the 106th United States Congress. Served as vice chair of the House Democratic Caucus in the 108th through 109th Congresses. Served as House majority whip in the 110th through 111th Congresses. Served as the Assistant Democratic Leader in the 112th United States Congress. Distant relative of George W. Murray.)
Jim Clyburn (born 1940)	South Carolina's 6th	January 3, 1993	Incumbent	Democratic	119th (2025–2027)	(Note: Served as chair of the Congressional Black Caucus in the 106th United States Congress. Served as vice chair of the House Democratic Caucus in the 108th through 109th Congresses. Served as House majority whip in the 110th through 111th Congresses. Served as the Assistant Democratic Leader in the 112th United States Congress. Distant relative of George W. Murray.)
Cleo Fields (born 1962)	Louisiana's 4th	January 3, 1993	January 3, 1997	Democratic	103rd (1993–1995)	Retired (Note: Youngest member of the 103rd United States Congress at age 30.)
Cleo Fields (born 1962)	Louisiana's 4th	January 3, 1993	January 3, 1997	Democratic	104th (1995–1997)	Retired
Cleo Fields (born 1962)	Louisiana's 6th	January 3, 2025	January 3, 2027	Democratic	119th (2025–2027)	Retiring
Alcee Hastings (1936–2021)	Florida's 23rd	January 3, 1993	January 3, 2013	Democratic	103rd (1993–1995)	Died in office
Alcee Hastings (1936–2021)	Florida's 23rd	January 3, 1993	January 3, 2013	Democratic	THRU	Died in office
Alcee Hastings (1936–2021)	Florida's 23rd	January 3, 1993	January 3, 2013	Democratic	112th (2011–2013)	Died in office
Alcee Hastings (1936–2021)	Florida's 20th	January 3, 2013	April 6, 2021	Democratic	113th (2013–2015)	Died in office
Alcee Hastings (1936–2021)	Florida's 20th	January 3, 2013	April 6, 2021	Democratic	THRU	Died in office
Alcee Hastings (1936–2021)	Florida's 20th	January 3, 2013	April 6, 2021	Democratic	117th (2021–2023)	Died in office
Earl Hilliard (born 1942)	Alabama's 7th	January 3, 1993	January 3, 2003	Democratic	103rd (1993–1995)	Lost renomination
Earl Hilliard (born 1942)	Alabama's 7th	January 3, 1993	January 3, 2003	Democratic	THRU	Lost renomination
Earl Hilliard (born 1942)	Alabama's 7th	January 3, 1993	January 3, 2003	Democratic	107th (2001–2003)	Lost renomination
Eddie Bernice Johnson (1934–2023)	Texas's 30th	January 3, 1993	January 3, 2023	Democratic	103rd (1993–1995)	Retired (Note: Served as chair of the Congressional Black Caucus in the 107th United States Congress.)
Eddie Bernice Johnson (1934–2023)	Texas's 30th	January 3, 1993	January 3, 2023	Democratic	THRU	Retired
Eddie Bernice Johnson (1934–2023)	Texas's 30th	January 3, 1993	January 3, 2023	Democratic	117th (2021–2023)	Retired
Cynthia McKinney (born 1955)	Georgia's 11th	January 3, 1993	January 3, 1997	Democratic	103rd (1993–1995)	Lost renomination in 2002 and 2006 (Note: First African-American woman to serve in Congress from Georgia.)
Cynthia McKinney (born 1955)	Georgia's 11th	January 3, 1993	January 3, 1997	Democratic	104th (1995–1997)	Lost renomination in 2002 and 2006
Cynthia McKinney (born 1955)	Georgia's 4th	January 3, 1997	January 3, 2003	Democratic	105th (1997–1999)	Lost renomination in 2002 and 2006
Cynthia McKinney (born 1955)	Georgia's 4th	January 3, 1997	January 3, 2003	Democratic	THRU	Lost renomination in 2002 and 2006
Cynthia McKinney (born 1955)	Georgia's 4th	January 3, 1997	January 3, 2003	Democratic	107th (2001–2003)	Lost renomination in 2002 and 2006
Cynthia McKinney (born 1955)	Georgia's 4th	January 3, 2005	January 3, 2007	Democratic	109th (2005–2007)	Lost renomination in 2002 and 2006
Carrie Meek (1926–2021)	Florida's 17th	January 3, 1993	January 3, 2003	Democratic	103rd (1993–1995)	Retired (Note: Her son, Kendrick Meek, succeeded her in office.)
Carrie Meek (1926–2021)	Florida's 17th	January 3, 1993	January 3, 2003	Democratic	THRU	Retired
Carrie Meek (1926–2021)	Florida's 17th	January 3, 1993	January 3, 2003	Democratic	107th (2001–2003)	Retired
Mel Reynolds (born 1952)	Illinois's 2nd	January 3, 1993	October 1, 1995	Democratic	103rd (1993–1995)	Resigned after being convicted on 12 counts of sexual assault, obstruction of justice and solicitation of child pornography and being sentenced to five years in prison
Mel Reynolds (born 1952)	Illinois's 2nd	January 3, 1993	October 1, 1995	Democratic	104th (1995–1997)	Resigned after being convicted on 12 counts of sexual assault, obstruction of justice and solicitation of child pornography and being sentenced to five years in prison
Bobby Rush (born 1946)	Illinois's 1st	January 3, 1993	January 3, 2023	Democratic	103rd (1993–1995)	Retired
Bobby Rush (born 1946)	Illinois's 1st	January 3, 1993	January 3, 2023	Democratic	THRU	Retired
Bobby Rush (born 1946)	Illinois's 1st	January 3, 1993	January 3, 2023	Democratic	117th (2021–2023)	Retired
Bobby Scott (born 1947)	Virginia's 3rd	January 3, 1993	Incumbent	Democratic	103rd (1993–1995)	
Bobby Scott (born 1947)	Virginia's 3rd	January 3, 1993	Incumbent	Democratic	THRU	
Bobby Scott (born 1947)	Virginia's 3rd	January 3, 1993	Incumbent	Democratic	119th (2025–2027)	
Walter R. Tucker III (born 1957)	California's 37th	January 3, 1993	December 15, 1995	Democratic	103rd (1993–1995)	Resigned after being convicted of tax-evasion and extortion (Note: Tucker was sentenced to 27 months in prison.)
Walter R. Tucker III (born 1957)	California's 37th	January 3, 1993	December 15, 1995	Democratic	104th (1995–1997)	Resigned after being convicted of tax-evasion and extortion
Mel Watt (born 1945)	North Carolina's 12th	January 3, 1993	January 6, 2014	Democratic	103rd (1993–1995)	Resigned to become Director of the Federal Housing Finance Agency (Note: Served as chair of the Congressional Black Caucus in the 109th United States Congress.)
Mel Watt (born 1945)	North Carolina's 12th	January 3, 1993	January 6, 2014	Democratic	THRU	Resigned to become Director of the Federal Housing Finance Agency
Mel Watt (born 1945)	North Carolina's 12th	January 3, 1993	January 6, 2014	Democratic	113th (2013–2015)	Resigned to become Director of the Federal Housing Finance Agency
Albert Wynn (born 1951)	Maryland's 4th	January 3, 1993	May 31, 2008	Democratic	103rd (1993–1995)	Resigned after losing renomination
Albert Wynn (born 1951)	Maryland's 4th	January 3, 1993	May 31, 2008	Democratic	THRU	Resigned after losing renomination
Albert Wynn (born 1951)	Maryland's 4th	January 3, 1993	May 31, 2008	Democratic	110th (2007–2009)	Resigned after losing renomination
Bennie Thompson (born 1948)	Mississippi's 2nd	April 13, 1993	Incumbent	Democratic	103rd (1993–1995)	(Note: Elected to fill vacancy caused by resignation of Mike Espy.)
Bennie Thompson (born 1948)	Mississippi's 2nd	April 13, 1993	Incumbent	Democratic	THRU	(Note: Elected to fill vacancy caused by resignation of Mike Espy.)
Bennie Thompson (born 1948)	Mississippi's 2nd	April 13, 1993	Incumbent	Democratic	119th (2025–2027)	(Note: Elected to fill vacancy caused by resignation of Mike Espy.)
Chaka Fattah (born 1956)	Pennsylvania's 2nd	January 3, 1995	June 23, 2016	Democratic	104th (1995–1997)	Resigned following loss of renomination and convictions for racketeering, fraud, and money laundering
Chaka Fattah (born 1956)	Pennsylvania's 2nd	January 3, 1995	June 23, 2016	Democratic	THRU	Resigned following loss of renomination and convictions for racketeering, fraud, and money laundering
Chaka Fattah (born 1956)	Pennsylvania's 2nd	January 3, 1995	June 23, 2016	Democratic	114th (2015–2017)	Resigned following loss of renomination and convictions for racketeering, fraud, and money laundering
Sheila Jackson Lee (1950–2024)	Texas's 18th	January 3, 1995	July 19, 2024	Democratic	104th (1995–1997)	Died in office
Sheila Jackson Lee (1950–2024)	Texas's 18th	January 3, 1995	July 19, 2024	Democratic	THRU	Died in office
Sheila Jackson Lee (1950–2024)	Texas's 18th	January 3, 1995	July 19, 2024	Democratic	118th (2023–2025)	Died in office
J. C. Watts (born 1957)	Oklahoma's 4th	January 3, 1995	January 3, 2003	Republican	104th (1995–1997)	Retired from office (Note: First African American to serve in Congress from Oklahoma. Served as chair of the House Republican Conference in the 106th through 107th Congresses.)
J. C. Watts (born 1957)	Oklahoma's 4th	January 3, 1995	January 3, 2003	Republican	THRU	Retired from office
J. C. Watts (born 1957)	Oklahoma's 4th	January 3, 1995	January 3, 2003	Republican	107th (2001–2003)	Retired from office
Jesse Jackson Jr. (born 1965)	Illinois's 2nd	December 12, 1995	November 21, 2012	Democratic	104th (1995–1997)	Resigned after being convicted of wire and mail fraud (Note: He was sentenced to 30 months in federal prison. Elected to fill vacancy caused by resignation of Mel Reynolds.)
Jesse Jackson Jr. (born 1965)	Illinois's 2nd	December 12, 1995	November 21, 2012	Democratic	THRU	Resigned after being convicted of wire and mail fraud
Jesse Jackson Jr. (born 1965)	Illinois's 2nd	December 12, 1995	November 21, 2012	Democratic	112th (2011–2013)	Resigned after being convicted of wire and mail fraud
Juanita Millender-McDonald (1938–2007)	California's 37th	March 26, 1996	April 22, 2007	Democratic	104th (1995–1997)	Died in office (Note: Elected to fill vacancy caused by resignation of Walter Tucker.)
Juanita Millender-McDonald (1938–2007)	California's 37th	March 26, 1996	April 22, 2007	Democratic	THRU	Died in office
Juanita Millender-McDonald (1938–2007)	California's 37th	March 26, 1996	April 22, 2007	Democratic	110th (2007–2009)	Died in office
Elijah Cummings (1951–2019)	Maryland's 7th	April 16, 1996	October 17, 2019	Democratic	104th (1995–1997)	Died in office (Note: Elected to fill vacancy caused by resignation of Kweisi Mfume. Served as chair of the Congressional Black Caucus in the 108th United States Congress.)
Elijah Cummings (1951–2019)	Maryland's 7th	April 16, 1996	October 17, 2019	Democratic	THRU	Died in office
Elijah Cummings (1951–2019)	Maryland's 7th	April 16, 1996	October 17, 2019	Democratic	116th (2019–2021)	Died in office
Julia Carson (1938–2007)	Indiana's 10th	January 3, 1997	January 3, 2003	Democratic	105th (1997–1999)	Died in office (Note: Carson's grandson, André Carson, filled the vacancy caused by her death.)
Julia Carson (1938–2007)	Indiana's 10th	January 3, 1997	January 3, 2003	Democratic	THRU	Died in office
Julia Carson (1938–2007)	Indiana's 10th	January 3, 1997	January 3, 2003	Democratic	107th (2001–2003)	Died in office
Julia Carson (1938–2007)	Indiana's 7th	January 3, 2003	December 15, 2007	Democratic	108th (2003–2005)	Died in office
Julia Carson (1938–2007)	Indiana's 7th	January 3, 2003	December 15, 2007	Democratic	THRU	Died in office
Julia Carson (1938–2007)	Indiana's 7th	January 3, 2003	December 15, 2007	Democratic	110th (2007–2009)	Died in office
Danny Davis (born 1941)	Illinois's 7th	January 3, 1997	January 3, 2027	Democratic	105th (1997–1999)	Retiring
Danny Davis (born 1941)	Illinois's 7th	January 3, 1997	January 3, 2027	Democratic	THRU	Retiring
Danny Davis (born 1941)	Illinois's 7th	January 3, 1997	January 3, 2027	Democratic	119th (2025–2027)	Retiring
Harold Ford Jr. (born 1970)	Tennessee's 9th	January 3, 1997	January 3, 2007	Democratic	105th (1997–1999)	Retired to run unsuccessfully for the United States Senate (Note: Succeeded his father, Harold Ford Sr., in office. Youngest member of the 105th United States Congress at age 26.)
Harold Ford Jr. (born 1970)	Tennessee's 9th	January 3, 1997	January 3, 2007	Democratic	THRU	Retired to run unsuccessfully for the United States Senate
Harold Ford Jr. (born 1970)	Tennessee's 9th	January 3, 1997	January 3, 2007	Democratic	109th (2005–2007)	Retired to run unsuccessfully for the United States Senate
Carolyn Cheeks Kilpatrick (1945–2025)	Michigan's 15th	January 3, 1997	January 3, 2003	Democratic	105th (1997–1999)	Lost renomination (Note: Served as chair of the Congressional Black Caucus in the 110th United States Congress.)
Carolyn Cheeks Kilpatrick (1945–2025)	Michigan's 15th	January 3, 1997	January 3, 2003	Democratic	THRU	Lost renomination
Carolyn Cheeks Kilpatrick (1945–2025)	Michigan's 15th	January 3, 1997	January 3, 2003	Democratic	107th (2001–2003)	Lost renomination
Carolyn Cheeks Kilpatrick (1945–2025)	Michigan's 13th	January 3, 2003	January 3, 2011	Democratic	108th (2003–2005)	Lost renomination
Carolyn Cheeks Kilpatrick (1945–2025)	Michigan's 13th	January 3, 2003	January 3, 2011	Democratic	THRU	Lost renomination
Carolyn Cheeks Kilpatrick (1945–2025)	Michigan's 13th	January 3, 2003	January 3, 2011	Democratic	111th (2009–2011)	Lost renomination
Gregory Meeks (born 1953)	New York's 6th	February 3, 1998	January 3, 2013	Democratic	105th (1997–1999)	(Note: Elected to fill vacancy caused by resignation of Floyd H. Flake.)
Gregory Meeks (born 1953)	New York's 6th	February 3, 1998	January 3, 2013	Democratic	THRU	(Note: Elected to fill vacancy caused by resignation of Floyd H. Flake.)
Gregory Meeks (born 1953)	New York's 6th	February 3, 1998	January 3, 2013	Democratic	112th (2011–2013)	(Note: Elected to fill vacancy caused by resignation of Floyd H. Flake.)
Gregory Meeks (born 1953)	New York's 5th	January 3, 2013	Incumbent	Democratic	113th (2013–2015)	(Note: Elected to fill vacancy caused by resignation of Floyd H. Flake.)
Gregory Meeks (born 1953)	New York's 5th	January 3, 2013	Incumbent	Democratic	THRU	(Note: Elected to fill vacancy caused by resignation of Floyd H. Flake.)
Gregory Meeks (born 1953)	New York's 5th	January 3, 2013	Incumbent	Democratic	119th (2025–2027)	(Note: Elected to fill vacancy caused by resignation of Floyd H. Flake.)
Barbara Lee (born 1946)	California's 9th	April 7, 1998	January 3, 2013	Democratic	105th (1997–1999)	Retired to run unsuccessfully for the United States Senate (Note: Elected to fill vacancy caused by resignation of Ron Dellums. Served as chair of the Congressional Black Caucus in the 111th United States Congress.)
Barbara Lee (born 1946)	California's 9th	April 7, 1998	January 3, 2013	Democratic	THRU	Retired to run unsuccessfully for the United States Senate
Barbara Lee (born 1946)	California's 9th	April 7, 1998	January 3, 2013	Democratic	112th (2011–2013)	Retired to run unsuccessfully for the United States Senate
Barbara Lee (born 1946)	California's 13th	January 3, 2013	January 3, 2023	Democratic	113th (2013–2015)	Retired to run unsuccessfully for the United States Senate
Barbara Lee (born 1946)	California's 13th	January 3, 2013	January 3, 2023	Democratic	THRU	Retired to run unsuccessfully for the United States Senate
Barbara Lee (born 1946)	California's 13th	January 3, 2013	January 3, 2023	Democratic	117th (2021–2023)	Retired to run unsuccessfully for the United States Senate
Barbara Lee (born 1946)	California's 12th	January 3, 2023	January 3, 2025	Democratic	118th (2023–2025)	Retired to run unsuccessfully for the United States Senate
Stephanie Tubbs Jones (1949–2008)	Ohio's 11th	January 3, 1999	August 20, 2008	Democratic	106th (1999–2001)	Died in office
Stephanie Tubbs Jones (1949–2008)	Ohio's 11th	January 3, 1999	August 20, 2008	Democratic	THRU	Died in office
Stephanie Tubbs Jones (1949–2008)	Ohio's 11th	January 3, 1999	August 20, 2008	Democratic	110th (2007–2009)	Died in office
Lacy Clay (born 1956)	Missouri's 1st	January 3, 2001	January 3, 2021	Democratic	107th (2001–2003)	Lost renomination (Note: Succeeded his father, Bill Clay, in office.)
Lacy Clay (born 1956)	Missouri's 1st	January 3, 2001	January 3, 2021	Democratic	THRU	Lost renomination
Lacy Clay (born 1956)	Missouri's 1st	January 3, 2001	January 3, 2021	Democratic	116th (2019–2021)	Lost renomination
Diane Watson (born 1933)	California's 32nd	June 5, 2001	January 3, 2003	Democratic	107th (2001–2003)	Retired (Note: Elected to fill vacancy caused by death of Julian C. Dixon.)
Diane Watson (born 1933)	California's 33rd	January 3, 2003	January 3, 2011	Democratic	108th (2003–2005)	Retired
Diane Watson (born 1933)	California's 33rd	January 3, 2003	January 3, 2011	Democratic	THRU	Retired
Diane Watson (born 1933)	California's 33rd	January 3, 2003	January 3, 2011	Democratic	111th (2009–2011)	Retired
Frank Ballance (1942–2019)	North Carolina's 1st	January 3, 2003	June 11, 2004	Democratic	108th (2003–2005)	Resigned after being convicted of mail fraud and money laundering
Artur Davis (born 1967)	Alabama's 7th	January 3, 2003	January 3, 2011	Democratic	108th (2003–2005)	Retired to run unsuccessfully for the Democratic nomination for Governor of Alabama (Note: Became a member of the Republican Party in 2012.)
Artur Davis (born 1967)	Alabama's 7th	January 3, 2003	January 3, 2011	Democratic	THRU	Retired to run unsuccessfully for the Democratic nomination for Governor of Alabama
Artur Davis (born 1967)	Alabama's 7th	January 3, 2003	January 3, 2011	Democratic	111th (2009–2011)	Retired to run unsuccessfully for the Democratic nomination for Governor of Alabama
Denise Majette (born 1955)	Georgia's 4th	January 3, 2003	January 3, 2005	Democratic	108th (2003–2005)	Retired from office to run unsuccessfully for the United States Senate
Kendrick Meek (born 1966)	Florida's 17th	January 3, 2003	January 3, 2011	Democratic	108th (2003–2005)	Retired from office to run unsuccessfully for the United States Senate (Note: Succeeded his mother, Carrie P. Meek, in office.)
Kendrick Meek (born 1966)	Florida's 17th	January 3, 2003	January 3, 2011	Democratic	THRU	Retired from office to run unsuccessfully for the United States Senate
Kendrick Meek (born 1966)	Florida's 17th	January 3, 2003	January 3, 2011	Democratic	111th (2009–2011)	Retired from office to run unsuccessfully for the United States Senate
David Scott (1945–2026)	Georgia's 13th	January 3, 2003	April 22, 2026	Democratic	108th (2003–2005)	Died in office
David Scott (1945–2026)	Georgia's 13th	January 3, 2003	April 22, 2026	Democratic	THRU	Died in office
David Scott (1945–2026)	Georgia's 13th	January 3, 2003	April 22, 2026	Democratic	119th (2025–2027)	Died in office
G. K. Butterfield (born 1947)	North Carolina's 1st	July 20, 2004	January 3, 2023	Democratic	108th (2003–2005)	Retired (Note: Elected to fill vacancy caused by the resignation of Frank Ballance. Served as chair of the Congressional Black Caucus in the 114th United States Congress.)
G. K. Butterfield (born 1947)	North Carolina's 1st	July 20, 2004	January 3, 2023	Democratic	THRU	Retired
G. K. Butterfield (born 1947)	North Carolina's 1st	July 20, 2004	January 3, 2023	Democratic	117th (2021–2023)	Retired
Emanuel Cleaver (born 1944)	Missouri's 5th	January 3, 2005	Incumbent	Democratic	109th (2005–2007)	(Note: Served as chair of the Congressional Black Caucus in the 112th United States Congress.)
Emanuel Cleaver (born 1944)	Missouri's 5th	January 3, 2005	Incumbent	Democratic	THRU	(Note: Served as chair of the Congressional Black Caucus in the 112th United States Congress.)
Emanuel Cleaver (born 1944)	Missouri's 5th	January 3, 2005	Incumbent	Democratic	119th (2025–2027)	(Note: Served as chair of the Congressional Black Caucus in the 112th United States Congress.)
Al Green (born 1947)	Texas's 9th	January 3, 2005	January 3, 2027	Democratic	109th (2005–2007)	Lost renomination after redistricting
Al Green (born 1947)	Texas's 9th	January 3, 2005	January 3, 2027	Democratic	THRU	Lost renomination after redistricting
Al Green (born 1947)	Texas's 9th	January 3, 2005	January 3, 2027	Democratic	119th (2025–2027)	Lost renomination after redistricting
Gwen Moore (born 1951)	Wisconsin's 4th	January 3, 2005	Incumbent	Democratic	109th (2005–2007)	(Note: First African American to serve in Congress from Wisconsin.)
Gwen Moore (born 1951)	Wisconsin's 4th	January 3, 2005	Incumbent	Democratic	THRU	(Note: First African American to serve in Congress from Wisconsin.)
Gwen Moore (born 1951)	Wisconsin's 4th	January 3, 2005	Incumbent	Democratic	119th (2025–2027)	(Note: First African American to serve in Congress from Wisconsin.)
Yvette Clarke (born 1964)	New York's 11th	January 3, 2007	January 3, 2013	Democratic	110th (2007–2009)	
Yvette Clarke (born 1964)	New York's 11th	January 3, 2007	January 3, 2013	Democratic	THRU	
Yvette Clarke (born 1964)	New York's 11th	January 3, 2007	January 3, 2013	Democratic	112th (2011–2013)	
Yvette Clarke (born 1964)	New York's 9th	January 3, 2013	Incumbent	Democratic	113th (2013–2015)	
Yvette Clarke (born 1964)	New York's 9th	January 3, 2013	Incumbent	Democratic	THRU	
Yvette Clarke (born 1964)	New York's 9th	January 3, 2013	Incumbent	Democratic	119th (2025–2027)	
Keith Ellison (born 1963)	Minnesota's 5th	January 3, 2007	January 3, 2019	Democratic	110th (2007–2009)	Retired to run successfully for Attorney General of Minnesota (Note: First African American to serve in Congress from Minnesota and the first Muslim to serve in Congress.)
Keith Ellison (born 1963)	Minnesota's 5th	January 3, 2007	January 3, 2019	Democratic	THRU	Retired to run successfully for Attorney General of Minnesota
Keith Ellison (born 1963)	Minnesota's 5th	January 3, 2007	January 3, 2019	Democratic	115th (2017–2019)	Retired to run successfully for Attorney General of Minnesota
Hank Johnson (born 1954)	Georgia's 4th	January 3, 2007	Incumbent	Democratic	110th (2007–2009)	
Hank Johnson (born 1954)	Georgia's 4th	January 3, 2007	Incumbent	Democratic	THRU	
Hank Johnson (born 1954)	Georgia's 4th	January 3, 2007	Incumbent	Democratic	119th (2025–2027)	
Laura Richardson (born 1962)	California's 37th	August 21, 2007	January 3, 2013	Democratic	110th (2007–2009)	Lost reelection (Note: Elected to fill vacancy caused by death of Juanita Millender-McDonald. In 2012 was reprimanded due to use of Congressional office staff in 2010 House election campaign.)
Laura Richardson (born 1962)	California's 37th	August 21, 2007	January 3, 2013	Democratic	111th (2009–2011)	Lost reelection
Laura Richardson (born 1962)	California's 37th	August 21, 2007	January 3, 2013	Democratic	112th (2011–2013)	Lost reelection
André Carson (born 1974)	Indiana's 7th	March 11, 2008	Incumbent	Democratic	110th (2007–2009)	(Note: Elected to fill vacancy caused by the death of his grandmother, Julia Carson.)
André Carson (born 1974)	Indiana's 7th	March 11, 2008	Incumbent	Democratic	THRU	(Note: Elected to fill vacancy caused by the death of his grandmother, Julia Carson.)
André Carson (born 1974)	Indiana's 7th	March 11, 2008	Incumbent	Democratic	119th (2025–2027)	(Note: Elected to fill vacancy caused by the death of his grandmother, Julia Carson.)
Donna Edwards (born 1958)	Maryland's 4th	June 17, 2008	January 3, 2017	Democratic	110th (2007–2009)	Retired to run unsuccessfully for the Democratic nomination for the United States Senate (Note: Elected to fill vacancy caused by resignation of Albert Wynn.)
Donna Edwards (born 1958)	Maryland's 4th	June 17, 2008	January 3, 2017	Democratic	THRU	Retired to run unsuccessfully for the Democratic nomination for the United States Senate
Donna Edwards (born 1958)	Maryland's 4th	June 17, 2008	January 3, 2017	Democratic	114th (2015–2017)	Retired to run unsuccessfully for the Democratic nomination for the United States Senate
Marcia Fudge (born 1952)	Ohio's 11th	November 18, 2008	March 10, 2021	Democratic	110th (2007–2009)	Resigned to become Secretary of Housing and Urban Development. (Note: Elected to fill vacancy caused by death of Stephanie Tubbs Jones. Served as chair of the Congressional Black Caucus in the 113th United States Congress)
Marcia Fudge (born 1952)	Ohio's 11th	November 18, 2008	March 10, 2021	Democratic	THRU	Resigned to become Secretary of Housing and Urban Development.
Marcia Fudge (born 1952)	Ohio's 11th	November 18, 2008	March 10, 2021	Democratic	117th (2021–2023)	Resigned to become Secretary of Housing and Urban Development.
Karen Bass (born 1953)	California's 33rd	January 3, 2011	January 3, 2013	Democratic	112th (2011–2013)	Resigned to become the Mayor of Los Angeles (Note: Served as chair of the Congressional Black Caucus in the 116th United States Congress.)
Karen Bass (born 1953)	California's 37th	January 3, 2013	December 9, 2022	Democratic	113th (2013–2015)	Resigned to become the Mayor of Los Angeles
Karen Bass (born 1953)	California's 37th	January 3, 2013	December 9, 2022	Democratic	THRU	Resigned to become the Mayor of Los Angeles
Karen Bass (born 1953)	California's 37th	January 3, 2013	December 9, 2022	Democratic	117th (2021–2023)	Resigned to become the Mayor of Los Angeles
Hansen Clarke (born 1957)	Michigan's 13th	January 3, 2011	January 3, 2013	Democratic	112th (2011–2013)	Lost renomination
Cedric Richmond (born 1973)	Louisiana's 2nd	January 3, 2011	January 15, 2021	Democratic	112th (2011–2013)	Resigned to become Senior Advisor to the President and Director of the Office of Public Engagement (Note: Served as chair of the Congressional Black Caucus in the 115th United States Congress.)
Cedric Richmond (born 1973)	Louisiana's 2nd	January 3, 2011	January 15, 2021	Democratic	THRU	Resigned to become Senior Advisor to the President and Director of the Office of Public Engagement
Cedric Richmond (born 1973)	Louisiana's 2nd	January 3, 2011	January 15, 2021	Democratic	117th (2021–2023)	Resigned to become Senior Advisor to the President and Director of the Office of Public Engagement
Tim Scott (born 1965)	South Carolina's 1st	January 3, 2011	January 2, 2013	Republican	112th (2011–2013)	After winning reelection, was appointed to the United States Senate and resigned early to take the Senate seat. (Note: Served as Republican assistant majority whip in the 112th United States Congress. First African American to serve in both chambers of the United States Congress)
Terri Sewell (born 1965)	Alabama's 7th	January 3, 2011	Incumbent	Democratic	112th (2011–2013)	(Note: Served as Democratic senior whip in the 112th United States Congress.)
Terri Sewell (born 1965)	Alabama's 7th	January 3, 2011	Incumbent	Democratic	THRU	(Note: Served as Democratic senior whip in the 112th United States Congress.)
Terri Sewell (born 1965)	Alabama's 7th	January 3, 2011	Incumbent	Democratic	119th (2025–2027)	(Note: Served as Democratic senior whip in the 112th United States Congress.)
Allen West (born 1961)	Florida's 22nd	January 3, 2011	January 3, 2013	Republican	112th (2011–2013)	Lost reelection
Frederica Wilson (born 1942)	Florida's 17th	January 3, 2011	January 3, 2013	Democratic	112th (2011–2013)	Retiring
Frederica Wilson (born 1942)	Florida's 24th	January 3, 2013	January 3, 2027	Democratic	113th (2013–2015)	Retiring
Frederica Wilson (born 1942)	Florida's 24th	January 3, 2013	January 3, 2027	Democratic	THRU	Retiring
Frederica Wilson (born 1942)	Florida's 24th	January 3, 2013	January 3, 2027	Democratic	119th (2025–2027)	Retiring
Donald Payne Jr. (1958–2024)	New Jersey's 10th	November 6, 2012	April 24, 2024	Democratic	112th (2011–2013)	Died in office (Note: Elected to fill vacancy caused by the death of his father, Donald M. Payne.)
Donald Payne Jr. (1958–2024)	New Jersey's 10th	November 6, 2012	April 24, 2024	Democratic	THRU	Died in office
Donald Payne Jr. (1958–2024)	New Jersey's 10th	November 6, 2012	April 24, 2024	Democratic	118th (2023–2025)	Died in office
Joyce Beatty (born 1950)	Ohio's 3rd	January 3, 2013	Incumbent	Democratic	113th (2013–2015)	(Note: Served as chair of the Congressional Black Caucus in the 117th United States Congress.)
Joyce Beatty (born 1950)	Ohio's 3rd	January 3, 2013	Incumbent	Democratic	THRU	(Note: Served as chair of the Congressional Black Caucus in the 117th United States Congress.)
Joyce Beatty (born 1950)	Ohio's 3rd	January 3, 2013	Incumbent	Democratic	119th (2025–2027)	(Note: Served as chair of the Congressional Black Caucus in the 117th United States Congress.)
Steven Horsford (born 1973)	Nevada's 4th	January 3, 2013	January 3, 2015	Democratic	113th (2013–2015)	Lost reelection (Note: First African American to serve in Congress from Nevada.)
Steven Horsford (born 1973)	Nevada's 4th	January 3, 2019	Incumbent	Democratic	116th (2019–2021)	
Steven Horsford (born 1973)	Nevada's 4th	January 3, 2019	Incumbent	Democratic	THRU	
Steven Horsford (born 1973)	Nevada's 4th	January 3, 2019	Incumbent	Democratic	119th (2025–2027)	
Hakeem Jeffries (born 1970)	New York's 8th	January 3, 2013	Incumbent	Democratic	113th (2013–2015)	(Note: First African-American to serve as party floor leader for either chamber of Congress)
Hakeem Jeffries (born 1970)	New York's 8th	January 3, 2013	Incumbent	Democratic	THRU	(Note: First African-American to serve as party floor leader for either chamber of Congress)
Hakeem Jeffries (born 1970)	New York's 8th	January 3, 2013	Incumbent	Democratic	119th (2025–2027)	(Note: First African-American to serve as party floor leader for either chamber of Congress)
Marc Veasey (born 1971)	Texas's 33rd	January 3, 2013	January 3, 2027	Democratic	113th (2013–2015)	Retiring
Marc Veasey (born 1971)	Texas's 33rd	January 3, 2013	January 3, 2027	Democratic	THRU	Retiring
Marc Veasey (born 1971)	Texas's 33rd	January 3, 2013	January 3, 2027	Democratic	119th (2025–2027)	Retiring
Robin Kelly (born 1956)	Illinois's 2nd	April 9, 2013	January 3, 2027	Democratic	113th (2013–2015)	Retiring to run unsuccessfully for the Democratic nomination for the United States Senate (Note: Elected to fill vacancy caused by the resignation of Jesse Jackson Jr.)
Robin Kelly (born 1956)	Illinois's 2nd	April 9, 2013	January 3, 2027	Democratic	THRU	Retiring to run unsuccessfully for the Democratic nomination for the United States Senate
Robin Kelly (born 1956)	Illinois's 2nd	April 9, 2013	January 3, 2027	Democratic	119th (2025–2027)	Retiring to run unsuccessfully for the Democratic nomination for the United States Senate
Alma Adams (born 1946)	North Carolina's 12th	November 12, 2014	Incumbent	Democratic	113th (2013–2015)	(Note: Elected to fill vacancy caused by the resignation of Mel Watt.)
Alma Adams (born 1946)	North Carolina's 12th	November 12, 2014	Incumbent	Democratic	THRU	(Note: Elected to fill vacancy caused by the resignation of Mel Watt.)
Alma Adams (born 1946)	North Carolina's 12th	November 12, 2014	Incumbent	Democratic	119th (2025–2027)	(Note: Elected to fill vacancy caused by the resignation of Mel Watt.)
Bonnie Watson Coleman (born 1945)	New Jersey's 12th	January 3, 2015	January 3, 2027	Democratic	114th (2015–2017)	Retiring
Bonnie Watson Coleman (born 1945)	New Jersey's 12th	January 3, 2015	January 3, 2027	Democratic	THRU	Retiring
Bonnie Watson Coleman (born 1945)	New Jersey's 12th	January 3, 2015	January 3, 2027	Democratic	119th (2025–2027)	Retiring
Will Hurd (born 1977)	Texas's 23rd	January 3, 2015	January 3, 2021	Republican	114th (2015–2017)	Retired
Will Hurd (born 1977)	Texas's 23rd	January 3, 2015	January 3, 2021	Republican	115th (2017–2019)	Retired
Will Hurd (born 1977)	Texas's 23rd	January 3, 2015	January 3, 2021	Republican	116th (2019–2021)	Retired
Brenda Lawrence (born 1954)	Michigan's 14th	January 3, 2015	January 3, 2023	Democratic	114th (2015–2017)	Retired
Brenda Lawrence (born 1954)	Michigan's 14th	January 3, 2015	January 3, 2023	Democratic	THRU	Retired
Brenda Lawrence (born 1954)	Michigan's 14th	January 3, 2015	January 3, 2023	Democratic	117th (2021–2023)	Retired
Mia Love (1975–2025)	Utah's 4th	January 3, 2015	January 3, 2019	Republican	114th (2015–2017)	Lost reelection (Note: First female African-American Republican to serve in Congress, first African American to serve in Congress from Utah and first female Haitian American to serve in Congress. Also the first African-American Latter Day Saint elected to Congress after converting in 1998.)
Mia Love (1975–2025)	Utah's 4th	January 3, 2015	January 3, 2019	Republican	115th (2017–2019)	Lost reelection
Dwight Evans (born 1954)	Pennsylvania's 2nd	November 8, 2016	January 3, 2019	Democratic	114th (2015–2017)	Retiring (Note: Elected to fill vacancy caused by the resignation of Chaka Fattah.)
Dwight Evans (born 1954)	Pennsylvania's 2nd	November 8, 2016	January 3, 2019	Democratic	115th (2017–2019)	Retiring
Dwight Evans (born 1954)	Pennsylvania's 3rd	January 3, 2019	January 3, 2027	Democratic	116th (2019–2021)	Retiring
Dwight Evans (born 1954)	Pennsylvania's 3rd	January 3, 2019	January 3, 2027	Democratic	THRU	Retiring
Dwight Evans (born 1954)	Pennsylvania's 3rd	January 3, 2019	January 3, 2027	Democratic	119th (2025–2027)	Retiring
Anthony Brown (born 1961)	Maryland's 4th	January 3, 2017	January 3, 2023	Democratic	115th (2017–2019)	Retired to successfully run for Attorney General of Maryland
Anthony Brown (born 1961)	Maryland's 4th	January 3, 2017	January 3, 2023	Democratic	116th (2019–2021)	Retired to successfully run for Attorney General of Maryland
Anthony Brown (born 1961)	Maryland's 4th	January 3, 2017	January 3, 2023	Democratic	117th (2021–2023)	Retired to successfully run for Attorney General of Maryland
Val Demings (born 1957)	Florida's 10th	January 3, 2017	January 3, 2023	Democratic	115th (2017–2019)	Retired to unsuccessfully run for United States Senate
Val Demings (born 1957)	Florida's 10th	January 3, 2017	January 3, 2023	Democratic	116th (2019–2021)	Retired to unsuccessfully run for United States Senate
Val Demings (born 1957)	Florida's 10th	January 3, 2017	January 3, 2023	Democratic	117th (2021–2023)	Retired to unsuccessfully run for United States Senate
Adriano Espaillat (born 1954)	New York's 13th	January 3, 2017	January 3, 2027	Democratic	115th (2017–2019)	Lost renomination
Adriano Espaillat (born 1954)	New York's 13th	January 3, 2017	January 3, 2027	Democratic	THRU	Lost renomination
Adriano Espaillat (born 1954)	New York's 13th	January 3, 2017	January 3, 2027	Democratic	119th (2025–2027)	Lost renomination
Al Lawson (born 1948)	Florida's 5th	January 3, 2017	January 3, 2023	Democratic	115th (2017–2019)	Lost reelection after redistricting
Al Lawson (born 1948)	Florida's 5th	January 3, 2017	January 3, 2023	Democratic	116th (2019–2021)	Lost reelection after redistricting
Al Lawson (born 1948)	Florida's 5th	January 3, 2017	January 3, 2023	Democratic	117th (2021–2023)	Lost reelection after redistricting
Donald McEachin (1961–2022)	Virginia's 4th	January 3, 2017	November 28, 2022	Democratic	115th (2017–2019)	Died in office
Donald McEachin (1961–2022)	Virginia's 4th	January 3, 2017	November 28, 2022	Democratic	116th (2019–2021)	Died in office
Donald McEachin (1961–2022)	Virginia's 4th	January 3, 2017	November 28, 2022	Democratic	117th (2021–2023)	Died in office
Lisa Blunt Rochester (born 1962)	Delaware's at-large	January 3, 2017	January 3, 2025	Democratic	115th (2017–2019)	Retired to run successfully for the United States Senate (Note: First African American to serve in Congress from Delaware.)
Lisa Blunt Rochester (born 1962)	Delaware's at-large	January 3, 2017	January 3, 2025	Democratic	THRU	Retired to run successfully for the United States Senate
Lisa Blunt Rochester (born 1962)	Delaware's at-large	January 3, 2017	January 3, 2025	Democratic	118th (2023–2025)	Retired to run successfully for the United States Senate
Brenda Jones (born 1959)	Michigan's 13th	November 29, 2018	January 3, 2019	Democratic	115th (2017–2019)	Lost nomination to the next term (Note: Elected to fill vacancy caused by resignation of John Conyers.)
Colin Allred (born 1983)	Texas's 32nd	January 3, 2019	January 3, 2025	Democratic	116th (2019–2021)	Retired to run unsuccessfully for the United States Senate
Colin Allred (born 1983)	Texas's 32nd	January 3, 2019	January 3, 2025	Democratic	117th (2021–2023)	Retired to run unsuccessfully for the United States Senate
Colin Allred (born 1983)	Texas's 32nd	January 3, 2019	January 3, 2025	Democratic	118th (2023–2025)	Retired to run unsuccessfully for the United States Senate
Colin Allred (born 1983)	Texas's 33rd	January 3, 2027		Democratic	Representative-elect	
Antonio Delgado (born 1977)	New York's 19th	January 3, 2019	May 25, 2022	Democratic	116th (2019–2021)	Resigned to become Lieutenant Governor of New York
Antonio Delgado (born 1977)	New York's 19th	January 3, 2019	May 25, 2022	Democratic	117th (2021–2023)	Resigned to become Lieutenant Governor of New York
Jahana Hayes (born 1973)	Connecticut's 5th	January 3, 2019	Incumbent	Democratic	116th (2019–2021)	(Note: First African-American woman to serve in Congress from Connecticut.)
Jahana Hayes (born 1973)	Connecticut's 5th	January 3, 2019	Incumbent	Democratic	THRU	(Note: First African-American woman to serve in Congress from Connecticut.)
Jahana Hayes (born 1973)	Connecticut's 5th	January 3, 2019	Incumbent	Democratic	119th (2025–2027)	(Note: First African-American woman to serve in Congress from Connecticut.)
Lucy McBath (born 1960)	Georgia's 6th	January 3, 2019	January 3, 2023	Democratic	116th (2019–2021)	
Lucy McBath (born 1960)	Georgia's 6th	January 3, 2019	January 3, 2023	Democratic	117th (2021–2023)	
Lucy McBath (born 1960)	Georgia's 7th	January 3, 2023	January 3, 2025	Democratic	118th (2023–2025)	
Lucy McBath (born 1960)	Georgia's 6th	January 3, 2025	Incumbent	Democratic	119th (2025–2027)	
Joe Neguse (born 1984)	Colorado's 2nd	January 3, 2019	Incumbent	Democratic	116th (2019–2021)	(Note: First African American to serve in Congress from Colorado and first Eritrean American to serve in Congress.)
Joe Neguse (born 1984)	Colorado's 2nd	January 3, 2019	Incumbent	Democratic	THRU	(Note: First African American to serve in Congress from Colorado and first Eritrean American to serve in Congress.)
Joe Neguse (born 1984)	Colorado's 2nd	January 3, 2019	Incumbent	Democratic	119th (2025–2027)	(Note: First African American to serve in Congress from Colorado and first Eritrean American to serve in Congress.)
Ilhan Omar (born 1981)	Minnesota's 5th	January 3, 2019	Incumbent	Democratic	116th (2019–2021)	(Note: First Somali-American to serve in Congress. Along with Rashida Tlaib, the first Muslim-American woman to serve in Congress.)
Ilhan Omar (born 1981)	Minnesota's 5th	January 3, 2019	Incumbent	Democratic	THRU	(Note: First Somali-American to serve in Congress. Along with Rashida Tlaib, the first Muslim-American woman to serve in Congress.)
Ilhan Omar (born 1981)	Minnesota's 5th	January 3, 2019	Incumbent	Democratic	119th (2025–2027)	(Note: First Somali-American to serve in Congress. Along with Rashida Tlaib, the first Muslim-American woman to serve in Congress.)
Ayanna Pressley (born 1974)	Massachusetts's 7th	January 3, 2019	Incumbent	Democratic	116th (2019–2021)	(Note: First African-American woman to serve in Congress from Massachusetts.)
Ayanna Pressley (born 1974)	Massachusetts's 7th	January 3, 2019	Incumbent	Democratic	THRU	(Note: First African-American woman to serve in Congress from Massachusetts.)
Ayanna Pressley (born 1974)	Massachusetts's 7th	January 3, 2019	Incumbent	Democratic	119th (2025–2027)	(Note: First African-American woman to serve in Congress from Massachusetts.)
Lauren Underwood (born 1986)	Illinois's 14th	January 3, 2019	Incumbent	Democratic	116th (2019–2021)	
Lauren Underwood (born 1986)	Illinois's 14th	January 3, 2019	Incumbent	Democratic	THRU	
Lauren Underwood (born 1986)	Illinois's 14th	January 3, 2019	Incumbent	Democratic	119th (2025–2027)	
Kwanza Hall (born 1971)	Georgia's 5th	December 3, 2020	January 3, 2021	Democratic	116th (2019–2021)	Retired (Note: Elected to fill vacancy caused by the death of John Lewis, for a term that ended at the conclusion of the 116th United States Congress on January 3, 2021.)
Jamaal Bowman (born 1976)	New York's 16th	January 3, 2021	January 3, 2025	Democratic	117th (2021–2023)	Lost renomination
Jamaal Bowman (born 1976)	New York's 16th	January 3, 2021	January 3, 2025	Democratic	118th (2023–2025)	Lost renomination
Cori Bush (born 1976)	Missouri's 1st	January 3, 2021	January 3, 2025	Democratic	117th (2021–2023)	Lost renomination (Note: First African-American woman to serve in Congress from Missouri.)
Cori Bush (born 1976)	Missouri's 1st	January 3, 2021	January 3, 2025	Democratic	118th (2023–2025)	Lost renomination
Byron Donalds (born 1978)	Florida's 19th	January 3, 2021	January 3, 2027	Republican	117th (2021–2023)	Retiring to run successfully for Governor of Florida
Byron Donalds (born 1978)	Florida's 19th	January 3, 2021	January 3, 2027	Republican	118th (2023–2025)	Retiring to run successfully for Governor of Florida
Byron Donalds (born 1978)	Florida's 19th	January 3, 2021	January 3, 2027	Republican	119th (2025–2027)	Retiring to run successfully for Governor of Florida
Mondaire Jones (born 1987)	New York's 17th	January 3, 2021	January 3, 2023	Democratic	117th (2021–2023)	Lost renomination after redistricting
Burgess Owens (born 1951)	Utah's 4th	January 3, 2021	January 3, 2027	Republican	117th (2021–2023)	Retiring after redistricting
Burgess Owens (born 1951)	Utah's 4th	January 3, 2021	January 3, 2027	Republican	118th (2023–2025)	Retiring after redistricting
Burgess Owens (born 1951)	Utah's 4th	January 3, 2021	January 3, 2027	Republican	119th (2025–2027)	Retiring after redistricting
Marilyn Strickland (born 1962)	Washington's 10th	January 3, 2021	Incumbent	Democratic	117th (2021–2023)	(Note: First African American to serve in Congress from Washington. Also first Afro-Asian woman elected to the U.S. House of Representatives.)
Marilyn Strickland (born 1962)	Washington's 10th	January 3, 2021	Incumbent	Democratic	118th (2023–2025)	(Note: First African American to serve in Congress from Washington. Also first Afro-Asian woman elected to the U.S. House of Representatives.)
Marilyn Strickland (born 1962)	Washington's 10th	January 3, 2021	Incumbent	Democratic	119th (2025–2027)	(Note: First African American to serve in Congress from Washington. Also first Afro-Asian woman elected to the U.S. House of Representatives.)
Ritchie Torres (born 1988)	New York's 15th	January 3, 2021	Incumbent	Democratic	117th (2021–2023)	(Note: First LGBTQ African American to serve in Congress.)
Ritchie Torres (born 1988)	New York's 15th	January 3, 2021	Incumbent	Democratic	118th (2023–2025)	(Note: First LGBTQ African American to serve in Congress.)
Ritchie Torres (born 1988)	New York's 15th	January 3, 2021	Incumbent	Democratic	119th (2025–2027)	(Note: First LGBTQ African American to serve in Congress.)
Nikema Williams (born 1978)	Georgia's 5th	January 3, 2021	Incumbent	Democratic	117th (2021–2023)	
Nikema Williams (born 1978)	Georgia's 5th	January 3, 2021	Incumbent	Democratic	118th (2023–2025)	
Nikema Williams (born 1978)	Georgia's 5th	January 3, 2021	Incumbent	Democratic	119th (2025–2027)	
Troy Carter (born 1963)	Louisiana's 2nd	May 11, 2021	Incumbent	Democratic	117th (2021–2023)	(Note: Elected to fill vacancy caused by resignation of Cedric Richmond.)
Troy Carter (born 1963)	Louisiana's 2nd	May 11, 2021	Incumbent	Democratic	118th (2023–2025)	(Note: Elected to fill vacancy caused by resignation of Cedric Richmond.)
Troy Carter (born 1963)	Louisiana's 2nd	May 11, 2021	Incumbent	Democratic	119th (2025–2027)	(Note: Elected to fill vacancy caused by resignation of Cedric Richmond.)
Shontel Brown (born 1975)	Ohio's 11th	November 4, 2021	Incumbent	Democratic	117th (2021–2023)	(Note: Elected to fill vacancy caused by resignation of Marcia Fudge.)
Shontel Brown (born 1975)	Ohio's 11th	November 4, 2021	Incumbent	Democratic	118th (2023–2025)	(Note: Elected to fill vacancy caused by resignation of Marcia Fudge.)
Shontel Brown (born 1975)	Ohio's 11th	November 4, 2021	Incumbent	Democratic	119th (2025–2027)	(Note: Elected to fill vacancy caused by resignation of Marcia Fudge.)
Sheila Cherfilus-McCormick (born 1979)	Florida's 20th	January 18, 2022	April 21, 2026	Democratic	117th (2021–2023)	Resigned (Note: Elected to fill vacancy caused by death of Alcee Hastings.)
Sheila Cherfilus-McCormick (born 1979)	Florida's 20th	January 18, 2022	April 21, 2026	Democratic	118th (2023–2025)	Resigned
Sheila Cherfilus-McCormick (born 1979)	Florida's 20th	January 18, 2022	April 21, 2026	Democratic	119th (2025–2027)	Resigned
Jasmine Crockett (born 1981)	Texas's 30th	January 3, 2023	January 3, 2027	Democratic	118th (2023–2025)	Retiring to run unsuccessfully for the Democratic nomination for the United States Senate
Jasmine Crockett (born 1981)	Texas's 30th	January 3, 2023	January 3, 2027	Democratic	119th (2025–2027)	Retiring to run unsuccessfully for the Democratic nomination for the United States Senate
Don Davis (born 1971)	North Carolina's 1st	January 3, 2023	Incumbent	Democratic	118th (2023–2025)	
Don Davis (born 1971)	North Carolina's 1st	January 3, 2023	Incumbent	Democratic	119th (2025–2027)	
Valerie Foushee (born 1956)	North Carolina's 4th	January 3, 2023	Incumbent	Democratic	118th (2023–2025)	
Valerie Foushee (born 1956)	North Carolina's 4th	January 3, 2023	Incumbent	Democratic	119th (2025–2027)	
Maxwell Frost (born 1997)	Florida's 10th	January 3, 2023	Incumbent	Democratic	118th (2023–2025)	(Note: Youngest member of the 118th United States Congress at age 25.)
Maxwell Frost (born 1997)	Florida's 10th	January 3, 2023	Incumbent	Democratic	119th (2025–2027)	(Note: Youngest member of the 118th United States Congress at age 25.)
Wesley Hunt (born 1981)	Texas's 38th	January 3, 2023	January 3, 2027	Republican	118th (2023–2025)	Retiring to run unsuccessfully for the Republican nomination for the United States Senate
Wesley Hunt (born 1981)	Texas's 38th	January 3, 2023	January 3, 2027	Republican	119th (2025–2027)	Retiring to run unsuccessfully for the Republican nomination for the United States Senate
Glenn Ivey (born 1961)	Maryland's 4th	January 3, 2023	Incumbent	Democratic	118th (2023–2025)	
Glenn Ivey (born 1961)	Maryland's 4th	January 3, 2023	Incumbent	Democratic	119th (2025–2027)	
Jonathan Jackson (born 1966)	Illinois's 1st	January 3, 2023	Incumbent	Democratic	118th (2023–2025)	
Jonathan Jackson (born 1966)	Illinois's 1st	January 3, 2023	Incumbent	Democratic	119th (2025–2027)	
John James (born 1981)	Michigan's 10th	January 3, 2023	January 3, 2027	Republican	118th (2023–2025)	Retiring to run unsuccessfully for Governor of Michigan
John James (born 1981)	Michigan's 10th	January 3, 2023	January 3, 2027	Republican	119th (2025–2027)	Retiring to run unsuccessfully for Governor of Michigan
Sydney Kamlager-Dove (born 1972)	California's 37th	January 3, 2023	Incumbent	Democratic	118th (2023–2025)	
Sydney Kamlager-Dove (born 1972)	California's 37th	January 3, 2023	Incumbent	Democratic	119th (2025–2027)	
Summer Lee (born 1987)	Pennsylvania's 12th	January 3, 2023	Incumbent	Democratic	118th (2023–2025)	(Note: First African-American woman to serve in Congress from Pennsylvania.)
Summer Lee (born 1987)	Pennsylvania's 12th	January 3, 2023	Incumbent	Democratic	119th (2025–2027)	(Note: First African-American woman to serve in Congress from Pennsylvania.)
Emilia Sykes (born 1986)	Ohio's 13th	January 3, 2023	Incumbent	Democratic	118th (2023–2025)	
Emilia Sykes (born 1986)	Ohio's 13th	January 3, 2023	Incumbent	Democratic	119th (2025–2027)	
Jennifer McClellan (born 1972)	Virginia's 4th	March 7, 2023	Incumbent	Democratic	118th (2023–2025)	(Note: Elected to fill vacancy caused by the death of re-elected Donald McEachin, for a term that already began at the opening of the 118th United States Congress on January 3, 2023. First African-American woman to serve in Congress from Virginia.)
Jennifer McClellan (born 1972)	Virginia's 4th	March 7, 2023	Incumbent	Democratic	119th (2025–2027)	(Note: Elected to fill vacancy caused by the death of re-elected Donald McEachin, for a term that already began at the opening of the 118th United States Congress on January 3, 2023. First African-American woman to serve in Congress from Virginia.)
Gabe Amo (born 1987)	Rhode Island's 1st	November 13, 2023	Incumbent	Democratic	118th (2023–2025)	(Note: Elected to fill vacancy caused by the resignation of David Cicilline. First African American to serve in Congress from Rhode Island.)
Gabe Amo (born 1987)	Rhode Island's 1st	November 13, 2023	Incumbent	Democratic	119th (2025–2027)	(Note: Elected to fill vacancy caused by the resignation of David Cicilline. First African American to serve in Congress from Rhode Island.)
LaMonica McIver (born 1986)	New Jersey's 10th	September 23, 2024	Incumbent	Democratic	118th (2023–2025)	(Note: Elected to fill vacancy caused by the death of Donald Payne Jr.)
LaMonica McIver (born 1986)	New Jersey's 10th	September 23, 2024	Incumbent	Democratic	119th (2025–2027)	(Note: Elected to fill vacancy caused by the death of Donald Payne Jr.)
Erica Lee Carter (born 1980)	Texas's 18th	November 12, 2024	January 3, 2025	Democratic	118th (2023–2025)	Retired (Note: Elected to fill vacancy caused by the death of her mother, Sheila Jackson Lee.)
Wesley Bell (born 1974)	Missouri's 1st	January 3, 2025	Incumbent	Democratic	119th (2025–2027)	
Janelle Bynum (born 1975)	Oregon's 5th	January 3, 2025	Incumbent	Democratic	119th (2025–2027)	(Note: First African American to serve in Congress from Oregon.)
Herb Conaway (born 1963)	New Jersey's 3rd	January 3, 2025	Incumbent	Democratic	119th (2025–2027)	
Shomari Figures (born 1986)	Alabama's 2nd	January 3, 2025	Incumbent	Democratic	119th (2025–2027)	
Lateefah Simon (born 1977)	California's 12th	January 3, 2025	Incumbent	Democratic	119th (2025–2027)	
Sylvester Turner (1954–2025)	Texas's 18th	January 3, 2025	March 5, 2025	Democratic	119th (2025–2027)	Died in office
Christian Menefee (born 1988)	Texas's 18th	February 2, 2026	Incumbent	Democratic	119th (2025–2027)	(Note: Elected to Congress to fill vacancy caused by the death of Sylvester Turner.)
Analilia Mejia (born 1972)	New Jersey's 11th	April 20, 2026	Incumbent	Democratic	119th (2025–2027)	(Note: Elected to Congress to fill vacancy caused by the resignation of Mikie Sherrill to become Governor of New Jersey. First Afro-Latina to serve in Congress.)
Everton Blair (born 1992)	Georgia's 13th	September 1, 2026	January 3, 2027	Democratic	119th (2025–2027)	Lost nomination to the next term (Note: Elected to Congress to fill vacancy caused by the death of David Scott.)

==== Representatives-elect ====
Name	District	Start	Party	Ref.	Note
Darializa Avila Chevalier (born 1993–94)	New York's 13th	January 3, 2027	Democratic		
Adrian Boafo (born 1994)	Maryland's 5th	January 3, 2027	Democratic		
Jasmine Clark (born 1982)	Georgia's 13th	January 3, 2027	Democratic		
La Shawn Ford (born 1972)	Illinois's 7th	January 3, 2027	Democratic		
Oliver Gilbert (born 1972)	Florida's 24th	January 3, 2027	Democratic		
Frederick Haynes III (born 1960)	Texas's 30th	January 3, 2027	Democratic		
Cyril Jefferson (born 1992)	North Carolina's 6th	January 3, 2027	Democratic		
Melat Kiros (born 1997)	Colorado's 1st	January 3, 2027	Democratic		
Donovan McKinney (born 1992)	Michigan's 13th	January 3, 2027	Democratic		
Donna Miller (born 1965)	Illinois's 2nd	January 3, 2027	Democratic		
Chris Rabb (born 1970)	Pennsylvania's 3rd	January 3, 2027	Democratic		
Raymond Smith Jr. (born 1961)	North Carolina's 3rd	January 3, 2027	Democratic		
LaKesha Womack (born 1977)	North Carolina's 14th	January 3, 2027	Democratic		

=== House delegates (non-voting members) ===
Political parties

Democratic Republican Independent

Name	District	Start	End	Party	Congress	Notes
Walter Fauntroy (born 1933)	District of Columbia's at-large	March 23, 1971	January 3, 1991	Democratic	92nd (1971–1973)	Retired to run unsuccessfully for Mayor of the District of Columbia (Note: First African American to serve as a delegate for the District of Columbia. Elected to serve in Congress after the District of Columbia was authorized to elect a Delegate by the District of Columbia Delegate Act of 1970. Served as chair of the Congressional Black Caucus in the 97th United States Congress.)
Walter Fauntroy (born 1933)	District of Columbia's at-large	March 23, 1971	January 3, 1991	Democratic	THRU	Retired to run unsuccessfully for Mayor of the District of Columbia
Walter Fauntroy (born 1933)	District of Columbia's at-large	March 23, 1971	January 3, 1991	Democratic	101st (1989–1991)	Retired to run unsuccessfully for Mayor of the District of Columbia
Melvin H. Evans (1917–1984)	Virgin Islands' at-large	January 3, 1979	January 3, 1981	Republican	96th (1979–1981)	Lost reelection (Note: First African American to serve in Congress from the Virgin Islands.)
Eleanor Holmes Norton (born 1937)	District of Columbia's at-large	January 3, 1991	January 3, 2027	Democratic	102nd (1991–1993)	Retiring
Eleanor Holmes Norton (born 1937)	District of Columbia's at-large	January 3, 1991	January 3, 2027	Democratic	THRU	Retiring
Eleanor Holmes Norton (born 1937)	District of Columbia's at-large	January 3, 1991	January 3, 2027	Democratic	119th (2025–2027)	Retiring
Victor O. Frazer (born 1943)	Virgin Islands' at-large	January 3, 1995	January 3, 1997	Independent	104th (1995–1997)	Lost reelection
Donna Christian-Christensen (born 1945)	Virgin Islands' at-large	January 3, 1997	January 3, 2015	Democratic	105th (1997–1999)	Retired to run unsuccessfully for Governor of Virgin Islands (Note: First woman elected to serve in Congress from the Virgin Islands.)
Donna Christian-Christensen (born 1945)	Virgin Islands' at-large	January 3, 1997	January 3, 2015	Democratic	THRU	Retired to run unsuccessfully for Governor of Virgin Islands
Donna Christian-Christensen (born 1945)	Virgin Islands' at-large	January 3, 1997	January 3, 2015	Democratic	113th (2013–2015)	Retired to run unsuccessfully for Governor of Virgin Islands
Stacey Plaskett (born 1966)	Virgin Islands' at-large	January 3, 2015	January 3, 2027	Democratic	114th (2015–2017)	Retiring to run successfully for Governor of Virgin Islands
Stacey Plaskett (born 1966)	Virgin Islands' at-large	January 3, 2015	January 3, 2027	Democratic	THRU	Retiring to run successfully for Governor of Virgin Islands
Stacey Plaskett (born 1966)	Virgin Islands' at-large	January 3, 2015	January 3, 2027	Democratic	119th (2025–2027)	Retiring to run successfully for Governor of Virgin Islands

==== Delegates-elect ====
Name	District	Start	Party	Ref.	Note
Robert White (born 1982)	District of Columbia's at-large	January 3, 2027	Democratic		
Janelle Sarauw (born 1985)	Virgin Islands' at-large	January 3, 2027	Democratic		

=== African Americans elected to the House of Representatives, but not seated ===
Political party

Republican

Name	District	Year elected	Party	Congress	Former slave?	Notes
John Willis Menard (1838–1893)	Louisiana's 2nd	1868	Republican	41st (1869–1871)	No	Denied seat due to a contested election that involved white Democrat Caleb S. Hunt, but was permitted to address the House while in session, the first African American to do so. (Note: Elected to fill vacancy caused by death of James Mann. First African American elected to Congress, but denied seat.)
Samuel Peters (1835–1873)	Louisiana's 4th	1872	Republican	43rd (1873–1875)	No	Died on September 26, 1873, before the U.S. House of Representatives for the 43rd Congress was assembled.
P. B. S. Pinchback (1837–1921)	Louisiana's at-large	1872	Republican	43rd (1873–1875)	No	Denied seat due to a contested election that involved white Liberal Republican George A. Sheridan.

== See also ==
=== Federal government ===
- African Americans in the United States Congress
  - List of African-American United States senators
  - Congressional Black Caucus
  - Congressional Black Caucus Foundation
- List of African-American United States Cabinet members

=== State and local government ===
- African-American officeholders in the United States, 1789–1866
- List of African-American U.S. state firsts
- List of first African-American mayors
