= Benjamin F. Lewis =

American politician and murder victim

Alderman of the Chicago City Council
- In office April 8, 1958 – February 28, 1963
- Preceded by: Vacant, previously Sidney D. Deutsch
- Succeeded by: Vacant, then George W. Collins
- Constituency: 24th ward

Personal details
- Born: December 2, 1909 Macon, Georgia, U.S.
- Died: February 28, 1963 (aged 53) Chicago, Illinois, U.S.
- Party: Democratic

Military service
- Allegiance: United States
- Branch/service: United States Army
- Rank: Second Lieutenant
- Battles/wars: World War II

Benjamin Franklin Lewis (December 2, 1909 – February 28, 1963) was an American politician who served as alderman of Chicago's 24th ward from 1958 until he was murdered in his ward office in 1963. The case remains unsolved.

Lewis was a native of Georgia, but a long-time resident of Chicago, and he was the first black political leader of a ward that had been dominated by Jews. He was known for his brash fashion and quick-witted personality, and he lived a luxurious life and was a presumptive future leader of Chicago's black community. There are many possible suspects for his murder, since Chicago's political landscape was notoriously corrupt at the time.

Lewis was fondly remembered in his ward decades after his death for his service to the community, and the City Council designated a section of Pulaski Road as "Benjamin F. Lewis Road" in his honor in 1993.

== Early life ==
Benjamin Franklin Lewis was born in Macon, Georgia, on December 2, 1909, and moved to Chicago's west side with his family as a child, attending Crane High School and Crane Junior College. He worked for the United States Unemployment Service as a clerk from 1938 to 1941 and served as a second lieutenant in World War II, moving to the 24th ward after the war. He served as a bus driver for the Chicago Transit Authority prior to quitting that job in 1955. He became a precinct captain in 1952, the first African-American one in the 24th ward.

== Tenure as alderman ==
Chicago's 24th ward encompassed the North Lawndale community area, known locally as "Lawndale", which was a Russian Jewish stronghold into the 1950s, after which it became predominantly black. Despite the Jewish flight in the 1950s, whites continued to control the ward and fought to retain that control; this was common on Chicago's west side, where such wards were known as "plantation wards", in contrast to the south side which had black political representation dating back decades.

Lewis was working as a city housing inspector when he was elected as the 24th ward alderman to replace Sidney D. Deutsch, who had been appointed City Treasurer and vacated the office on September 24, 1957. Lewis defeated attorney Arthur N. Hamilton, who subsequently petitioned the county court to void the election and either declare Hamilton the alderman or to hold a new election, alleging such irregularities as election judge misconduct and voter bribery. Judge Carl H. Smith dismissed the suit on June 6, holding the complaint to be insufficient, and Lewis took office on April 8, 1958. During his tenure, he courted controversy when he referred clients to his own insurance business despite receiving $50 a month and five percent on commissions of business for referring clients to insurance agent Arthur X. Elrod, Inc. He reached a settlement with Elrod, Inc. in July 1962 in which he promised not to refer clients of Elrod, Inc. to his own business while the contract was still valid. Arthur X. Elrod had been the ward's committeeman prior to 1960.

Lewis was the first black alderman of the 24th ward. He often made disparaging remarks towards South Side black leaders such as William L. Dawson. He expressed indifference when asked how he stood on an unsuccessful attempt by Dawson and others to replace 5th ward alderman Leon Despres with a black man: "I stand right at Kedzie and Roosevelt in my ward." He was flashy and liked to be called "Big Cat", and was also known as the "Duke of Dixieland". He had several mistresses, took vacations in Acapulco, held much real estate, and was known for his flashy wardrobe consisting almost entirely of suits costing at least $200—despite having an annual salary of $8,000. He was also noted for his quick wit, although he was soft-spoken during council business and rarely made a speech. Actual power in the ward was held by Irwin Horowitz during his tenure. Horowitz was a real estate manager living in the Gold Coast.

President Franklin D. Roosevelt had called the 24th ward "the best Democratic ward in the country," and it continued that reputation in Lewis's time. Lewis was an ardent adherent to the Democratic machine and was selected by Richard J. Daley to become 24th ward committeeman upon Deutsch's death in October 1961. At the start of his tenure, 37 of the ward's 58 precincts had white precinct captains, but Lewis gradually replaced the white captains with blacks; when the white captains complained, Lewis suggested that they go to their respective ward committeemen for patronage positions. At the time of his murder, he had expressed his intention to replace the ailing Thomas J. O'Brien as the congressman representing Illinois's 6th congressional district, and he was widely expected to replace Dawson as the main black political leader in Chicago.

=== Murder ===
In the early hours of February 28, 1963, Lewis was murdered in his ward office on Roosevelt Road, where he had moved the day before. He had heavily won reelection to the City Council two days previously, defeating his opponent Jeff Clifford Alford 13,189 votes to 888. He was found handcuffed to his desk with cigarette burns on his skin and had been shot three times in the back of the head.

The case remains unsolved, but the murder was widely attributed to organized crime at the time. An FBI informant blamed Outfit killers Lenny Patrick and Dave Yaras for the killing, but no charges were ever filed against them. Jimmy Hoffa historian Dan Moldea claimed that the hitman was a friend of Jack Ruby. It was popularly believed at the time that the murder was unsolvable as there were too many suspects given Lewis's activities, a sentiment that was shared by the director of the investigation. An ex-convict boasted about killing Lewis in 1985, but died in a fire before police could question him. The last activity in the investigation was in 2000.

After Lewis's death the office of 24th ward alderman remained vacant until future Congressman George W. Collins assumed it on January 21, 1964.

== Legacy ==
Lewis is the last politician murdered in Chicago as of 2019. According to historian Richard Lindberg, the murder "capped off an open lawlessness in the city with regards to its politicians that [had] been going on ... since the time of Al Capone".

Lewis is also remembered for his contributions to the community. 24th ward alderman Jesse Miller, speaking in 1993, noted that "even today, Ben Lewis is considered to have been a stalwart in the community who was a pioneer in making the 24th Ward an independent ward in the city," and successfully petitioned the City Council to designate Pulaski Road between Harrison Street and Cermak Road as "Benjamin F. Lewis Road".

== See also ==
- List of Chicago aldermen since 1923
- List of unsolved murders (1900–1979)

== Bibliography ==
- Fremon, David K. (1988). Chicago Politics Ward by Ward. Bloomington, Indiana and Indianapolis, Indiana: Indiana University Press. ISBN 0-253-31344-9.
- Waldron, Lamar; Hartmann, Thom (2008). Legacy of Secrecy: The Long Shadow of the JFK Assassination. Berkeley, California: Counterpoint. ISBN 978-1-58243-422-3.
