= Cardiss Collins =

American politician (1931–2013)

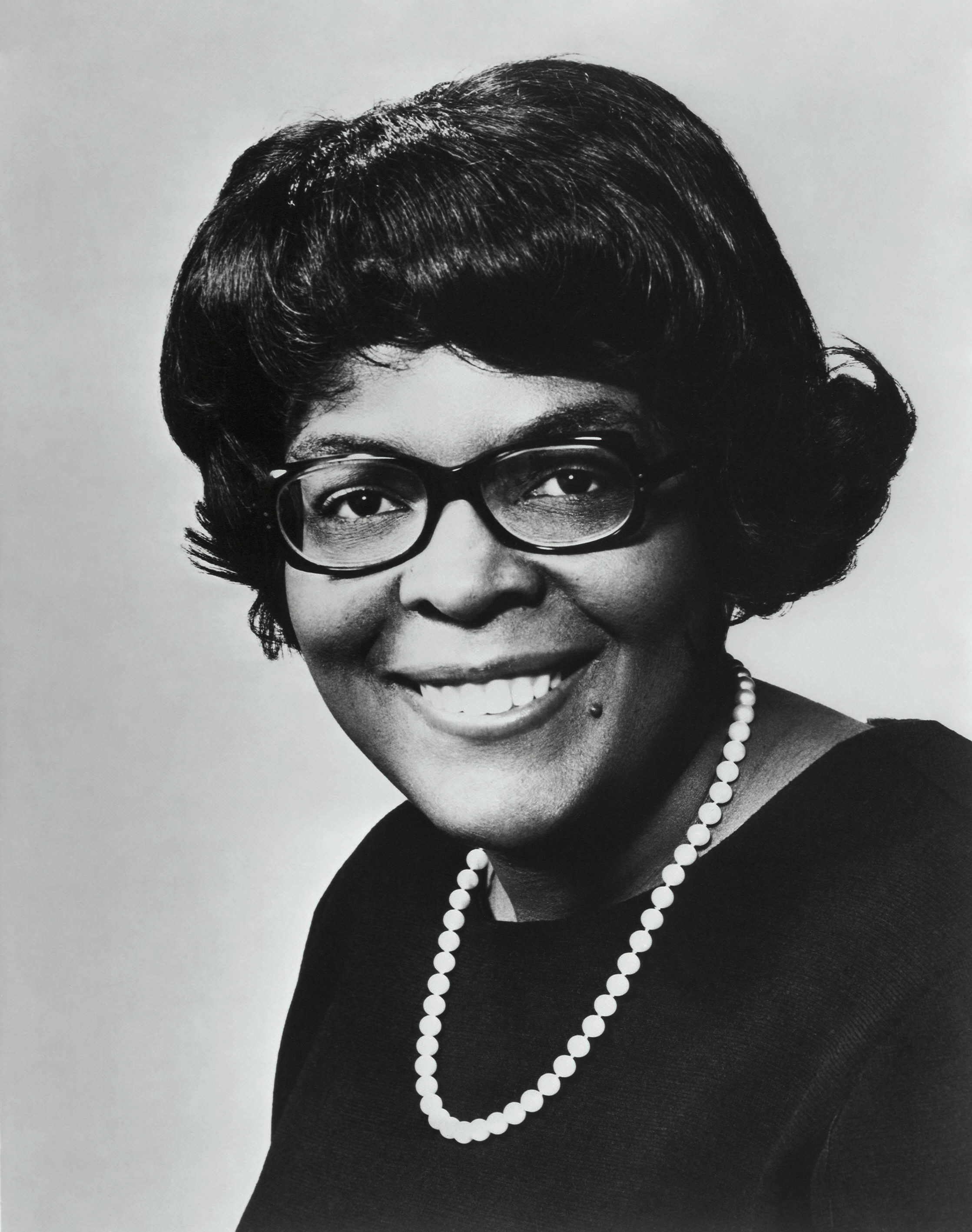

Member of the U.S. House of Representatives from Illinois's 7th district
- In office June 5, 1973 – January 3, 1997
- Preceded by: Frank Annunzio
- Succeeded by: Danny Davis

Personal details
- Born: Cardiss Hortense Robertson; September 24, 1931 St. Louis, Missouri, U.S.
- Died: February 3, 2013 (aged 81) Alexandria, Virginia, U.S.
- Resting place: Arlington National Cemetery
- Party: Democratic
- Spouse: George Collins (m. 1958; died 1972)
- Education: Northwestern University (attended)

Cardiss Hortense Collins (née Robertson; September 24, 1931 – February 3, 2013) was an American politician from Illinois who served in the United States House of Representatives from 1973 to 1997. A member of the Democratic Party, she was the fourth African-American woman in Congress and the first to represent the Midwest. Collins was elected to Congress in the June 5, 1973 special election to replace her husband, George, who had died in the December 8, 1972 United Airlines Flight 553 plane crash a month after being elected to a second term. The seat had been renumbered and combined from the 6th district to the 7th, and had been redrawn to include the Loop. She had previously worked as an accountant in various state government positions.

== Congressional career ==
Throughout her political career, she was a champion for women's health and welfare issues. In 1975, she was instrumental in prompting the Social Security Administration to revise Medicare regulations to cover the cost of post-mastectomy breast prosthesis, which before then had been considered cosmetic. In 1979, she was elected as chairwoman of the Congressional Black Caucus, a position she used to become an occasional critic of President Jimmy Carter. She later became the caucus vice chairman. In the 1980s, Collins warded off two primary challenges from Alderman Danny K. Davis, who would finally be elected to replace her after she chose not to seek reelection in 1996. In 1990, Collins, along with 15 other African-American women and men, formed the African-American Women for Reproductive Freedom.

In 1991, Collins was named chair of the Energy and Commerce Subcommittee on Commerce, Consumer Protection, and Competitiveness. Her legislative interests were focused on establishing universal health insurance, providing for gender equity in college sports, and reforming federal child care facilities. Collins gained a brief national prominence in 1993 as the chairwoman of a congressional committee investigating college sports and as a critic of the NCAA. She also engaged in an intense debate with Rep. Henry Hyde over Medicaid funding of abortion that year.

During her last term (1995–1997), she served as ranking member of the Government Reform and Oversight Committee.

== Retirement, death and honors ==
Collins did not seek re-election in 1996, citing her age. At the time of her retirement, she was the longest-serving Black female member of Congress. In 2004, she was selected by Nielsen Media Research to head a task force examining the representation of African Americans in TV rating samples. Collins lived in Alexandria, Virginia at the time of her death on February 3, 2013, at the age of 81. The United States Postal Service's Cardiss Collins Processing and Distribution Center, located at 433 W. Harrison St. in Chicago, Illinois, is named in her honor and was completed in 1996 to replace the old Main Post Office across the street on Van Buren Street.

== See also ==
- List of African-American United States representatives
- Women in the United States House of Representatives

U.S. House of Representatives
Preceded by George Collins	Member of the U.S. House of Representatives from Illinois's 7th congressional district 1973–1997	Succeeded by Danny Davis
Preceded by Parren Mitchell	Chair of the Congressional Black Caucus; 1979–1981	Succeeded by Walter Fauntroy
Preceded by William Clinger	Ranking Member of the House Oversight Committee; 1995–1997	Succeeded by Henry Waxman
