= George W. Collins =

American politician (1925–1972)

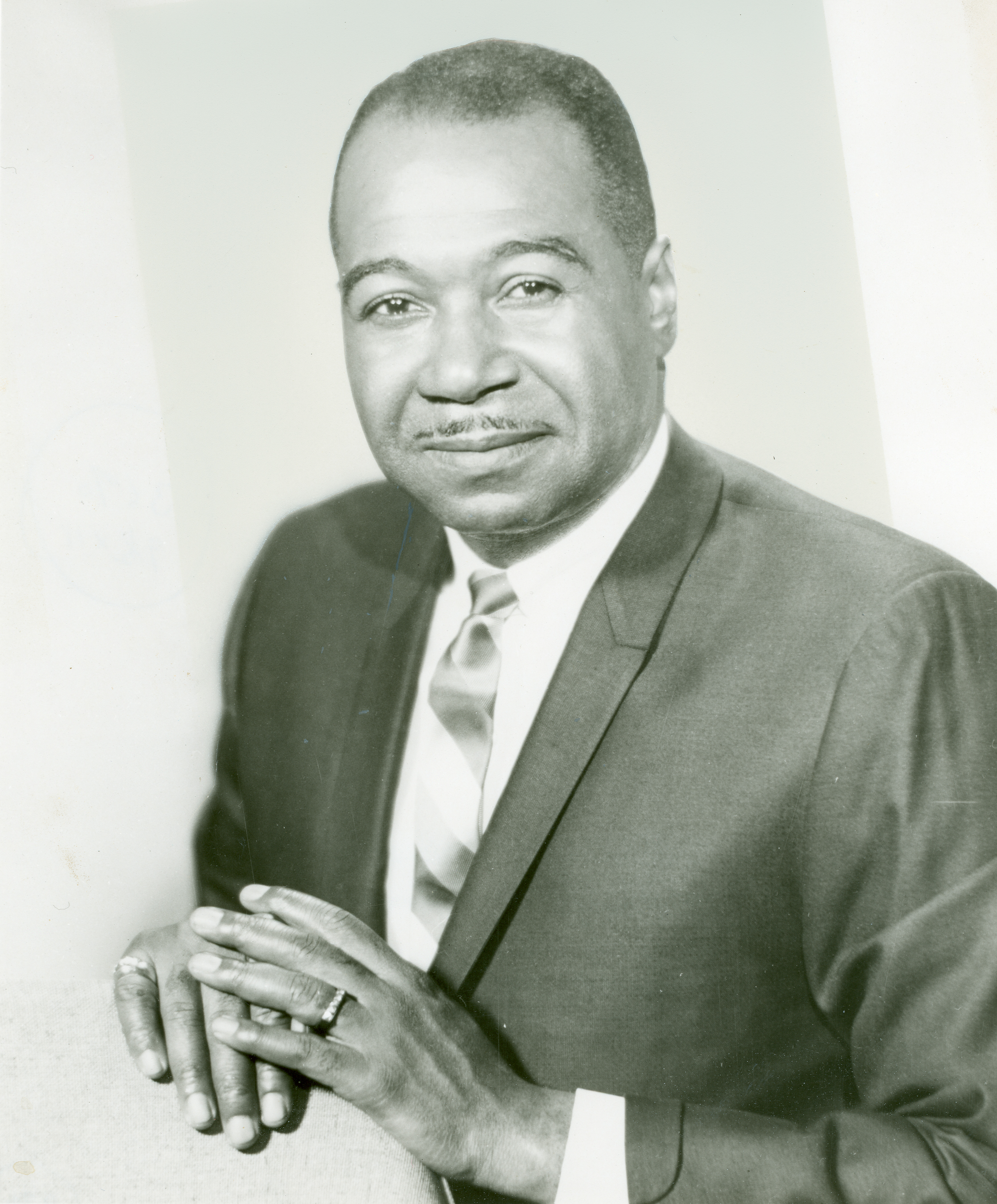

Member of the U.S. House of Representatives from Illinois's 6th district
- In office November 3, 1970 – December 8, 1972
- Preceded by: Daniel J. Ronan
- Succeeded by: Harold R. Collier (6th district) Cardiss Collins (7th district)

Personal details
- Born: George Washington Collins; March 5, 1925 Chicago, Illinois, U.S.
- Died: December 8, 1972 (aged 47) Chicago, Illinois, U.S.
- Resting place: Arlington National Cemetery Arlington, Virginia
- Party: Democratic
- Spouse: Cardiss Collins (m. 1958)
- Education: Waller High School; Northwestern University

Military service
- Allegiance: United States
- Branch/service: United States Army
- Rank: Private First Class
- Battles/wars: World War II

George Washington Collins (March 5, 1925 – December 8, 1972) was an American politician. Collins was a Democratic member of the U.S. House of Representatives from Illinois. Collins served from November 1970 until he was killed in a plane crash on December 8, 1972, in Chicago, Illinois at age 47.

== Biography ==
=== Early life and career ===
Collins was born in Chicago, grew up on the near-north side, and attended Waller High School (now known as Lincoln Park High School). After high school, Collins served with the Army engineers in the South Pacific during World War II. After the war, Collins held positions with the Cook County sheriff's department, the Municipal Court system, and the Board of Health, and as administrative assistant to health commissioner prior to being sent to Congress. Collins studied business law at Northwestern University before entering into politics. From 1964 to 1970, Collins served as a member of the Chicago city council, becoming an alderman in the 24th ward to replace the murdered Benjamin F. Lewis. Collins was then elected to fill the vacancy caused by the death of U.S. Rep. Daniel J. Ronan and reelected to the succeeding Congress and served until his death.

=== Death and legacy ===
Collins died on December 8, 1972, when United Airlines Flight 553 crashed on approach to Chicago Midway International Airport. Collins was a passenger on the flight. His wife Cardiss Collins was elected to his seat (which had been redistricted to the 7th district) shortly thereafter. Cardiss Collins was the first African American woman to represent a Midwestern district in Congress, and served in the House of Representatives from 1973 until her retirement in 1997, a tenure of over 23 years. In April 1976, The Chicago Public Schools opened Collins Academy High School, a public neighborhood high school in Chicago's Lawndale neighborhood in his honor.

== See also ==
- List of African-American United States representatives
- List of members of the United States Congress who died in office (1950–1999)

U.S. House of Representatives
Preceded by Daniel J. Ronan	U.S. Representative of Illinois's 6th congressional district 1970–1972	Succeeded by Harold R. Collier
