= Daniel J. Ronan =

American politician

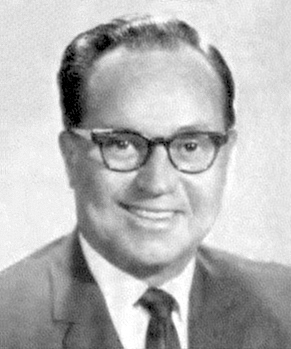

Member of the U.S. House of Representatives from Illinois's 6th district
- In office January 3, 1965 – August 13, 1969
- Preceded by: Thomas J. O'Brien
- Succeeded by: George W. Collins

Personal details
- Born: July 13, 1914 Chicago, Illinois
- Died: August 13, 1969 (aged 55) Chicago, Illinois
- Party: Democratic

Daniel John Ronan (July 13, 1914 – August 13, 1969) was a U.S. representative from Illinois.

Born in Chicago, Illinois, Ronan attended parochial schools. He graduated from St. Ignatius High School in 1933, from Loyola University Chicago in 1938, and took postgraduate work there from 1939 to 1941 and 1947 to 1948.

During World War II, Ronan served in U.S. Army Air Forces communications in the China Burma India Theater from 1942 to 1945. He served as member of the state house of representatives from 1948 to 1952, and was an alderman in Chicago from 1951 to 1964. Ronan was appointed acting ward committeeman in 1959, elected in 1960, and reelected in 1964; he served as member of the Chicago Planning Commission from 1959 to 1964.

Ronan was elected as a Democrat to the 89th, 90th, and 91st Congresses, and served the sixth district from January 3, 1965, until his death at age 55 in 1969. He suffered a fatal heart attack at his mother's house in Chicago on August 13, and was interred in Queen of Heaven Mausoleum in Hillside, west of Chicago.

Ronan's successor, George W. Collins, served only until December 1972, killed in the crash of United Airlines Flight 553 in Chicago.

== See also ==
- List of members of the United States Congress who died in office (1950–1999)

U.S. House of Representatives
Preceded by Vacant	Member of the U.S. House of Representatives from Illinois's 6th congressional district January 3, 1965 – August 13, 1969	Succeeded by Vacant
